= Vandalur (disambiguation) =

Vandalur is a census town and residential locality in Chennai, Tamil Nadu, India.

Vandalur may also refer to these related to the town:

- Vandalur taluk, a subdistrict of Chennai
- Vandalur railway station
- Vandalur Reserve Forest
- Vandalur Zoo
