= Arignar Anna Zoological Park =

Zoo in Chennai, India

Arignar Anna Zoological Park Vandalur Zoo
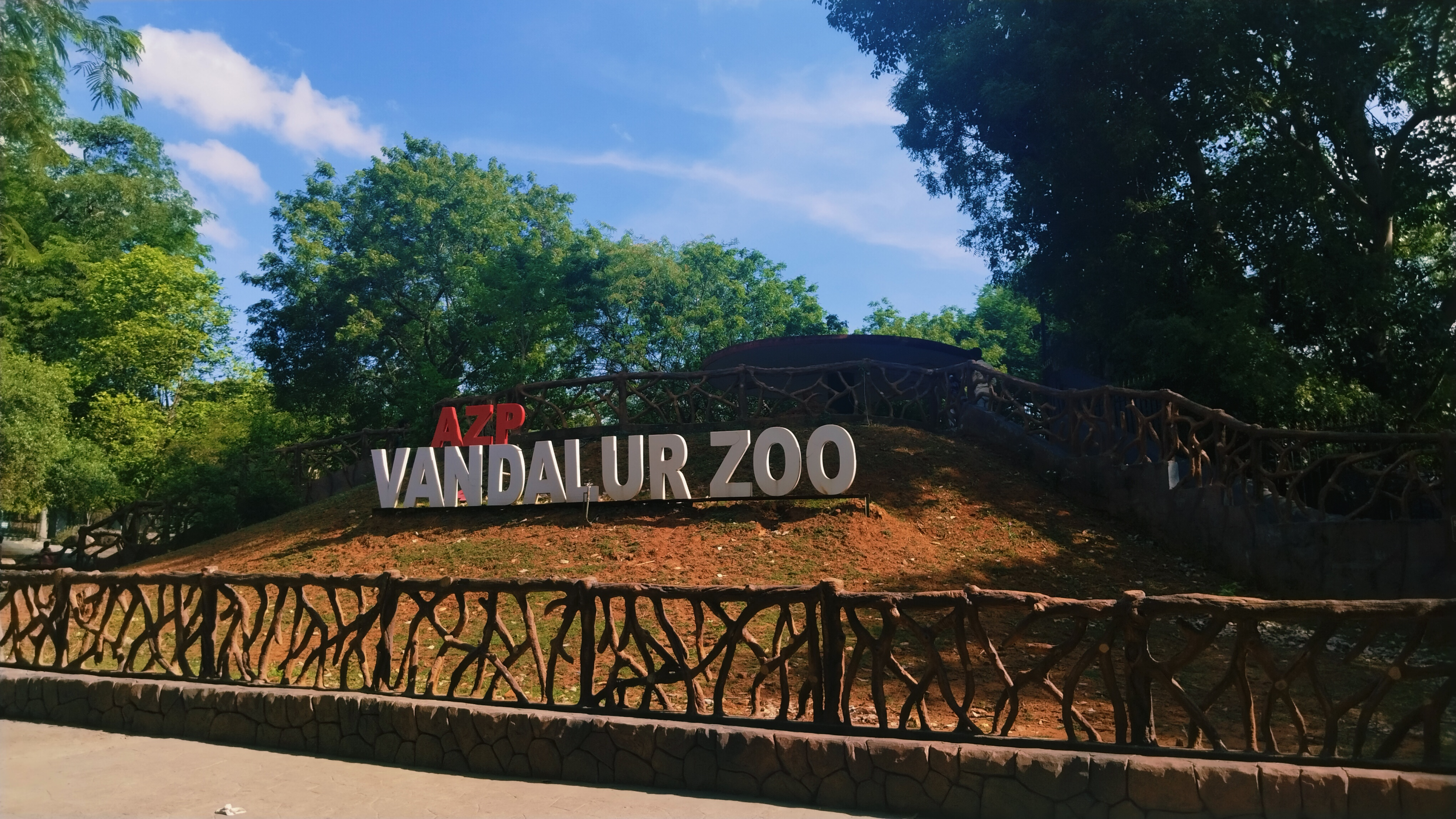
- Interactive map of Arignar Anna Zoological Park; Vandalur Zoo
- 12.87917°N 80.08167°E
- Date opened: 1855; 171 years ago (as Madras Zoo); 1985; 41 years ago (in current location)
- Location: Vandalur, Chennai, Tamil Nadu, India
- Land area: 602 ha (1,490 acres)
- No. of animals: 2,389 (2022)
- No. of species: 178 (2022)
- Annual visitors: 2.05 million (2018–19)
- Memberships: Central Zoo Authority; World Association of Zoos and Aquariums
- Website: www.aazp.in

Arignar Anna Zoological Park also known as the Vandalur Zoo, is a zoological garden in Chennai, India. It is located at Vandalur in the south western part of the city, about 32 km (20 mi) from the city center. It is spread over an area of 602 ha (1,490 acres) and is amongst the largest zoos in South Asia. The park is open for public viewing.

It was established by Edward Balfour in 1855 as Madras Zoo in the Madras Government Museum premises and was amongst the earliest zoos in the country. As the zoo expanded, it was shifted to People's Park in Park Town in 1863. For the want of space for expansion, the Government of Tamil Nadu intended to move the zoo to the Vandalur reserve forest in 1979. The zoo was opened to public on 24 July 1985, and is named after earlier chief minister Annadurai.

It is affiliated with the Central Zoo Authority of India, and is managed by the Tamil Nadu Zoo Authority. The park exhibits various animals that are segregated based on the taxonomic classification. The animals are usually displayed in open enclosures with concrete walls and moats separating them from viewing areas. As of 2022, the park housed 2,389 animals across 178 species. The park has a specialised display area for nocturnal animals, a serpentarium, an aquarium, an amphibian house, a pre-historic park, a butterfly park, a primate house, and a walk-through aviary. There is a wildlife safari which operates within the park.

The park run its own veterinary hospital, which is involved in disease screening, treatment and vaccination. The zoo runs various educational and outreach programmes. It also engages in research activities, aimed at conservation and understanding animal behaviour. The zoo serves as a captive breeding center and a coordinating zoo for the breeding programmes for endangered species as per the National Zoo Policy enacted by the government. There is a rescue and rehabilitation centre spread over an area of 92 ha (230 acres) which houses abandoned and rescued animals.

== History ==
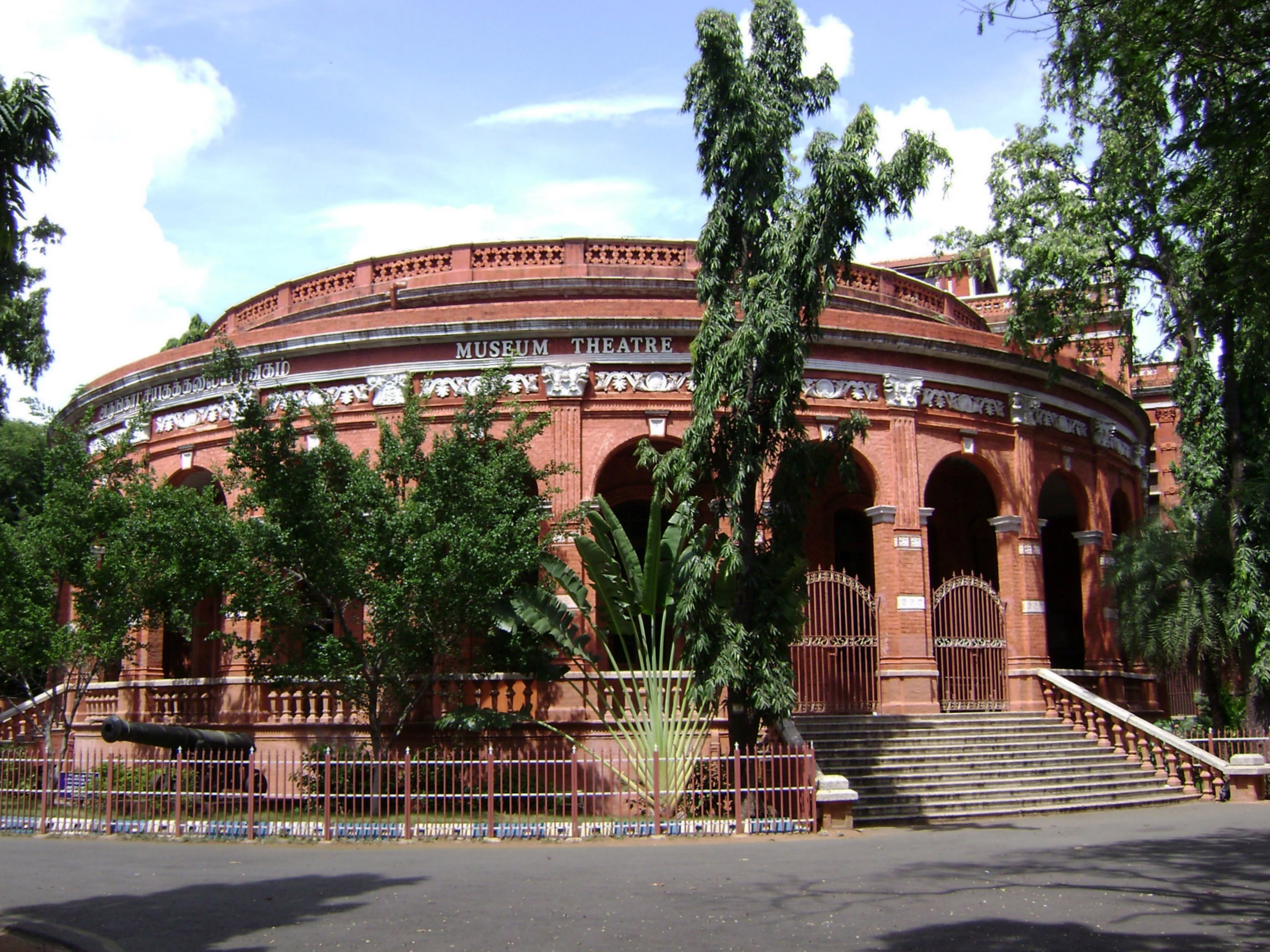
Government Museum

Edward Balfour established the Madras Government Museum in 1851. He established a menagerie in the natural history section of the museum with a live leopard and tiger. As the number of visitors to the museum increased during the live exhibition, Balfour started a small zoological park in the museum premises in 1855. He persuaded then Nawab of the Carnatic to donate his entire animal collection to the museum. This became the Madras zoo and was one of the first zoos to be established in the country. It housed a collection of nearly 300 species of animals and birds by the next year. As the zoo expanded, it was shifted to People's Park in Park Town in 1863. In 1876, the zoo was spread over an area of 116 acres (47 ha) and was open to the public for free viewing. The zoo exhibits included an orangutan, two-horned rhinoceros, Malayan tapir, and black headed gull.

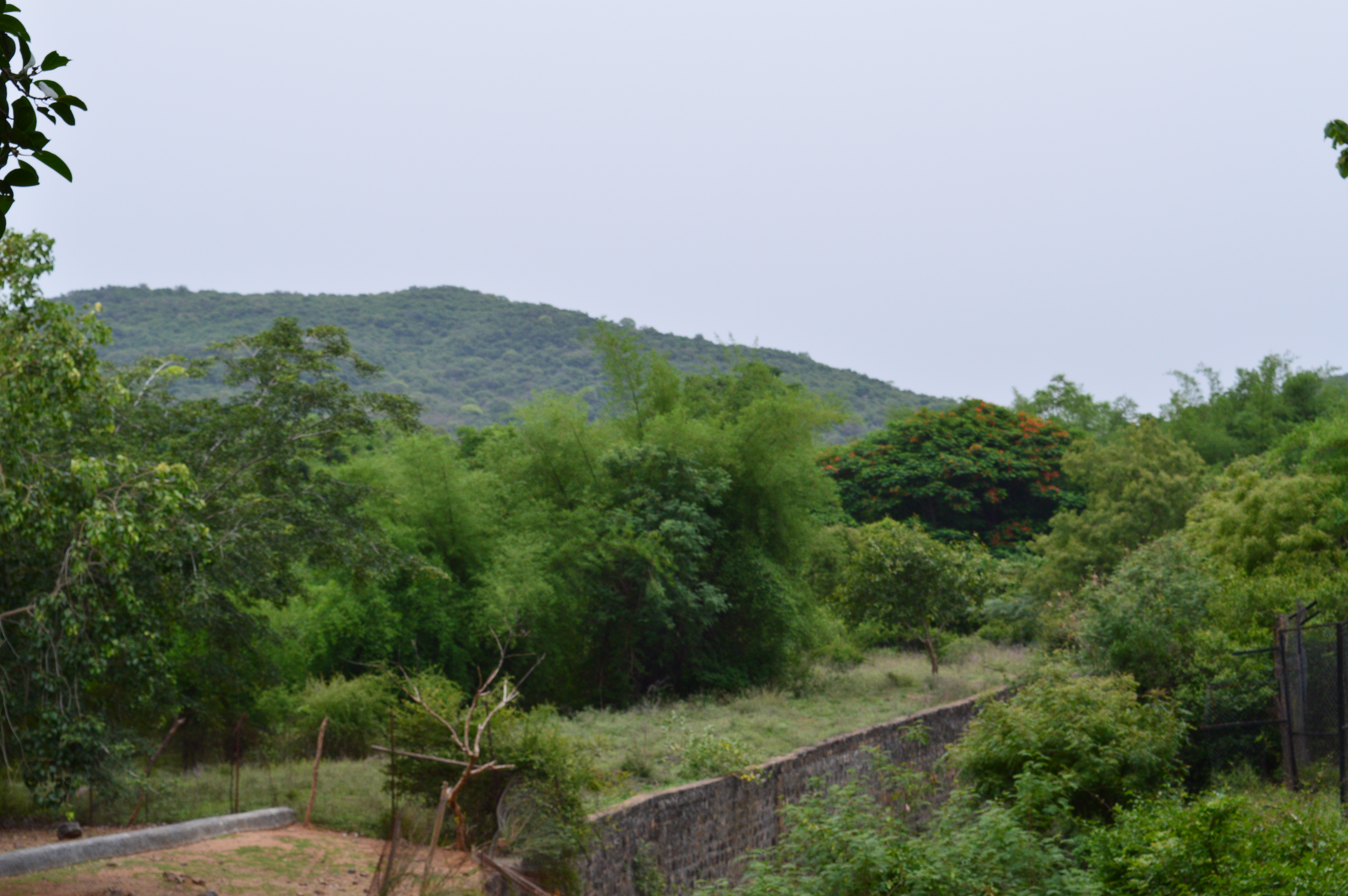
Vandalur reserve forest

By the late 1970s, the zoo was surrounded by the city and had limited space for expansion. In 1973, the Government of Tamil Nadu constituted a team to plan for the relocation of the zoo to a new location within the next five years. With the handing over of a part of the land occupied by the zoo to the Indian Railways for the expansion of Chennai Central, the zoo was planned to be shifted to Guindy temporarily in 1978. In 1979, the Tamil Nadu Forest Department set aside 1,100 acres (450 ha) in the Vandalur Reserve Forest on the outskirts of the city to build a new premises for the zoo. The state government planned for the construction of a new zoo at a cost of ₹30 million (equivalent to ₹770 million or US$8.0 million in 2023). The land consisting of shrubs and eucalyptus trees was re-planted.

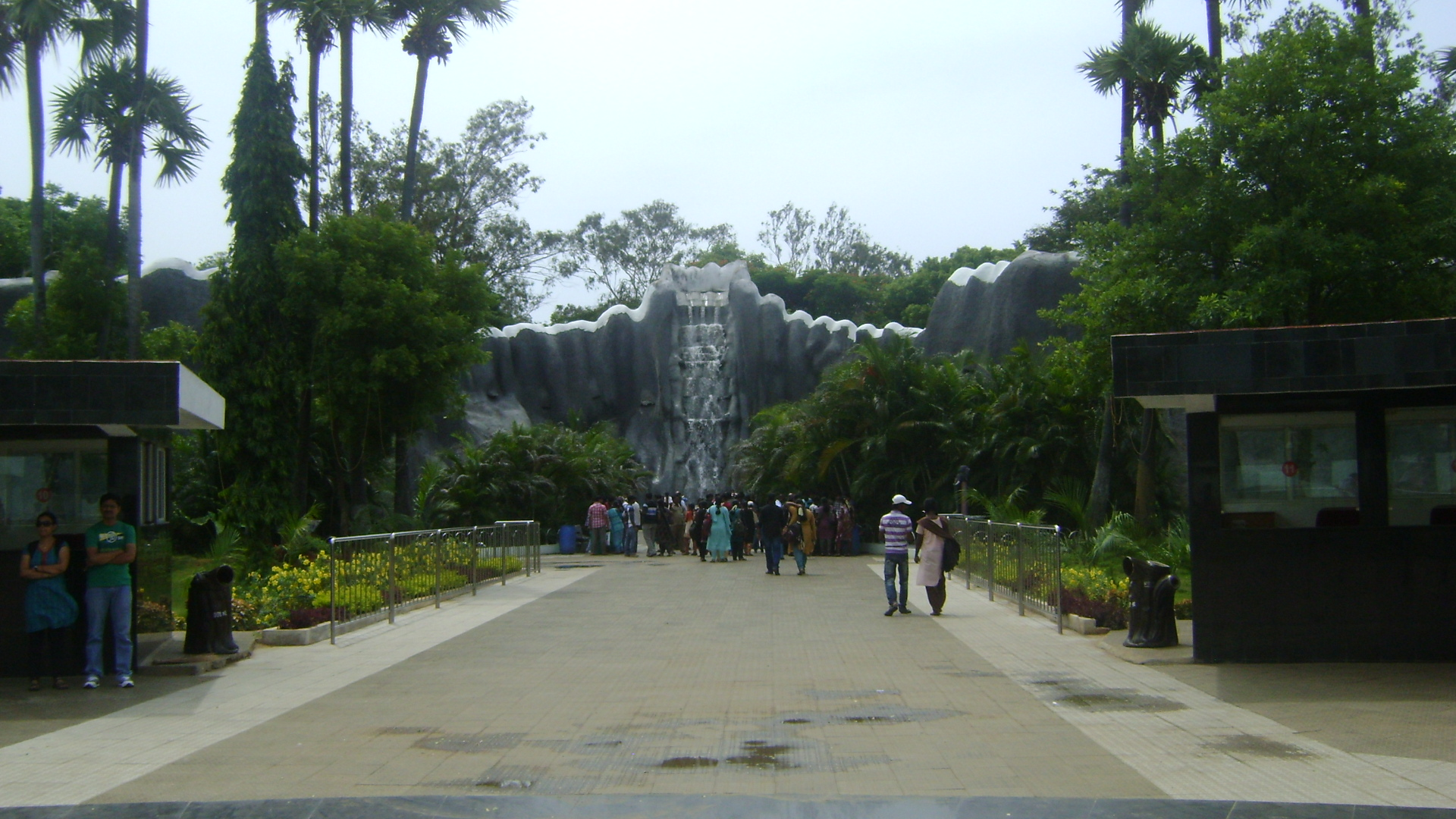
The entrance to the zoo after renovation in 2011

In 1980, the state government approved the layout for the zoo and issued additional order to expand the park to by 38.74 acres (15.68 ha). In 1981, designs were made for the animal enclosures, with the first enclosures completed in 1982. The first animals were moved to the new premises in the same year. The construction of footpaths, roads, staff quarters, and a veterinary hospital were completed in 1983. In 1984, water was diverted from the Palar to augment the water supply. The zoo was opened to public on 24 July 1985, and was named after earlier chief minister Annadurai. The park was expanded in 2000 by 92 ha (230 acres) to 510 ha (1,300 acres) with the addition of a rescue center and school. In 2011, the park underwent a major renovation costing ₹32.5 million (equivalent to ₹67 million or US$700,000 in 2023) with the expansion of animal enclosures. It also involved the addition of a new entrance, lawns, interactive displays, souvnier shop, ticketing and visitor centers. The Otteri lake in the premises was also cleaned, and improved. As of 2024, the park spans 602 ha (1,490 acres) and is amongst the largest zoos in South Asia.

== Organisation and objectives ==
The main objectives of the park are ex-situ conservation of endangered species, wildlife education, and research for wildlife conservation and management. The zoo aims to maintain a viable and healthy population of animals in naturalistic enclosures while facilitating public visitation. It is affiliated with the Central Zoo Authority, and is a member of World Association of Zoos and Aquariums.

The Tamil Nadu Zoo Authority was established with the chief minister as the chairperson in 2004 for the management of the zoo. The overall management of the zoo is headed by a director, who is assisted by deputy and assistant directors. The director is answerable to the governing board. The deputy director is responsible for infrastructure, animal breeding and exchange, training, and research. The assistant director oversees horticulture, electricity, water supply and public utilities, visitor facilities, and upkeep of animal enclosures. A team of five forest rangers are responsible for the maintenance and safety of various designated areas of the park. Three biologists are responsible for research and exchange, training, and record keeping. The zoo has a team of veterinarians, and animal keepers, apart from other administrative and support staff.

== Geography ==
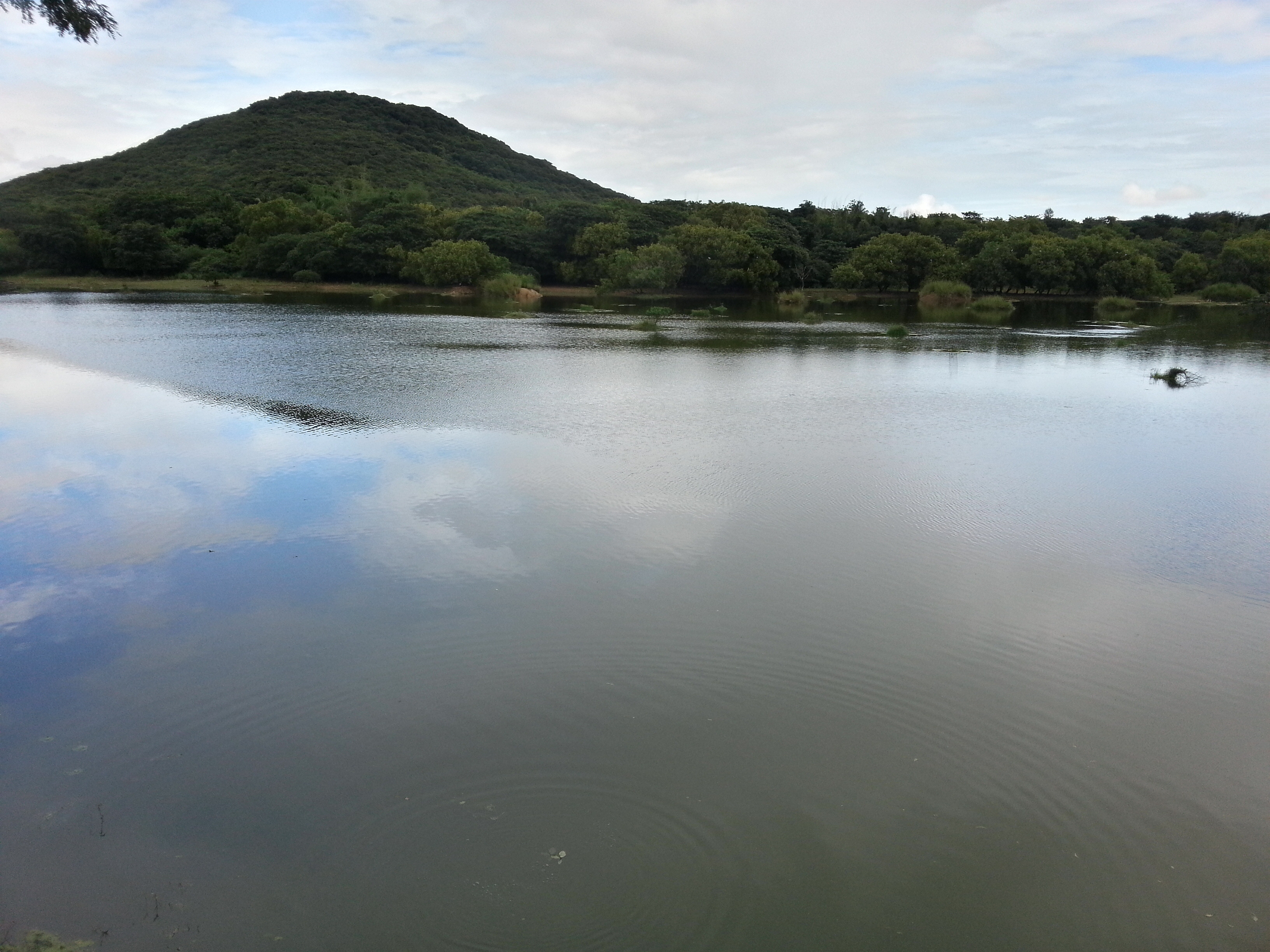
Otteri lake and hillock

The zoological park is located along the eastern side of the Grand Southern Trunk Road at Vandalur in the south-western part of the Chennai Metropolitan Area, about 32 km (20 mi) from the city center. It is spread across 602 ha (1,490 acres) of rocky terrain with alluvial soil. The park has a small hillock towards the center which gently slopes in an east–west direction. The altitude ranges between 31 and 147 m (102 and 482 ft) with an average elevation of 50 m (160 ft). The park experiences a tropical climate with average temperatures on 26 °C (79 °F) and high humidity due to its location close to the coast. The summers are hot and humid with the highest temperatures recorded in May–June with an average maximum of 36.10 °C (96.98 °F). The temperatures are lowest in December with an average minimum of 21.68 °C (71.02 °F). The park receives most of its rainfall from the northeast monsoon during October–November. The average annual rainfall is about 140 cm (55 in).

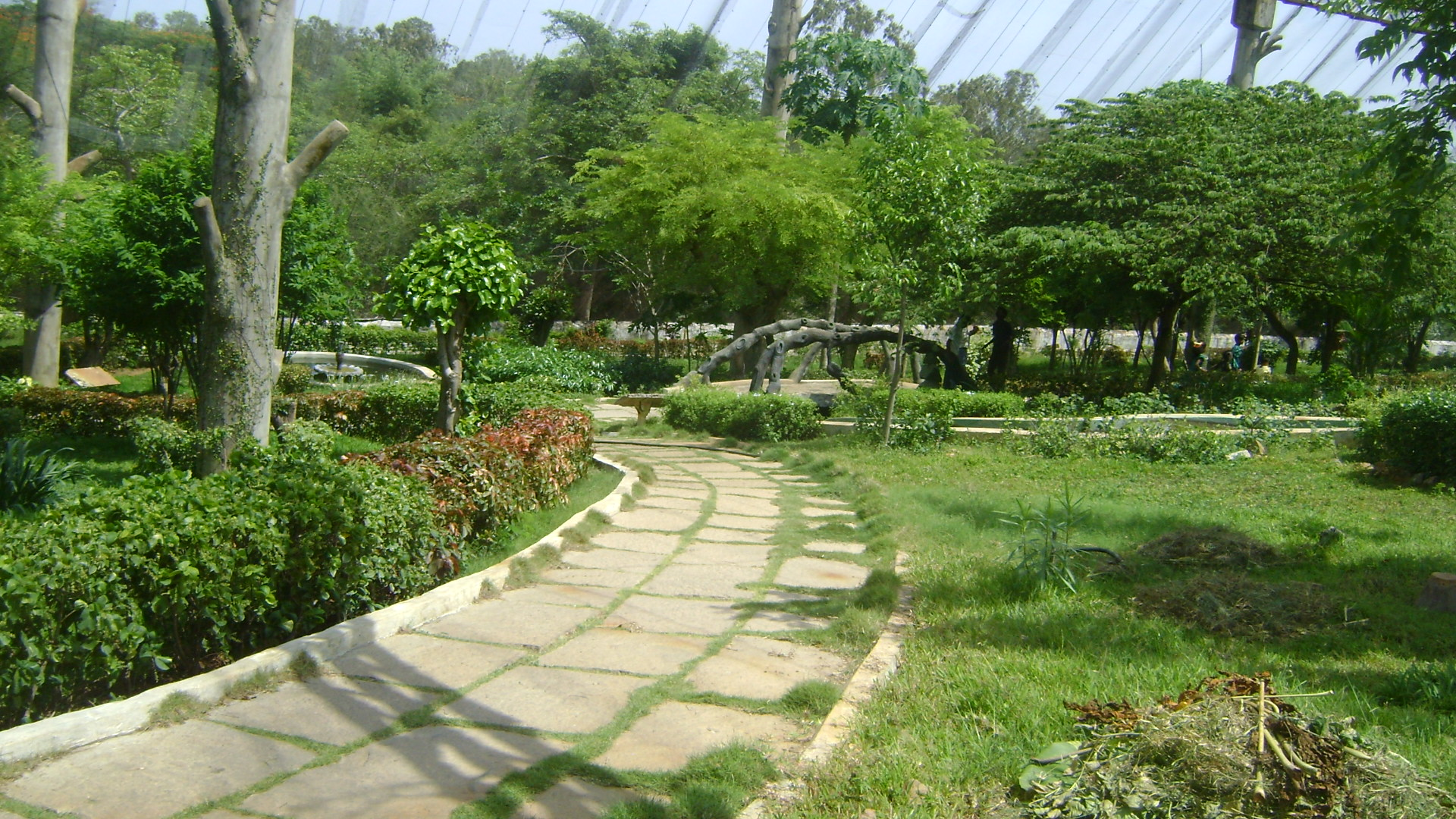
Planted vegetation

The park is located within the Vandalur reserve forest. The original landscape consisted of sparse scrub forests consisting of Carissa, Gmelina, Eugenia, Acacia, and Intsia with intermittent dry evergreen vegetation. The vegetation included a few cashew and eucalyptus trees. Much of the original vegetation was preserved apart from necessary deforestation for the construction of various facilities and roads. The original vegetation was augmented by newly planted dry evergreen trees. About 138 plant species have been recorded in the park. The park experiences a micro climate, different from the surrounding areas due to its dense vegetation. The Otteri lake is situated on the north-western side within the park and acts as a roosting ground for aquatic migratory birds. The lake attracts more than 10,000 migratory birds every year. The lake consists of planted Barringtonia trees, which serve as roost for the birds.

== Layout and exhibits ==
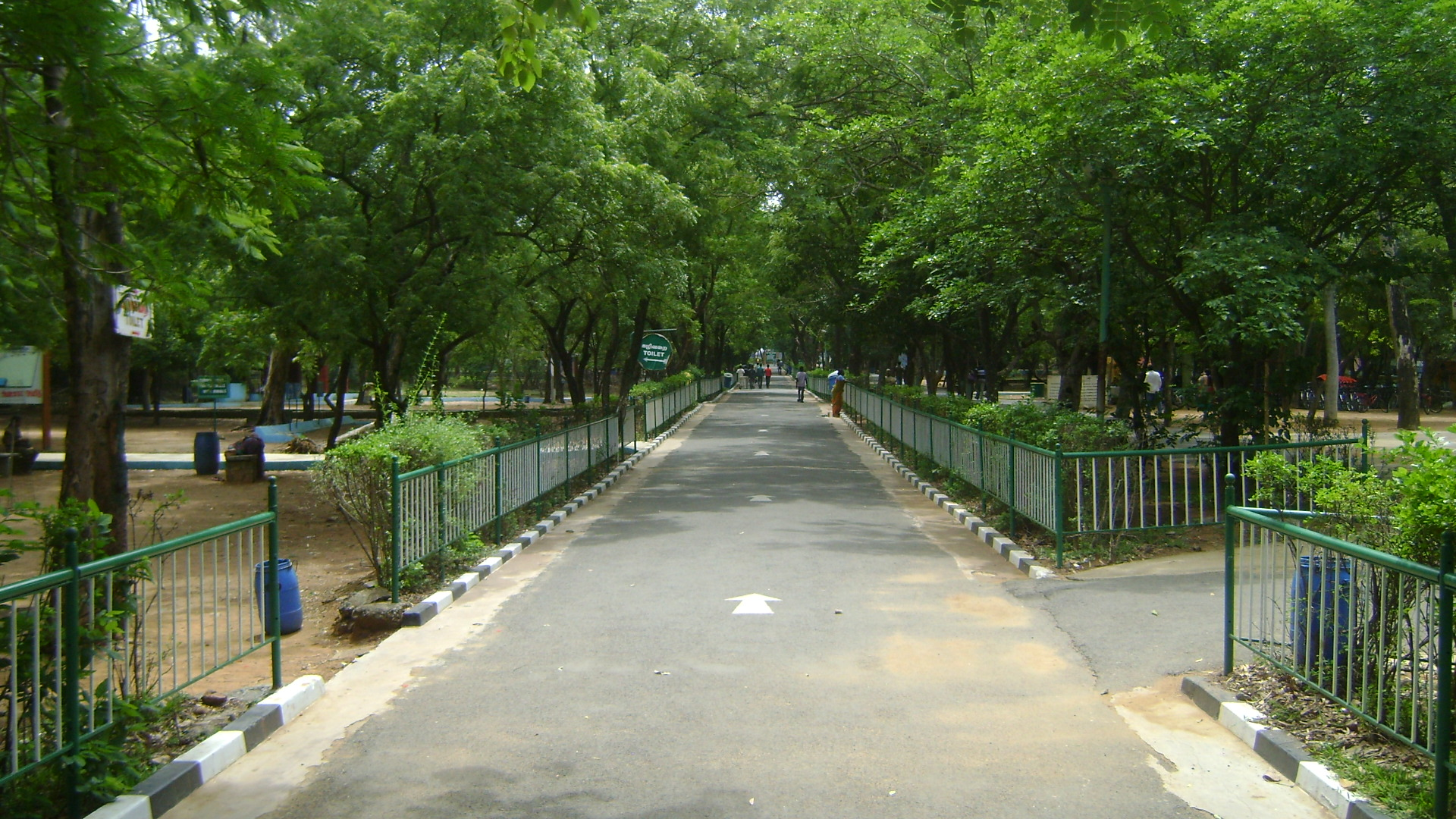
Typical walkways with open enclosures on the sides

The main entrance of the park is located towards the south west along the Grand Southern Trunk Road. The entire campus is enclosed by a compound wall. Close to the entrance, there is a children's park on one side and lawns on the other side. The enclosure of water fowl is located close to the children's park next to the primate section, followed by the terrestrial birds. A circular pathway takes the visitors to the interior of the park around the hillock. The enclosures for the carnivores are situated on the top of the hill with the herbivore exhibits along the slopes. Lower down the road are two smaller loop sections with one consisting of the bear enclosures and the other accommodating the walk-through aviary. The bear section leads to the lion safari at the north east corner of the zoo.

Back on the main circular road, the reptile section is situated next to the road leading to the pre-historic animal park. It is followed by the enclosures for large mammals such as elephants, hippopotamus, and rhinoceros. The nocturnal animal enclosure is situated further down the road, followed by enclosures for ostrich, giraffe, zebra, and kangaroo. The circular road ends at the aquarium which leads the towards the exit. Recreational facilities for the visitors are spread across the park. The kitchen, animal quarantine and breeding facilities, veterinary hospital and stores are situated away from the visitor areas on the southern side of the park.

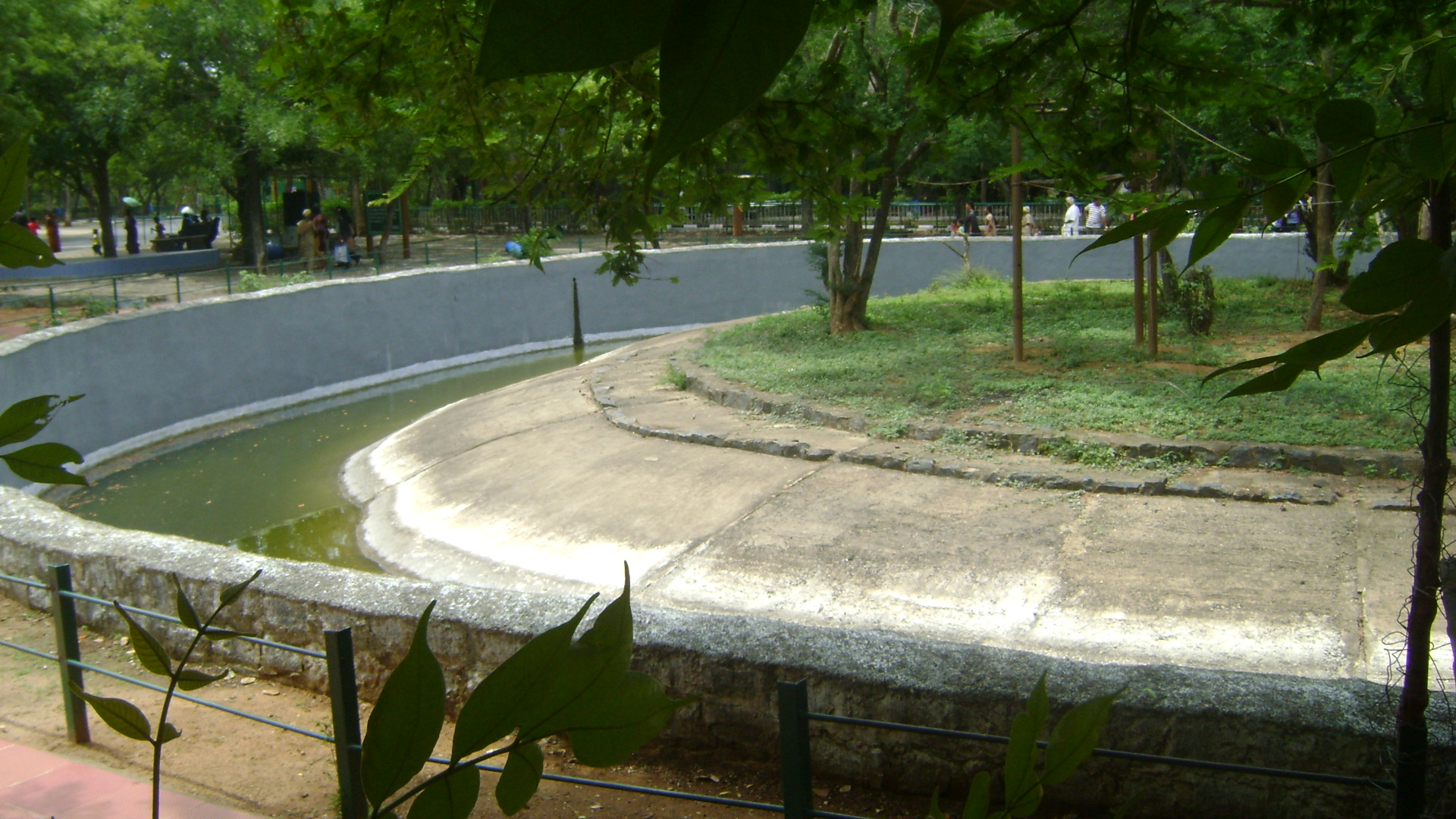
A typical moated enclosure

The animals are segregated and placed based on the taxonomic classification and geographic distribution except for specialized requirements such as water dwellers and nocturnal species. The enclosure dimensions and designs are customised basis the requirement of various species. The enclosures consist of various vegetation as favored by the species exhibited. Separate feeding areas and night shelters have been constructed along the enclosures. The animal viewing areas are open with concrete walls and moats separating them from the animal enclosures. The various animal enclosures also separated by adequate space and vegetation. Vegetation is also used to camouflage concrete structures for aesthetic appeal. As of 2022, the park housed 2,389 animals across 178 species.

Animal stock
Class	Species	Count
Mammalia	45	504
Birds	94	1,473
Reptiles	39	412
Total	178	2,389

List of animals

Mammals

- Asian elephant
- Asiatic lion
- Asian palm civet
- Barasingha
- Bengal tiger
- Barking deer
- Blackbuck
- Black giant squirrel
- Bonnet macaque
- Chimpanzee
- Chital
- Dhole
- Eurasian otter
- Gaur
- Giraffe
- Grant's zebra
- Gray slender loris
- Golden jackal
- Hanuman langur
- Himalayan black bear
- Hippopotamus
- Indian crested porcupine
- Indian fox
- Indian giant flying squirrel
- Indian giant squirrel
- Indian grey mongoose
- Indian hare
- Indian hog deer
- Indian leopard
- Indian muntjac
- Indian rhinoceros
- Indian wild ass
- Indian wolf
- Jaguar
- Jungle cat
- Lion-tailed macaque
- Mouse deer
- Nilgai
- Nilgiri langur
- Red-handed tamarin
- Rhesus macaque
- Sambar deer
- Sloth bear
- Small Indian civet
- Striped hyena
- Tufted capuchin
- Tufted gray langur
- Wild boar
- Yellow baboon

Birds

- Adjutant stork
- African grey parrot
- Bar headed goose
- Barn owl
- Black kite
- Black swan
- Black-headed gull
- Black-headed munia
- Blossom-headed parakeet
- Blue-and-yellow macaw
- Blue rock pigeon
- Brahminy kite
- Budgerigar
- Cassowary
- Cattle egret
- Cockatiel
- Common myna
- Crested serpent eagle
- Demoiselle crane
- Diamond dove
- Dusky parrot
- Eastern rosella
- Eastern white stork
- Eclectus parrot
- Fischer's lovebird
- Forest owlet
- Glossy ibis
- Golden pheasant
- Great white pelican
- Greater coucal
- Greater flamingo
- Green cheek conure
- Grey cockatiel
- Grey heron
- Grey partridge
- Grey pelican
- Greylag goose
- Harlequin macaw
- Indian eagle owl
- Indian peafowl
- Indian vulture
- Java sparrow
- Jenday conure
- Koel
- Lady Amherst's pheasant
- Lesser whistling duck
- Little cormorant
- Little egret
- Maroon-bellied parakeet
- Moluccan cockatoo
- Monk parakeet
- Night heron
- Openbill stork
- Orange-winged amazon
- Oriental darter
- Ostrich
- Paddyfield pipit
- Painted stork
- Palm cockatoo
- Parakeet
- Peach-faced lovebird
- Pearly conure
- Pond heron
- Rainbow lorikeet
- Red jungle fowl
- Red-collared dove
- Red-bellied macaw
- Red-vented bulbul
- Red-whiskered bulbul
- Rhea
- Rock dove
- Rose-ringed parakeet
- Rüppell's parrot
- Sarus crane
- Scarlet macaw
- Severe macaw
- Shikra
- Silver pheasant
- Spot-billed duck
- Spotted dove
- Sulphur-crested cockatoo
- Sun conure
- White cockatoo
- White ibis
- White spoonbill
- White-rumped vulture
- White-bellied sea eagle
- White-browed bulbul
- White-browed wagtail
- White-eyed conure
- Yellow-billed babbler
- Zebra finch

Reptiles

- Anaconda
- Asian water monitor
- Assam roofed turtle
- Ball python
- Beauty snake
- Bengal monitor
- Black pond turtle
- Checkered keelback
- Common bronzeback
- Common krait
- Dwarf crocodile
- Gharial
- Green iguana
- Indian black turtle
- Indian chameleon
- Indian cobra
- Indian flapshell turtle
- Indian python
- Indian star tortoise
- Indian star tortoise
- King cobra
- Morelet's crocodile
- Mugger crocodile
- Nile crocodile
- Rat snake
- Red eared terrapin
- Red sand boa
- Reticulated python
- Russell's viper
- Saltwater crocodile
- Sand boa
- Saw scaled viper
- Siamese crocodile
- Spectacled caiman
- Sri Lankan green vine snake
- Tricarinate hill turtle
- West African dwarf crocodile
- Whitaker's boa

=== Mammals ===
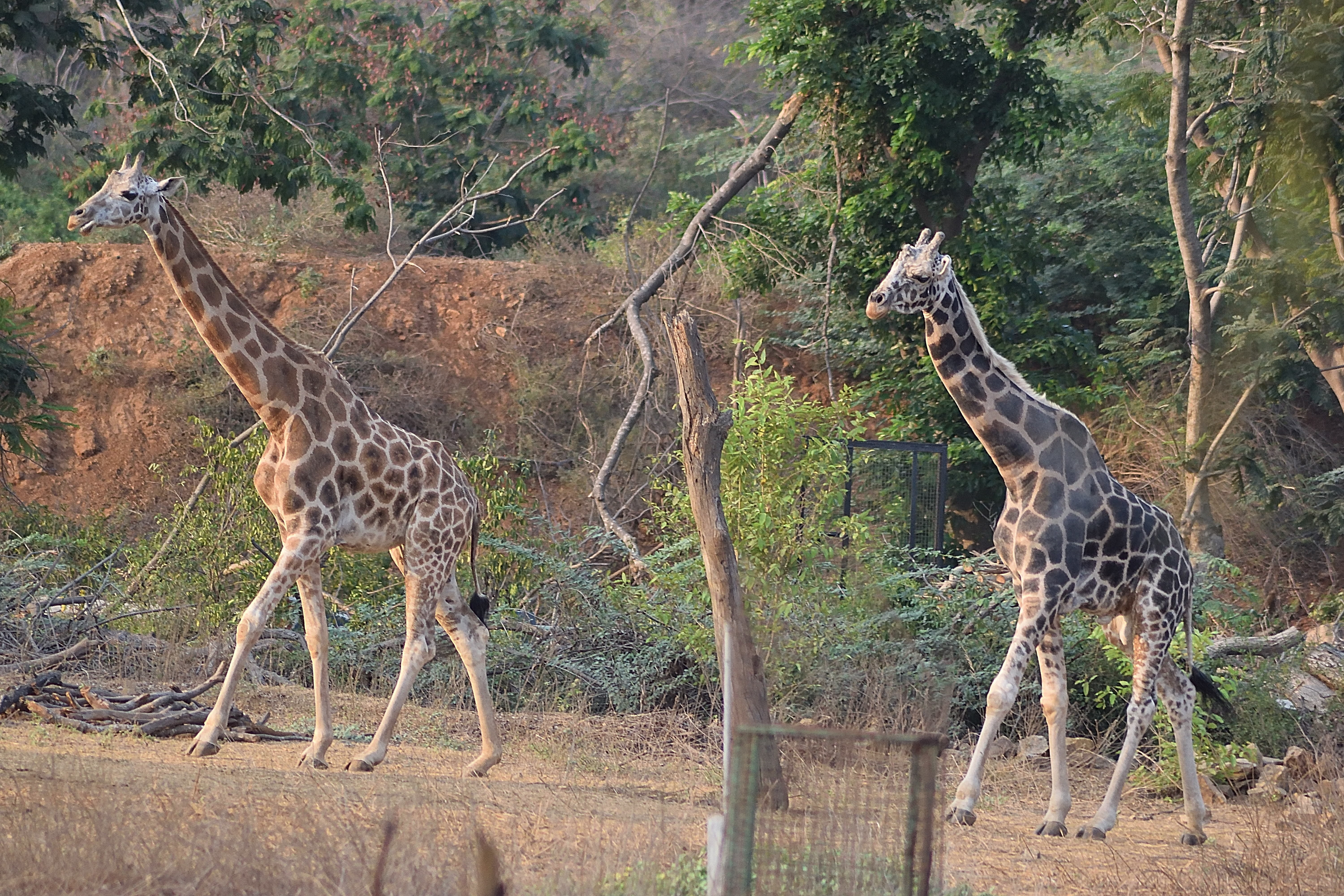
Giraffe in open enclosures

The ungulate herbivore animals are enclosed in open paddocks with suitable tree species, equipped with separate feeding areas. Other mammals such as tiger, lion, bear, leopard, jaguar, fox, jackal, hyena, wild dog, and wild ass are housed in appropriate enclosures with open yards. The elephants are enclosed in large open space covering 25 ha (62 acres). Hippopotamus are housed in enclosures with open pools. Other large animals such as rhinoceros, giraffe, and zebra, are displayed in open enclosures separated by moats. Plans for night viewing of specific animals in the park was mooted in 2007. It was planned to be implemented by 2011 at a cost of ₹40.2 million (equivalent to ₹90 million or US$940,000 in 2023). The zoo authorities completed the construction of appropriate enclosures for these animals and planted saplings around the night safari area. After multiple delays, the plan was scrapped by the state government in 2011.

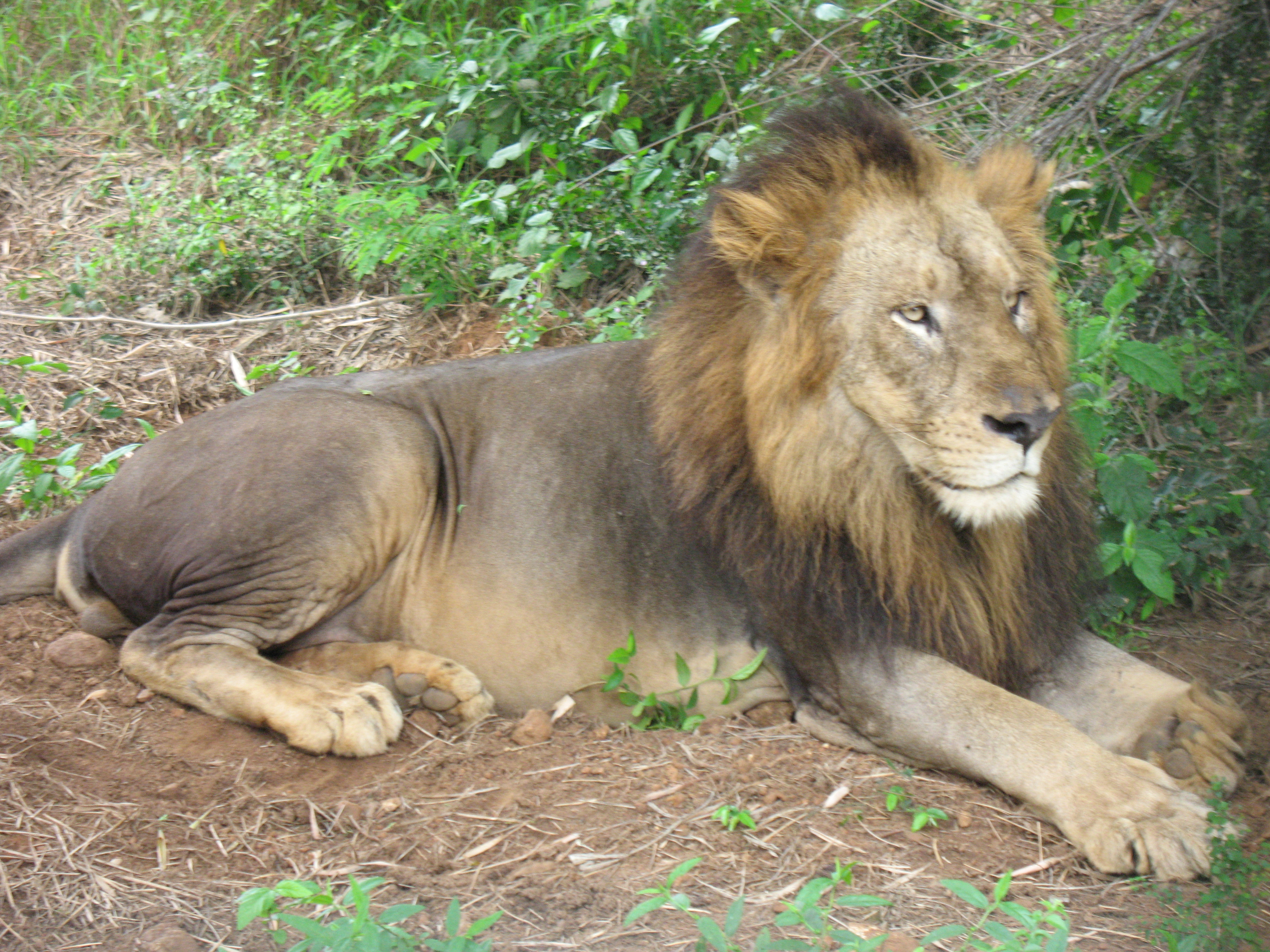
Asiatic lion in safari park

As part of the park's development plan, safari parks were established for lion and deer inside the park. The lion safari is spread over an area of 20 ha (49 acres) of scrub forests. The entire safari area consists of 147 acres (59 ha), which encloses a deer park consisting of species such as sambar deer, and spotted deer. The park authorities planned to create a safari for animals such as gaur and bear. The proposed safari was to be created on the 18 ha (44 acres) of the hilly terrain within lion safari area. The plans were not implemented due to the low population of these species in the zoo.

The primate house houses various primates such as Nilgiri langur, lion-tailed macaque, chimpanzee, savanna baboon, tufted capuchin, and red-handed tamarin. It consists of artificial perches, and swings to support the primates. The nocturnal animals section houses seven species including slender loris, porcupine, civet, and owls. It is modeled based on a cave ecosystem with glass enclosures, and was renovated in 2024 with better ventilation and light control. The pre-historic animal park consists of life size models of dinosaurs.

=== Birds ===
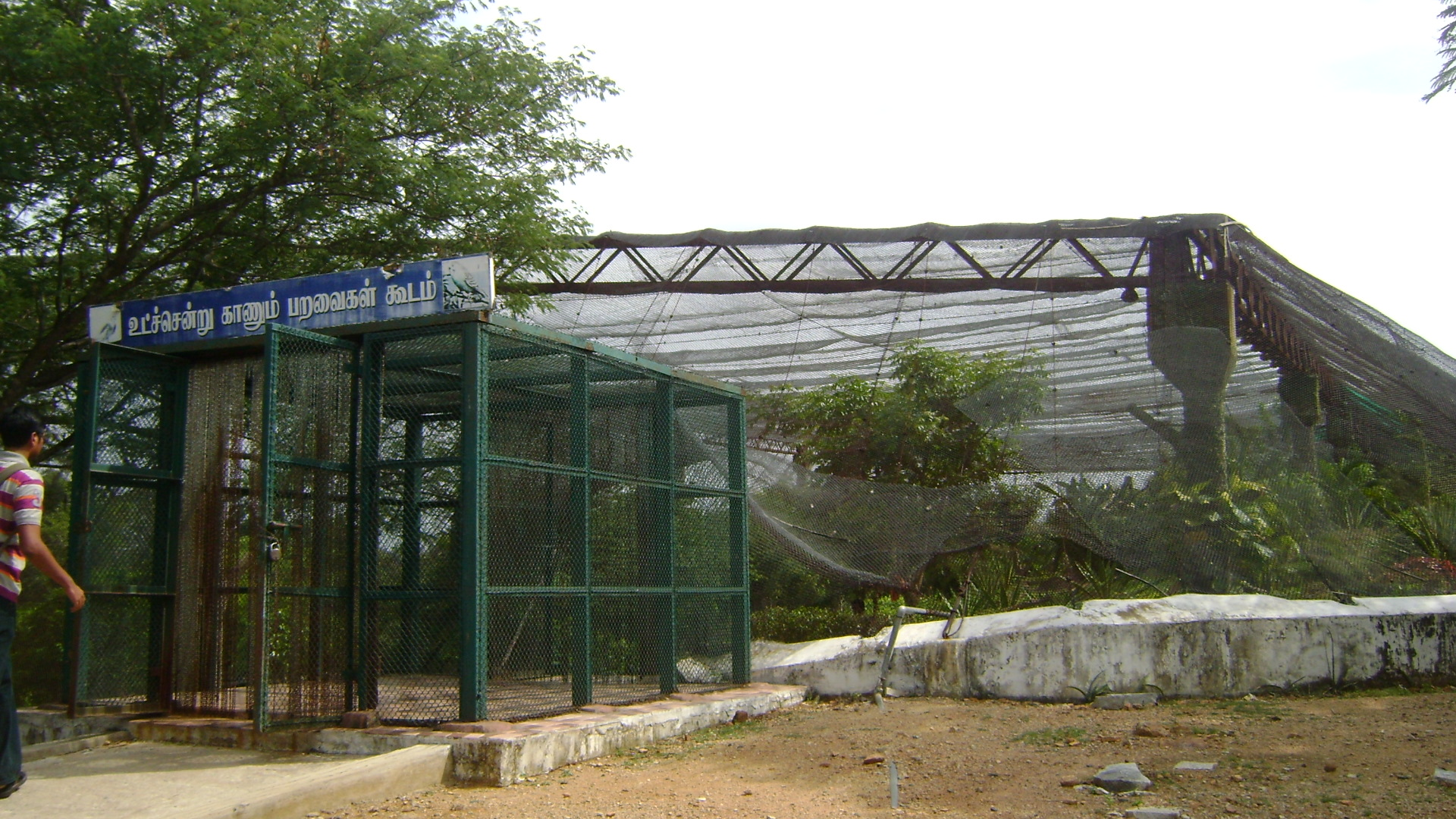
Walk-through aviary

Water fowl such as black swan is enclosed in open water pools. The bird section is sub divided into two based on geography: Indian and exotic. The Indian section consists of galliformes such as peafowl, jungle fowl, spurfowl, partridge, and psittaciformes such as parakeet. Typical bird enclosures have about 1 m (3 ft 3 in) soil depth for vegetation with appropriate resting and nesting areas. The walk-through aviary was renovated and opened in 2010. The free flight aviary covers an area of 1.5 acres (0.61 ha) and was built at a cost of ₹2 million (equivalent to ₹4.5 million or US$47,000 in 2023). The enclosure is covered by 15 m (49 ft) tall large steel nets which give access to sunlight. It consists of lawns, fruit bearing trees, mud baths, and fountains. Trees with holes and heaps of stones have been provided for nesting. The aviary is amongst the biggest such facility in a zoo in the country. Aquatic birds such as ducks, cranes, storks, pelicans, ibis, herons, and hornbills are enclosed in large covered aviaries with flowing water and sparse vegetation cover. In 2024, the wetland birds enclosure was upgraded with a chain-link mesh enclosing a 18 m (59 ft) high dome, with wooden platforms for birds. The exotic enclosure consists of pheasants, cockatoos, macaws, and rosellas. Flightless birds such as emu, cassowary, and ostrich are housed in open enclosures.

=== Reptiles ===
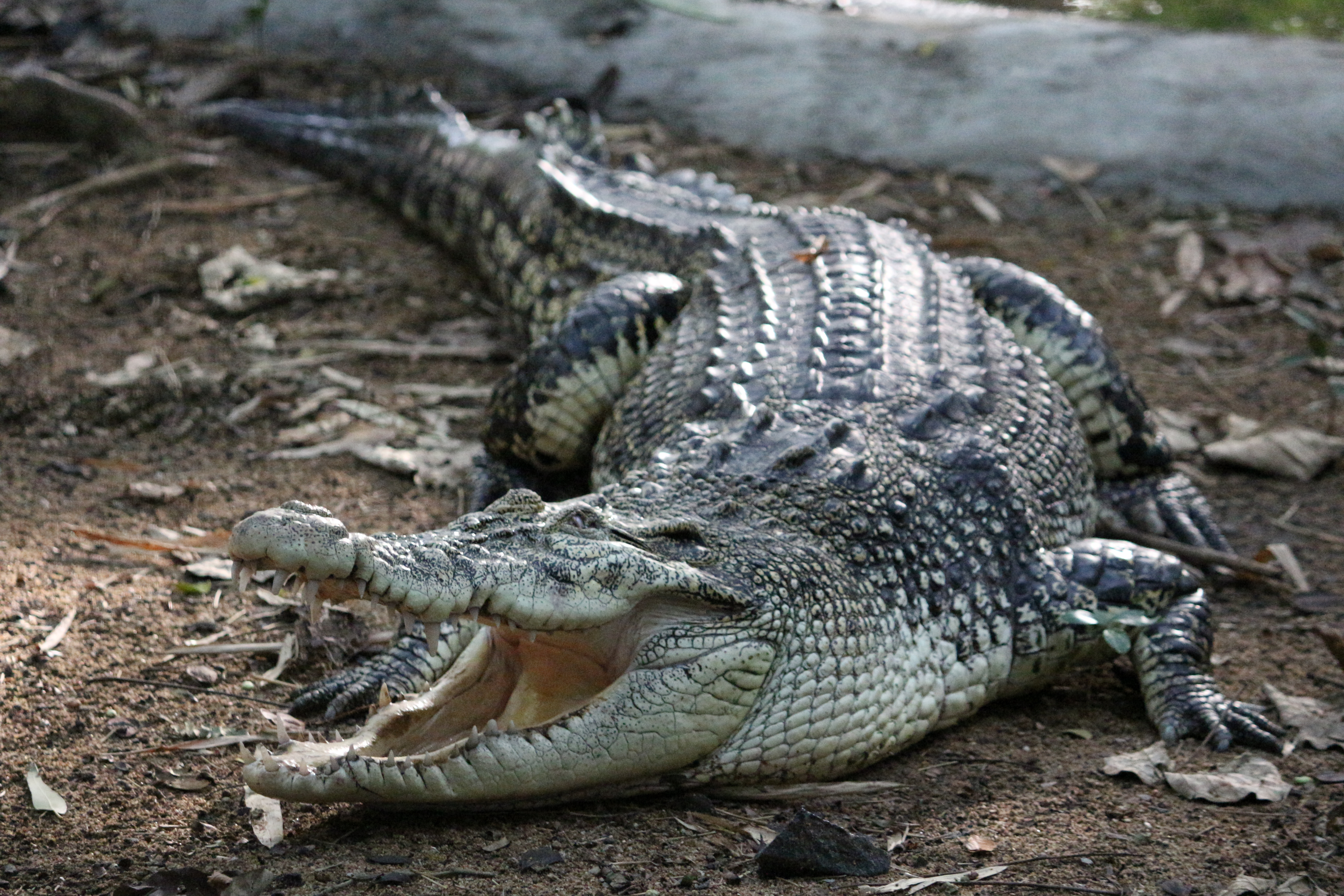
A crocodile at the zoo

The reptile house consists of reptiles such as tortoises, turtles, monitor lizards, iguanas, and separate facilities for crocodiles, and snakes. The serpentarium built at a cost of ₹0.4 million (US$4,200) in 2012 exhibits snakes in enclosures with fiber glass facades. The serpentarium exhibits various poisonous and non-poisonous snakes such as cobra, viper, sand boa, python, and anaconda. The crocodile enclosure houses various species in enclosures with pools. These include gharial, mugger crocodile, saltwater crocodile, and spectacled caiman. Some of the animals have been donated by the Madras Crocodile Bank.

=== Amphibians ===
The park was the first in the country to have a captive display of amphibians. The amphibian house consists of eight glass fronted tanks and exhibits various species of frogs and toads such as Indian tree frog, common Indian toad, Indian bullfrog, Indian cricket frog, and Indian pond frog.

=== Fishes and invertebrates ===
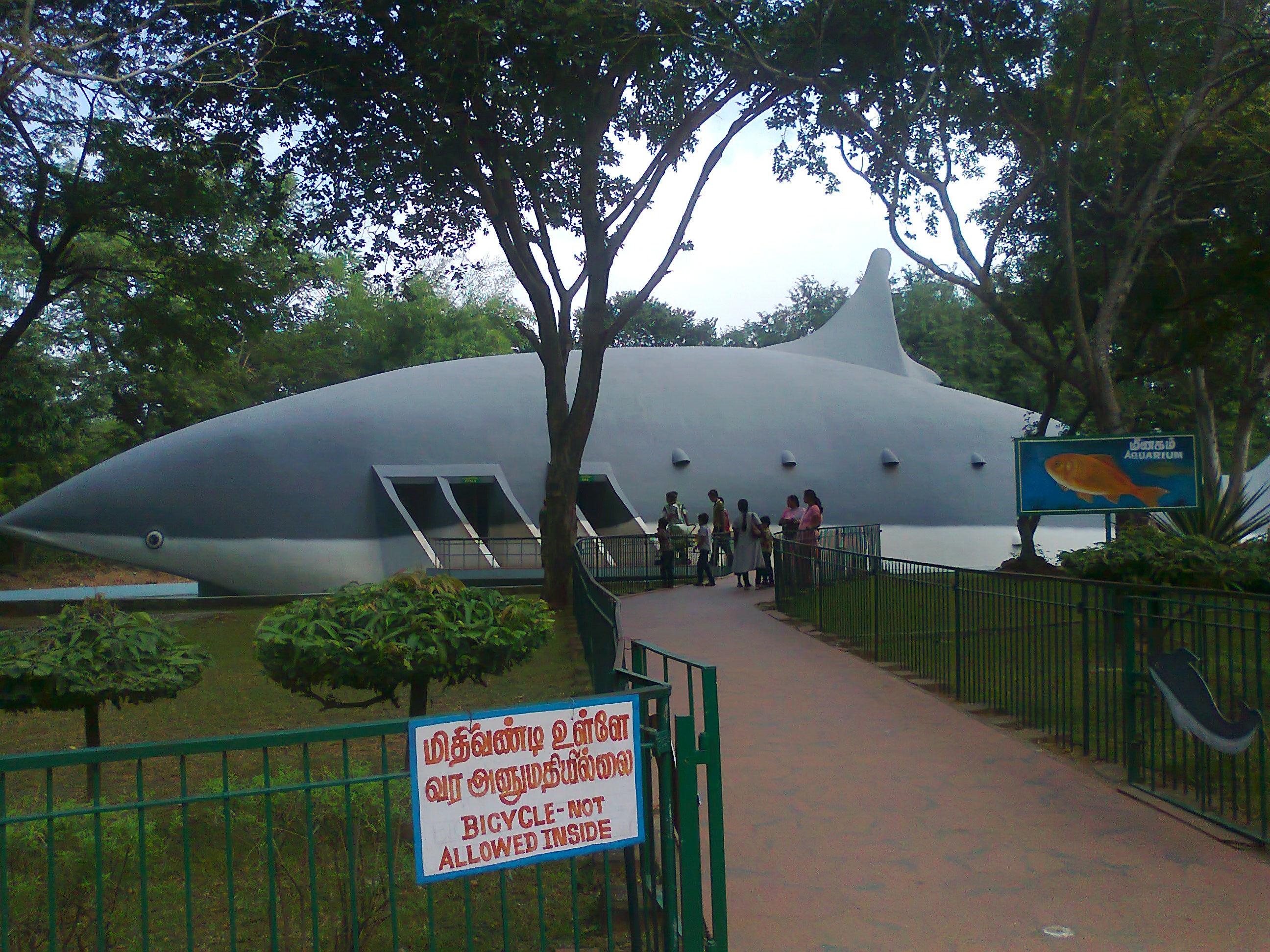
Aquarium

The aquarium is modeled in the shape of an open mouthed shark. It exhibits 31 species of fresh water fishes and aquatic creatures. The Otteri lake within the premises of the park also hosts various fishes.

The butterfly park and insect museum spans 2.7 ha (6.7 acres) along the western side near the Otteri lake, and was constructed at a cost of ₹50 million (equivalent to ₹85 million or US$880,000 in 2023). It was designed by the Tamil Nadu Agricultural University. It is shaped in the form of a caterpillar stretching 60 m (200 ft) in length and 26 m (85 ft) in width, enclosing various species of plants to support the insects. It has a 6 m (20 ft) high roof made of transparent poly-carbonate sheets for natural lighting, and is enclosed in a stainless steel mess. The park displays more than 80 species of butterflies including common Mormon, crimson rose, mottled emigrant, blue tiger, evening brown and lime butterfly. Apart from the exhibit, about 45 species of free ranging butterflies have been recorded in the park.

== Captive breeding ==
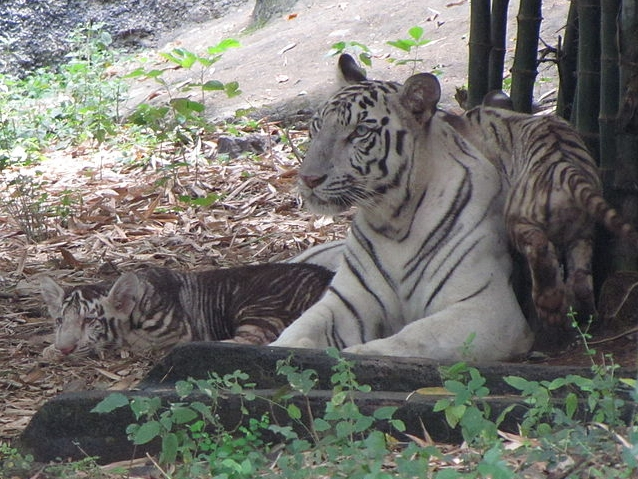
A White tiger with its cubs.

The Central Zoo Authority has designated the park as a captive breeding center for various species, and a coordinating zoo for the breeding programmes for endangered species as per the National Zoo Policy enacted by the government. The park also undertakes cross-breeding as part of its conservation efforts. Selected individuals born in captivity are released in the wild after adequate training. Separate breeding enclosures are maintained for select species with appropriate food and habitat to promote breeding. The park has successfully bred various species including ostrich, Asian palm civet, gaur, dhole, Asiatic lion, Nilgiri langur, lion-tailed macaque, hippopotamus, Bengal tiger, and leopard. The park is also involved in breeding various species of reptiles such as crocodiles, and pythons.

== Animal care ==
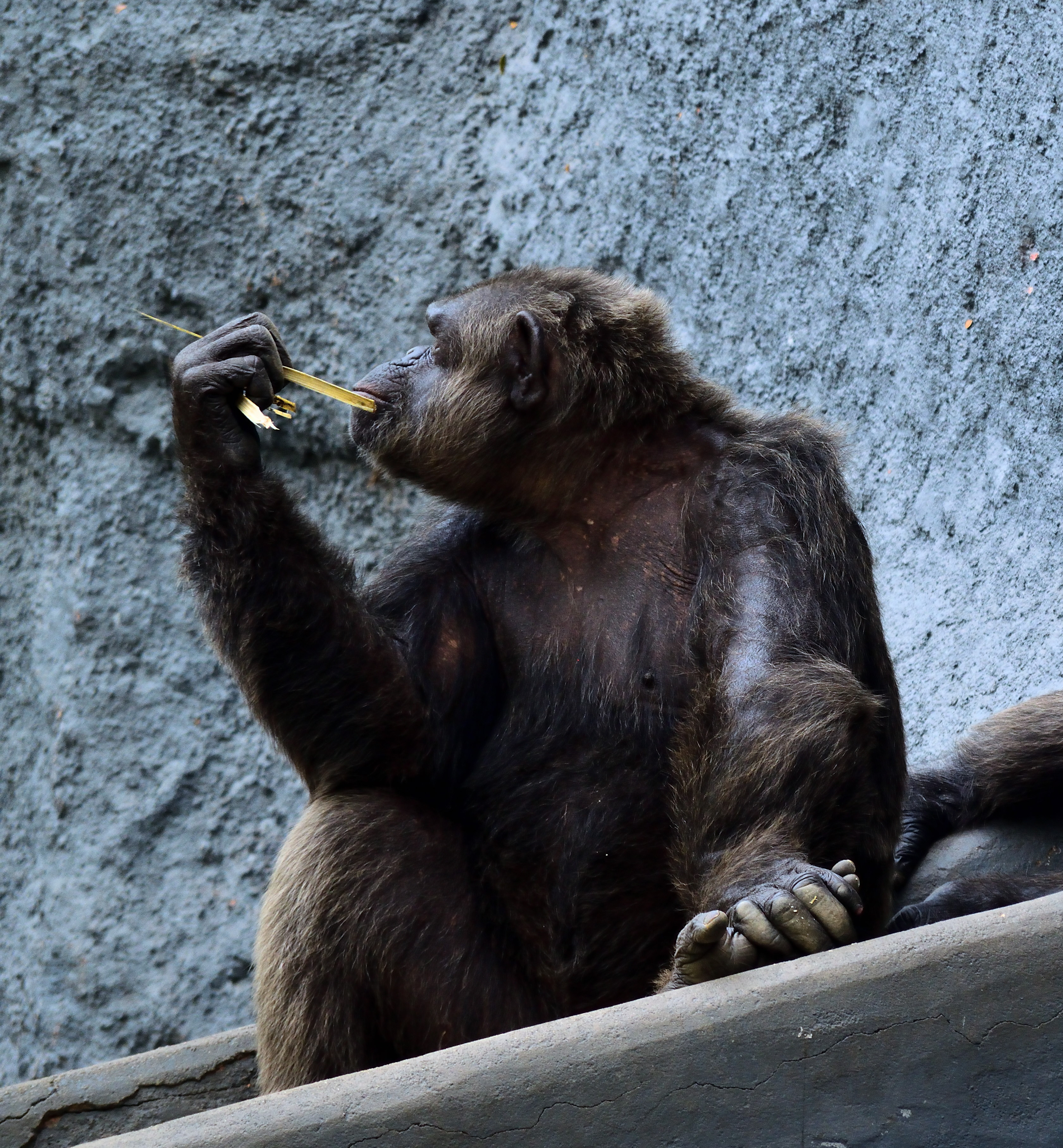
A feeding gorilla

The animal enclosures are designed as per the requirements of the animals housed. It includes isolated withdrawal areas, and artificial elements such as nests, perches, swings amongst others. The vegetation in the enclosures are maintained appropriately and the animal housing facilities are sanitised periodically with disinfectants to reduce chances of infections. The zoo maintains a veterinary hospital at the south eastern corner of the premises, staffed by three veterinarians. The hospital has a surgical facility, diagnostic laboratory, radiology unit, and a physiotherapy ward. There are in-patient recovery and isolation wards attached to the hospital. The hospital stocks various medicines for animal care, and other essentials such as anti venom for human emergencies. The hospital is also involved in screening of animals, and zookeepers for diseases, and vaccination. In July 2013, an ambulance facility was established for transporting animals. The zoo personnel are subject to various training activities to take care of animal handling. In March 2013, a blood transfusion performed on a 10-year-old hyena marked the first successful blood transfusion done for a wild species in an Indian zoo.

Animals are provided food as prescribed by the Indian Veterinary Research Institute. They are fed in specifically designed feeding areas, and kraals. Animals such as bears are provided with hidden feed points to encourage exploration and foraging. The feeding is done with limited human contact, and the areas are often hidden from visitor areas. The stores and kitchen are located away from the visitor areas. As incidents of infighting amongst animals have been reported, isolation facilities are provided for certain species in case of infighting or diseases. As the zoo experiences higher temperatures during summer, the zoo maintains elaborate vegetation to provide relief to the animals. The animal enclosures are provided with thatched roofs covered with leaves and wet bags, river sand on the floor, and water sprinklers for cooling. Food such as porridge, buttermilk, succulent plants, and fruits are served to the animals. Certain enclosures are air conditioned for temperature regulation. During rainy, and winter seasons, appropriate shelters and bedding are provided for shielding from rain and cold.

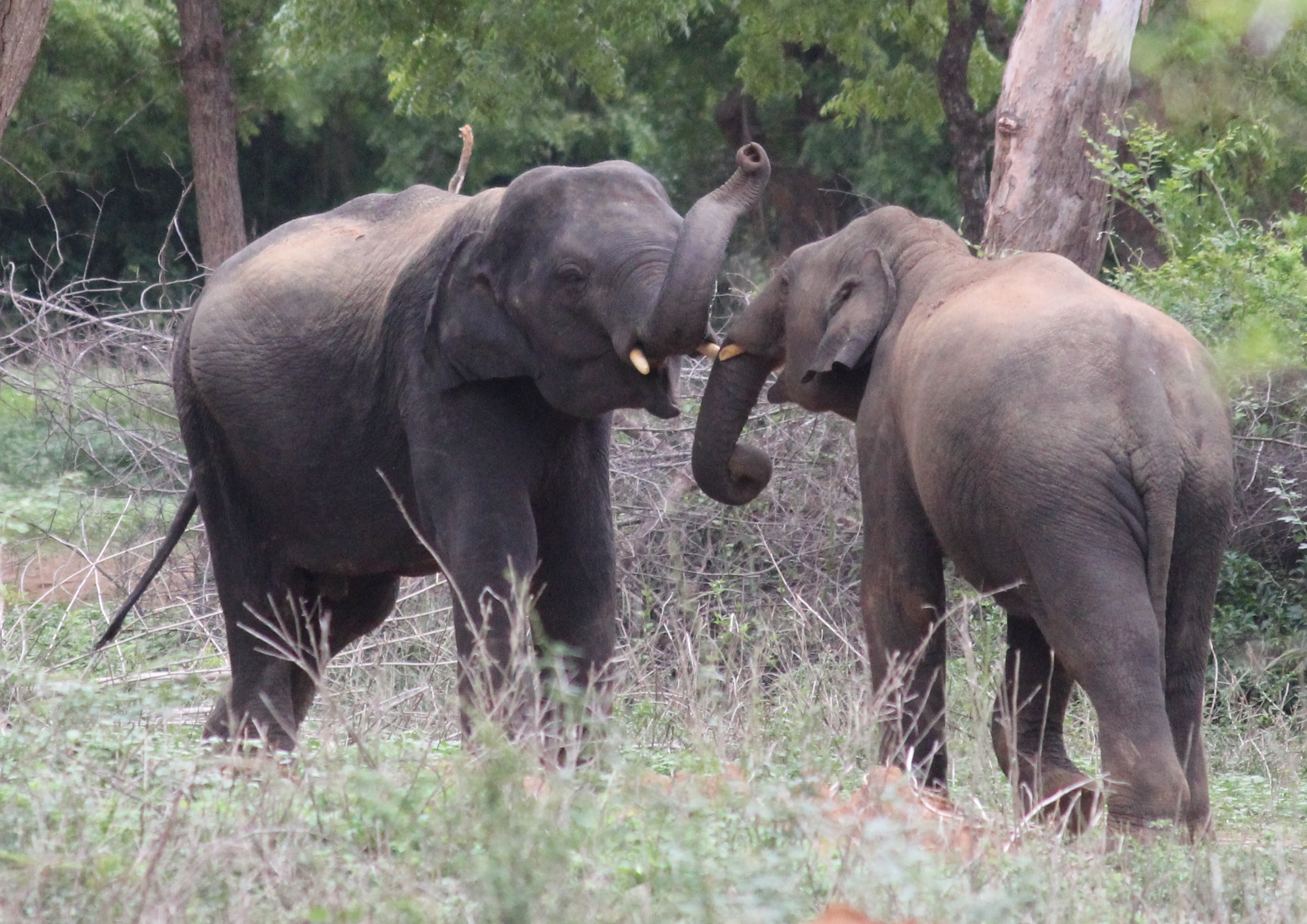
Rescued Indian elephants

Rescue and rehabilitation centre

The zoo has a rescue and rehabilitation centre spread over an area of 92 ha (230 acres). With the banning of training and exhibition of certain species of animals by the Government of India in 1998, the facility was established in 2001 to house the animals recovered from circuses, and their previous owners. The park is one of the five zoos in the country funded for the rehabilitation of these animals. The center is also involved in the rehabilitation of abandoned animals, and animals recovered from wildlife smugglers.

== Education and research ==
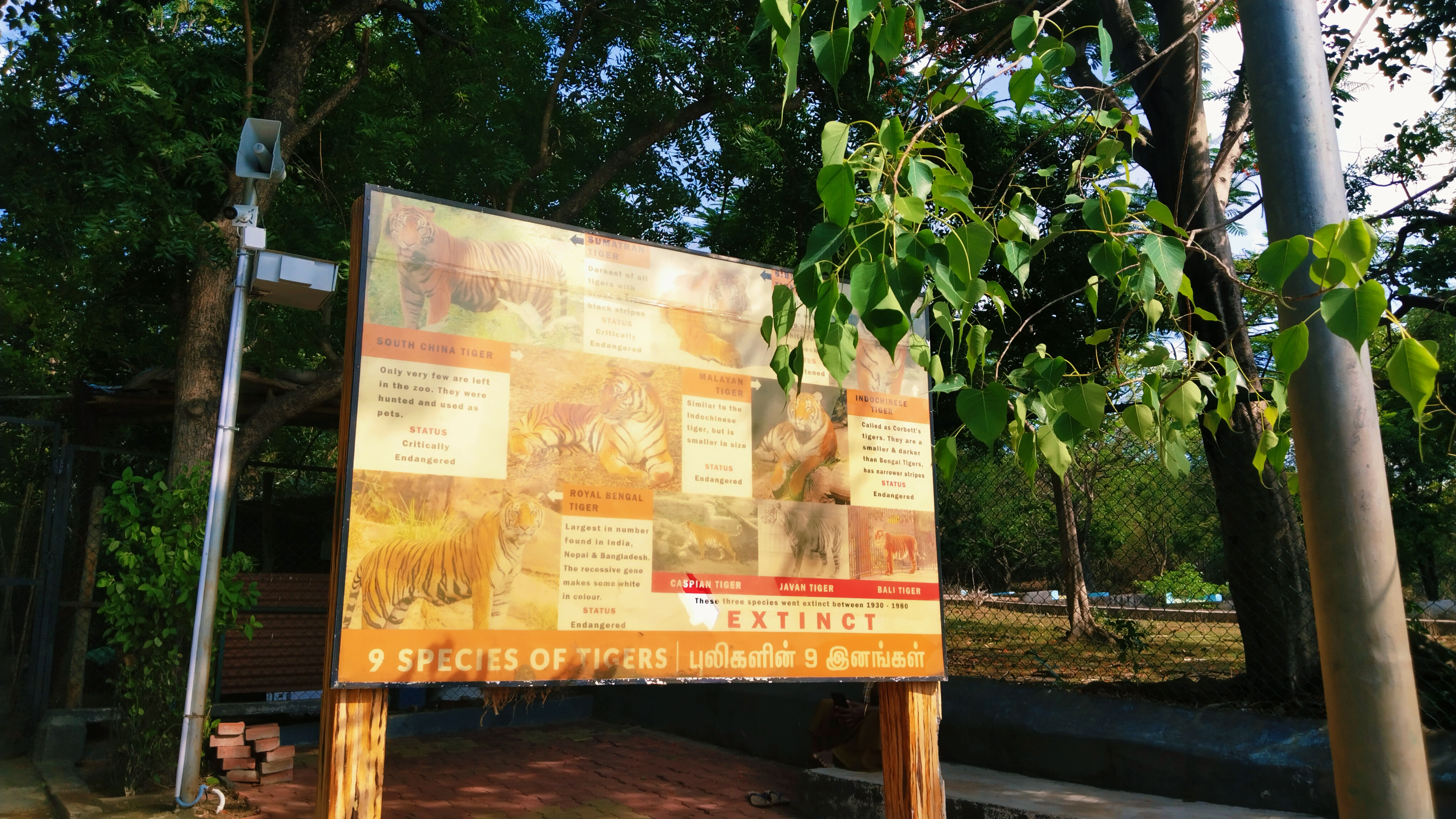
Information board

The park is involved in various education, research and training activities. The zoo administers a zoo school which conducts training programmes for teachers on animal conservation. The school also conducts special education programmes for school and college students on various topics such as animal behaviour, and conservation. The zoo also conducts outreach programmes aimed at education on various endangered species. The zoo club was established in 1998, consisting of volunteers who are involved in sanitation of premises and animal education. The zoo releases a periodic newsletter detailing the activities at the zoo.

In September 2008, the park initiated an animal adoption programme. The first animals were adopted in 2009, and the park raised ₹2.3 million (US$24,000) in 2010-11 from the programme. In 2013, a forest and wildlife museum was established near the entrance, which provides information on various organisms. In April 2018, the zoo launched a mobile application, and live streaming of certain enclosures as a means of education into animal behaviour.

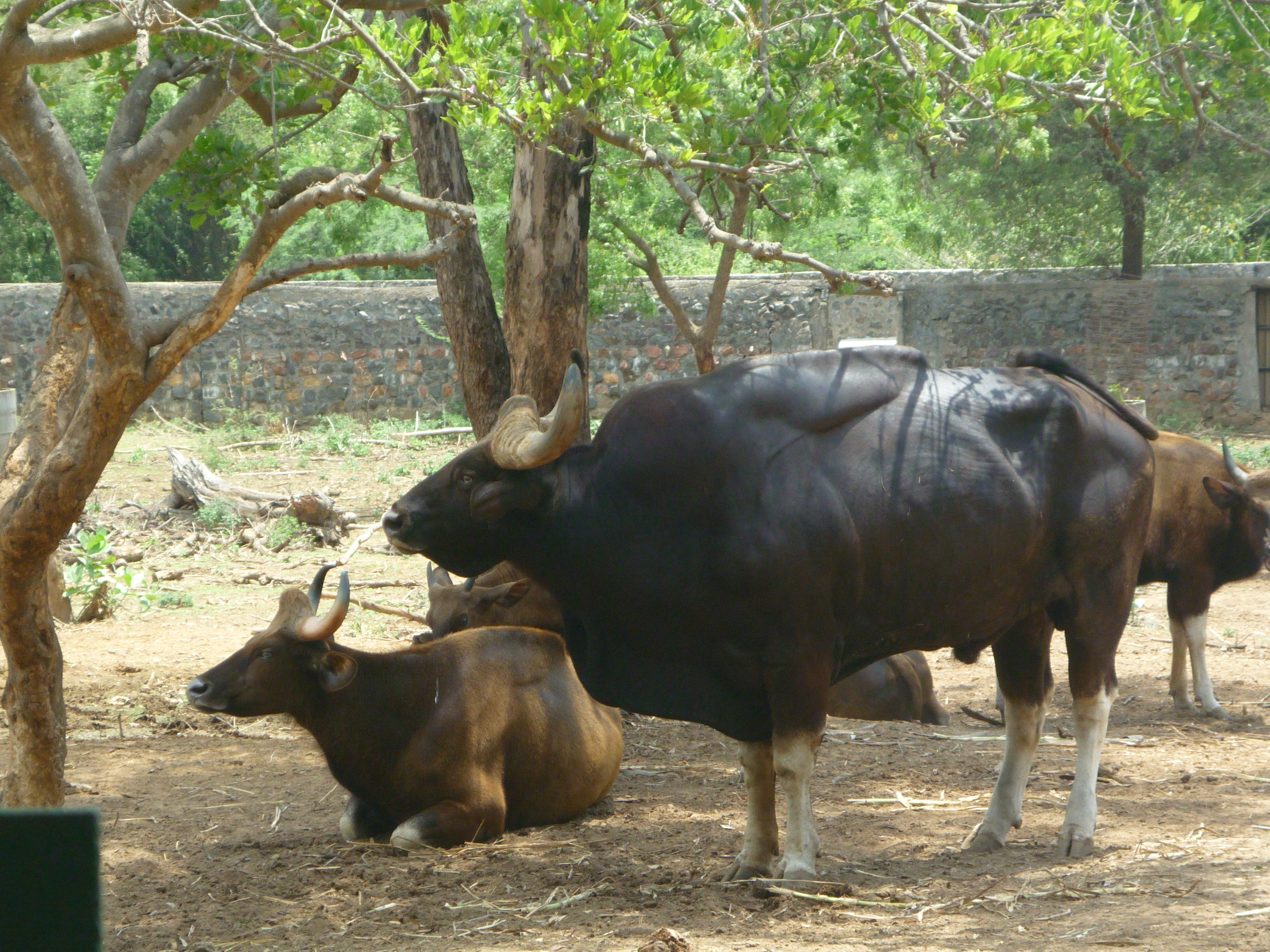
A herd of gaur at the zoo

The park is also involved in various animal research activities. The biologists are involved in the collection of data, research and publication activities of various aspects such as animal housing, healthcare, and behaviour. The research data is utilised to promote conservation, management, and breeding of animals in the zoo. In July 2008, the world's first non-invasive birth control surgery on mugger crocodiles was performed in the park by the surgeons of the Madras Veterinary College at the zoo following research to control breeding. In 2012, the park adopted social grouping of animals in captivity, where members of same species were kept together, to study their interaction in groups. In 2017, a research and training facility was set up at a cost of ₹71.3 million (equivalent to ₹100 million or US$1.0 million in 2023) to conduct research on subjects such as endangered animals and their reproduction, and means to address man–animal conflicts.

== Infrastructure ==
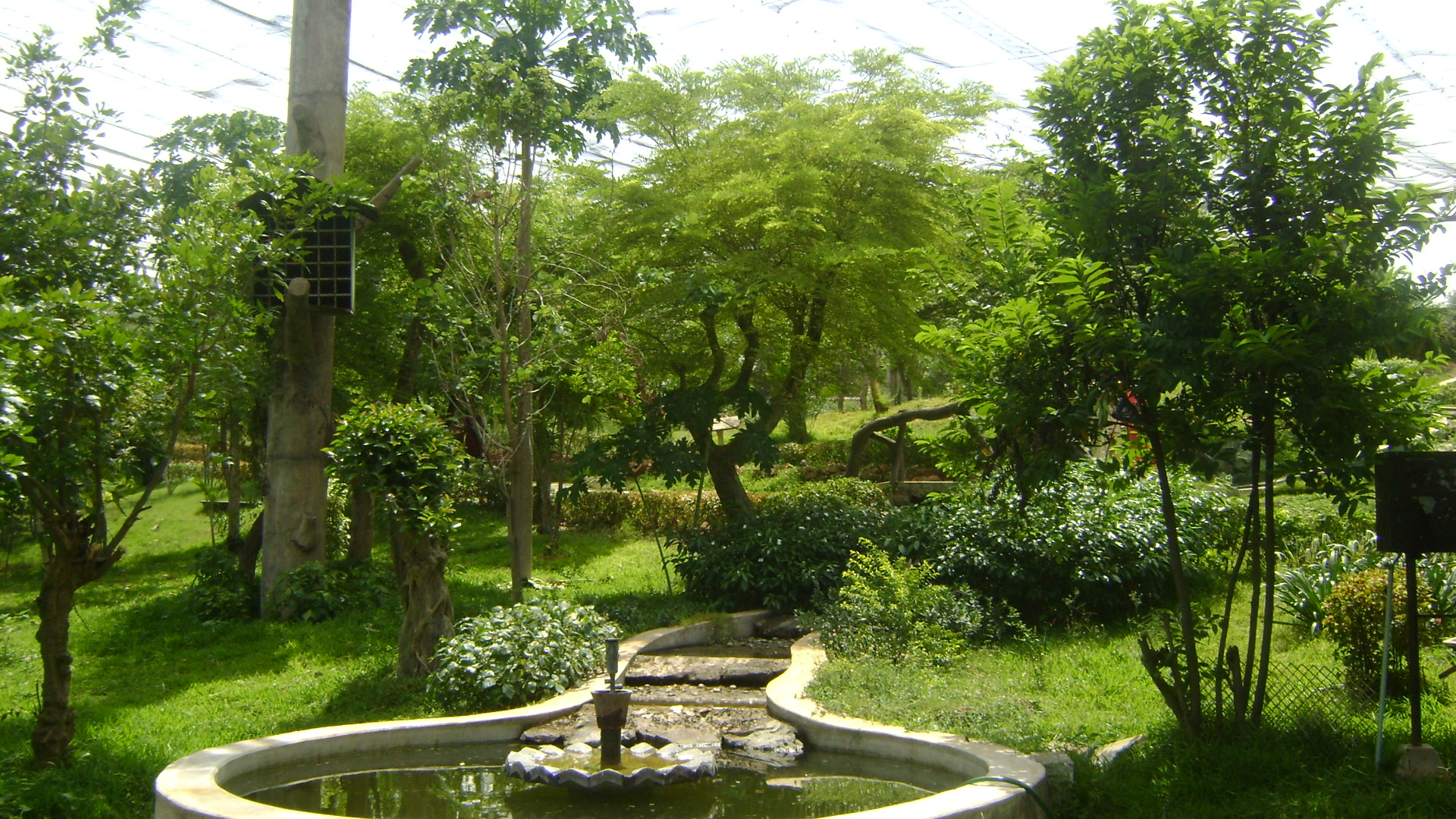
Open water pool

The zoo requires about 600,000 L (160,000 US gal) of water per day for drinking, bathing animals, cleaning enclosures, and cooling. The major water supply comes from the Palar, and is provided by the Tamil Nadu Water Supply and Drainage Board (TWAD). The remainder comes from 13 open wells, five borewells and the Otteri lake within the zoo premises. There are ten water tanks to store the water. In 2011, the zoo constructed rainwater harvesting systems, including small bunds and check dams, to store water during the monsoon that would otherwise be lost. There are three electrical substations which provide power to the zoo. The zoo has back up generators to aid during power failures. In 2011, solar powered lights were installed in 14 enclosures. The zoo authority maintains 4.5 km (2.8 mi) of roads running through the park. The zoo also encloses a staff quarters spread across 7 ha (17 acres) to house the zookeepers and support staff.

== Visitor facilities and patronage ==
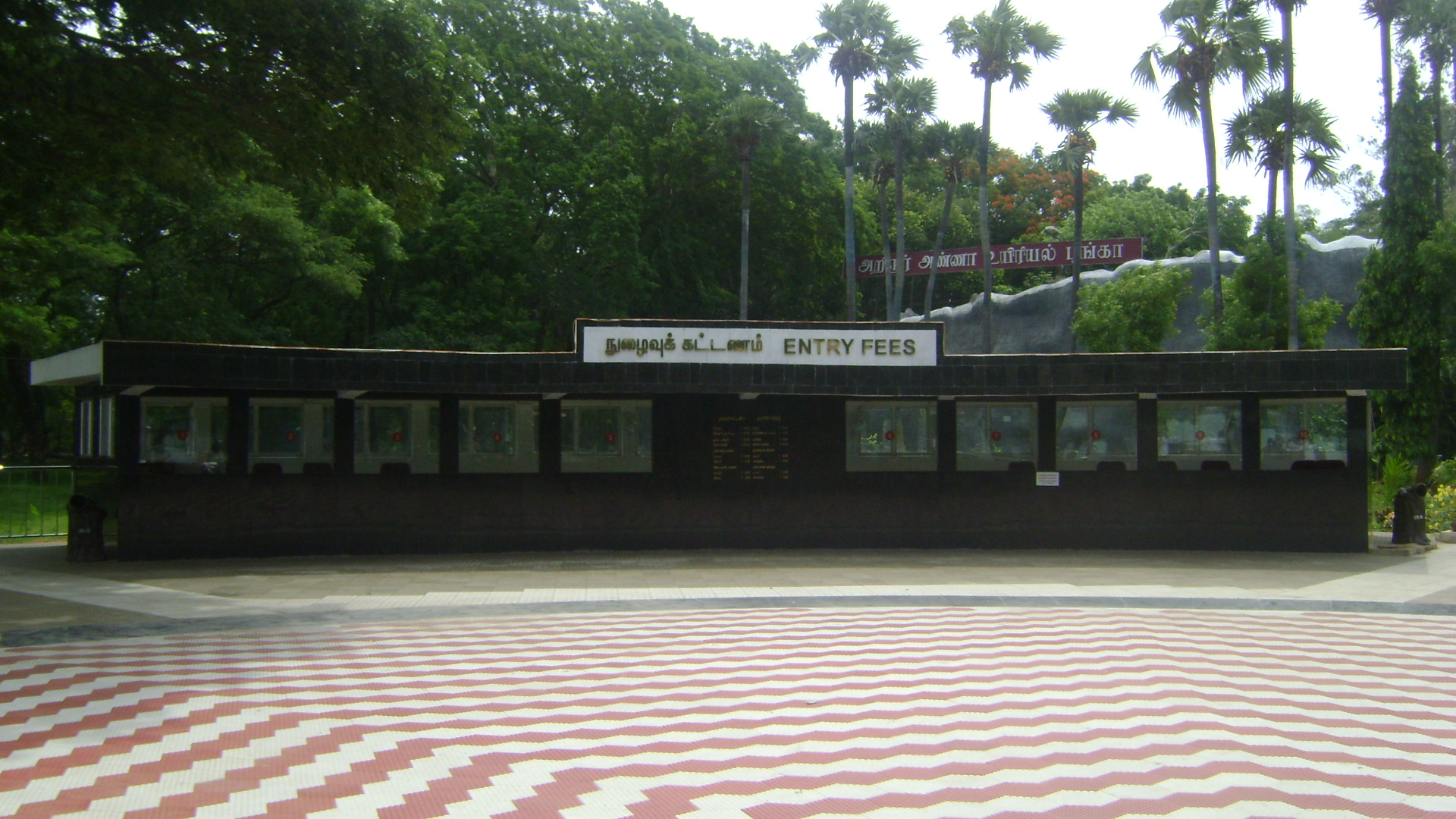
Ticket counters at entrance

The park is open for public from 8:30 to 17:30 on all days except Tuesdays, when the zoo carries out weekly maintenance work. The public are charged an entrance fee, and separate fees for other facilities such as the safari. In 2018, online ticketing was introduced. The visitor reception center has the ticket counters, information centre, a restaurant, cloak rooms, and an auditorium. There is a 6,400 m^{2} (69,000 sq ft) parking space adjoining the facility. Battery electric vehicles, vehicles on rails, and cycles are available for public transit within the park. An elephant safari was introduced in the zoo in 2008, providing a ride on elephants for a tour around the zoo. Refreshment outlets operated by the Tamil Nadu Tourism Development Corporation, restrooms, resting facilities, and first aid facilities are provided the public. The zoo maintains a guest house.

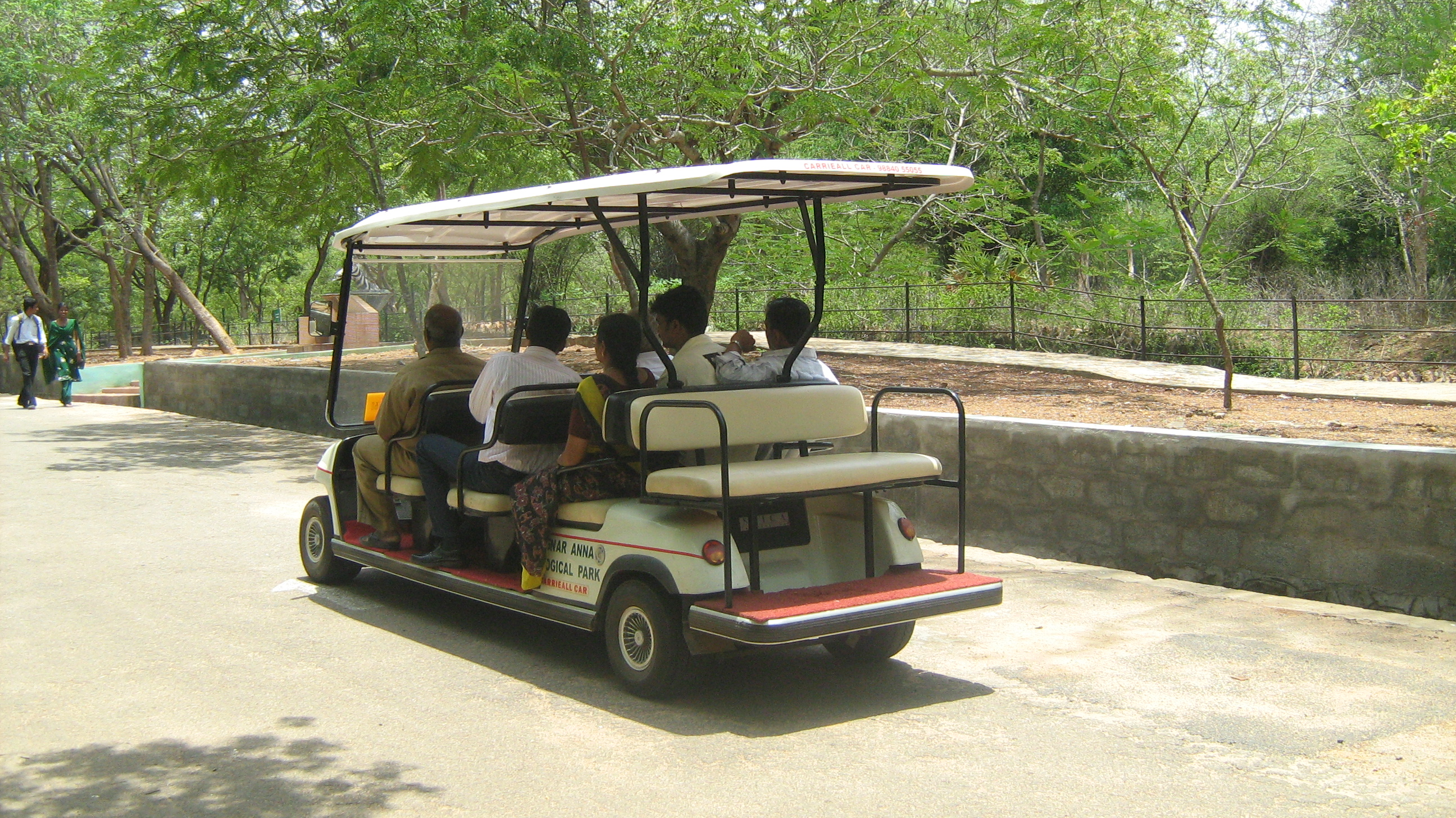
An electric ferry vehicle

The number of visitors to the park vary across days and months. The visitation is higher during public holidays, and festivals. The park receives maximum visitors during the Pongal festival. The park received about 0.72 million visitors in 1999 with gate receipts of ₹4.63 million (equivalent to ₹20 million or US$210,000 in 2023). The visitation substantially increased during the 2000s. The visitation increased to 1.8 million by 2010–11, and the park registered revenues of ₹46.9 million (equivalent to ₹110 million or US$1.1 million in 2023). The number of visitations increased to 2.05 million by 2018–19. During 2018–19, the zoo registered earnings of ₹139.5 million (US$1.4 million) of which ₹126.4 million (US$1.3 million) was from gate receipts. The visitations dropped to 0.4 million in 2020-21 and 0.7 million in 2021-22 due to COVID-19 enforced closure. The park reported revenues of ₹92.9 million (US$960,000) against costs of ₹134.4 million (US$1.4 million) for 2021–22. The number of visitors increased in 2022 post the reopening of the zoo.

== Incidents ==
In January 2002, when a leopard from the Vandalur reserve forest entered into the zoo premises. The zoo was closed for over 45 days before the animal was trapped. On 12 November 2007, a 13 ft (4.0 m) long reticulated python was found in a ventilator inside the pygmy hippopotamus enclosure and bit one of the animal keepers during its capture. According to the zoo officials, the python could have escaped from its enclosure when it was young, about four to five years ago, and was roaming freely inside the zoo while feeding on rodents. On the night of 10 July 2010, three sand boas were reported stolen from the zoo. In January 2011, 50 birds died under mysterious circumstances in the park within a month with a postmortem report revealing that they were poisoned. In September 2011, a nine-feet long Burmese python was reported missing from its enclosure at the serpentarium after the animal keeper forgot to close the snake's enclosure after the weekly clean-up. On 5 December 2011, after about 3 months, the animal was captured by baiting with a chicken.

On 2 August 2011, a 17-year-old male gaur was gored to death by a younger male allegedly over fight for a mate. On 20 August 2017, the same gaur also killed another 20-year-old male in the zoo. On 7 August 2013, a three-year-old male white tiger succumbed to injuries suffered during a fight with its potential mate, a nine-year-old Bengal tigress, and the tigress was also severely injured following the fight. A nine-year old lioness and a 12-year-old lion after contracting COVID-19 in June 2021. Out of 15 lions at the zoo, 11 tested positive for SARS‑CoV‑2. Experts from Tamil Nadu Veterinary and Animal Sciences University were tasked with dealing the outbreak.

== See also ==
- Chennai Snake Park
- Flora and fauna of Chennai
- Guindy National Park
- Madras Crocodile Bank
- Marine Kingdom
