= Flora and fauna of Chennai =

Plants and animals in Chennai, India

The flora and fauna of Chennai are the plants and animals in Chennai, India.

== Beaches ==
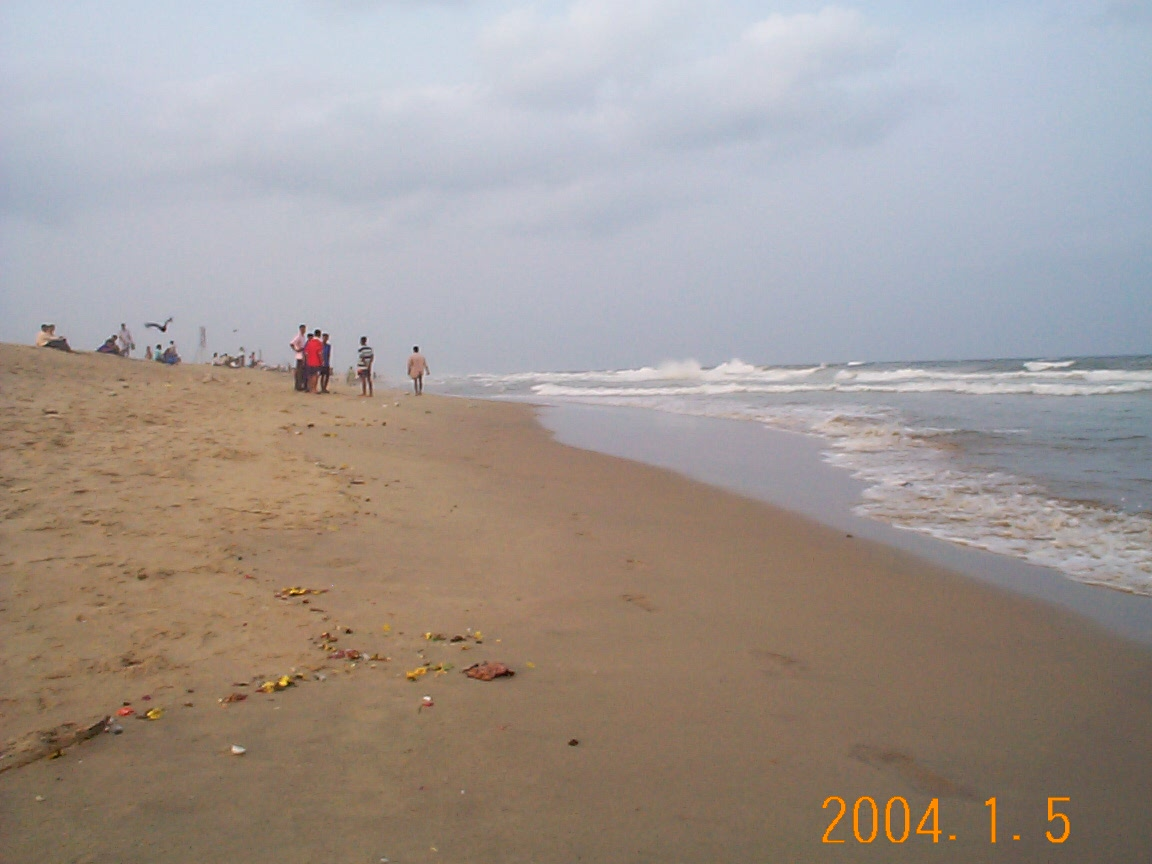
Facing north on Elliot's Beach in Besant Nagar.

Marina Beach is the country's longest urban beach, and its 13-km length is often subdivided into more manageable units. The northern part of the beach (immediately south of the Cooum River) is simply known as the Marina and is followed by Santhome Beach, which lies north of the Adyar river estuary. Chennai Lighthouse is located on Marina Beach.

South of the Adyar, the first section is called Elliot's Beach or Besant Nagar beach and is followed by the Tiruvanmiyur Beach, the Kottivakkam Beach and the Neelangarai Beach. The beach is visited by most people in the late afternoon and evening, when the sea breeze effect is at its strongest. It is also favoured by joggers at dawn.

Before the Madras Harbour was built, the Marina Beach was just a strip of mud, teeming with mudskippers.

== Flora and fauna ==
The earliest-known documentation of plants in what was then called Madras dates to 1853, in a book titled Hortus Madraspatensis by the then conservator of forests, Hugh Cleghorn. The green cover in the city remains at 4%, while the state has 19.6% of forest cover.

Guindy National Park, in the south of the city, is the country's smallest national park, with an area of 2.76 km^{2}. This is also a rare national park that is located completely inside a large city. It has a scrub forest and the animals found here include chital and black buck, many species of snakes, birds, insects, and the like. The adjoining IIT campus also holds many black bucks, spotted deer, bonnet monkeys, palm civets, mongoose, many species of birds, snakes, insects, and the like. A small deer population also thrives in the nearby Anna University campus. The Guindy National Park and the adjoining IIT Madras campus play a vital role in cleaning the city's atmosphere and is several degrees cooler than the city in summer.

The Adyar Eco Park, also known as Tholkappia Poonga, is set up by the Government of Tamil Nadu to restore and protect the fragile ecosystem of Adyar estuary and creek. It is developed in a way to promote eco-tourism.

The Arignar Anna Zoological Park (better known as Vandalur Zoo) is located southwest of the city and covers an area of 5.1 km^{2}. The zoo was formerly located in Park Town under the name Madras Zoo and was the oldest zoo in the country (established 1854). It was moved to its current suburban location in 1980. It has about eighty species on display and includes a lion safari and two aviaries.

The southern stretches of the beach, from Tiruvanmiyur to Neelangarai, are favoured by the endangered olive ridley turtles to lay their eggs every winter, as are other beaches in Tamil Nadu and Odisha. At that time, many conservation volunteers work on the beach during the night to protect the eggs or to remove them to a hatchery. Hatchlings are usually released to the sea in March or April.

South of the city, along the East Coast Road, is the Madras Crocodile Bank Trust, which hosts several fresh-water and salt-water crocodiles, alligators, gharials, and also turtles and snakes. It is considered an important institute for herpetological research and performs services such as snake venom extraction for preparing antidotes.

A large number of cattle egrets, pond herons and other waterbirds can be seen in the rivers of Cooum and Adyar. In addition, the Government of India has plans to classify the Adyar Estuary into a protected eco-system. About 75,000 birds migrate to Chennai every year.

Marshy wetlands such as Pallikaranai also play host to a number of migratory birds during the monsoon and winter. It is one of the prioritized wetlands of Tamil Nadu. Unfortunately, this wetland is being degraded by pollution and garbage dumping and is converted into housing colonies, railway termini, institutions, and the like with disregard for its wildlife and ecosystem values. However, steps are being taken to restore this marshland. Nearly half of the native plant species in the city's wetlands have disappeared in recent years. The city, which had 85 percent of its area covered with aquatic plants until the 1970s, now has only 25 percent of its area covered with such plants.

Over 300 species of birds have been recorded in the city and its neighbourhood by members of Madras Naturalists' Society since its inception in 1978. The society aims at raising awareness among the citizens, particularly students, on the importance of wildlife in the city and conservation. They have regular meetings every month and publish monthly newsletter and a quarterly journal Blackbuck. They also organise outings and camps for members.

There were records of wild cats such as tiger, leopard, panther and even cheetahs roaming in the suburbs of Chennai, as late as the 1980s. Foxes, jackals, chital (spotted deer), black buck, monkeys and other rare species of animals can still be spotted in the Indian Institute of Technology Madras.

== Arignar Anna Zoological Park ==
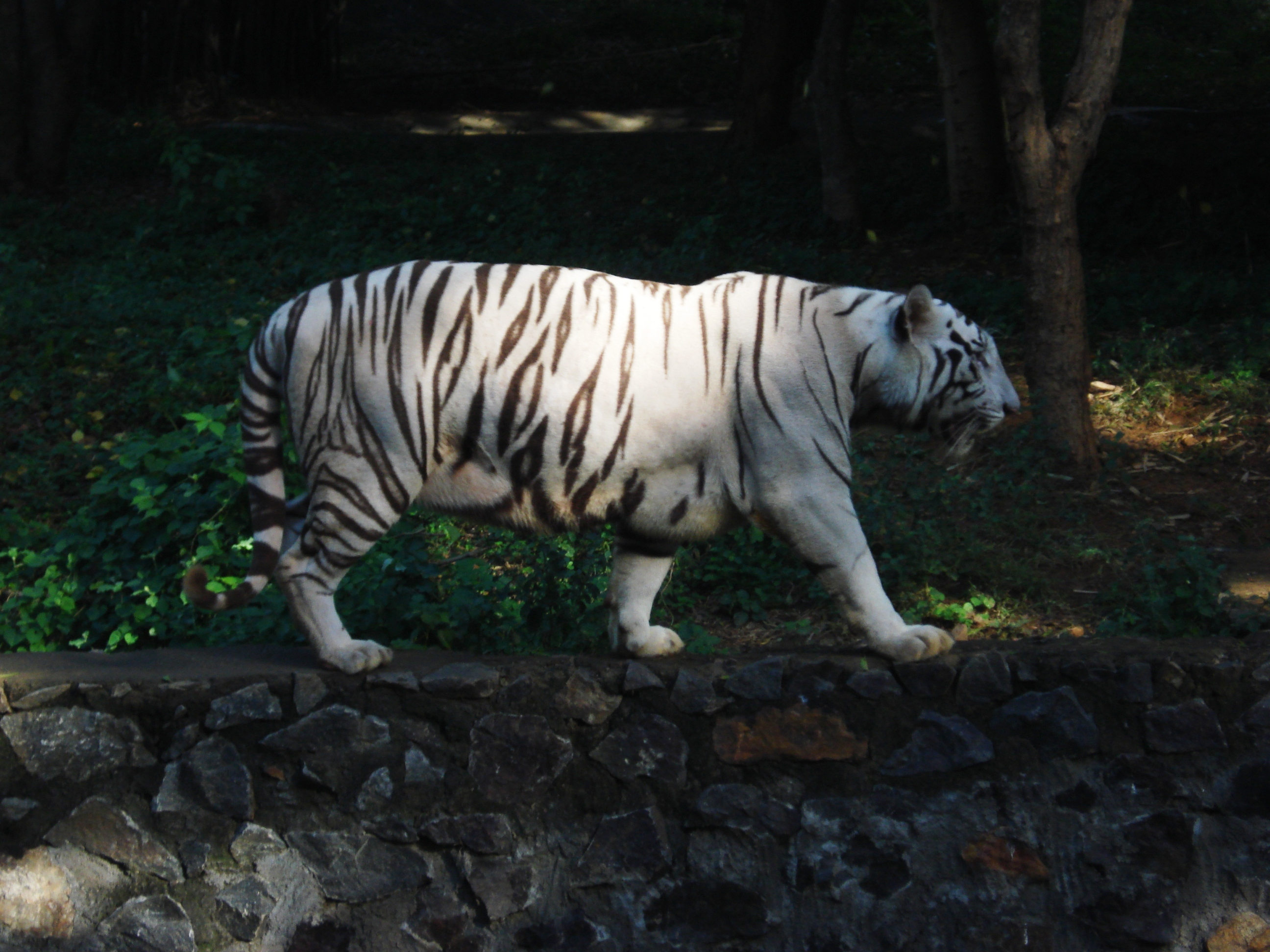
White tiger at Anna Zoological Park

Chennai has the distinction of having the first zoo in India as early as 1855. The first zoo was located in Moore Market, near Ripon Building. With increasing traffic noise, and the demand for People's Park land for other services, it was decided in 1976 the zoo had to move. It was moved to the Vandalur Reserve Forest in 1979 by the Tamil Nadu Forest Department. The zoo is spread over 510 ha. of dry evergreen forests with gentle undulating terrain open wet and dryland type enclosures, specially developed to simulate natural environment for the animals. After the zoo was inaugurated in 1985, it has undergone improvements, with new animals making their home and breeding.

Today there are some 81 enclosures – six types of deer: barking deer, sambar, blackbuck, nilgai, sangai, hog deer. A number of monkey species from Nilgiri langur to the endangered lion-tailed macaque, baboon, Hanuman langur and leaf-capped langur, wolf, jackal, hyena, llama, otter, an aviary for Vedantangal birds and another for Point Calimere birds, then enclosures for the higher carnivores like the tiger, lion, panther, and jaguar, as well as grazers such as elephants, giraffes and camels.

Near every enclosure, there are stone boards talking about the zoological name, its feeding, mating and breeding habits and seasons apart from the place where it is endemic. And trees have placards with their botanical names and other details.

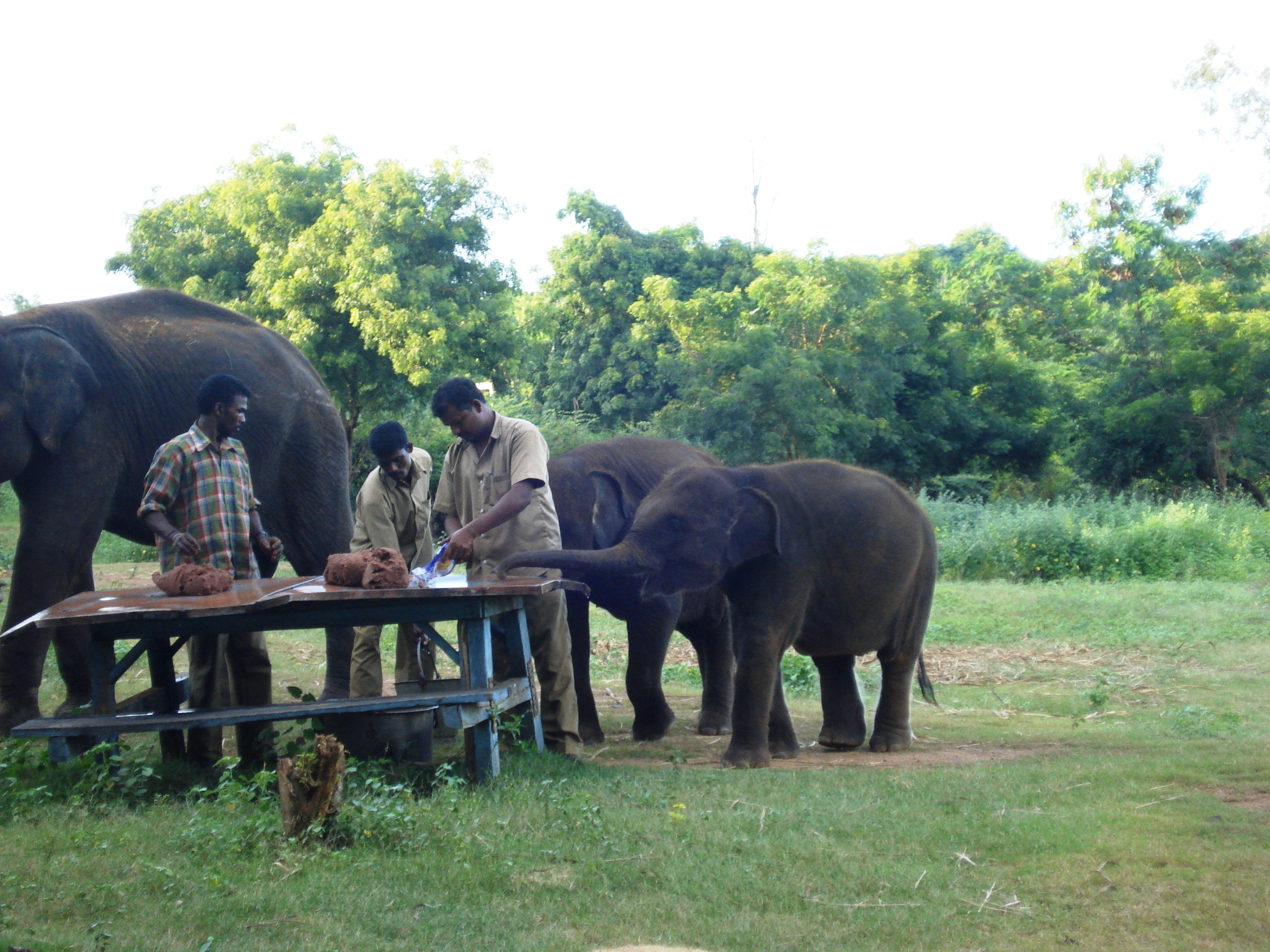
Zoo keepers feeding the elephants and the calves at Anna Zoological Park

A library is open to public on Mondays and Fridays. The zoo is open 6 days a week from 9-6 PM though ticket sales close an hour earlier, Tuesday being a holiday. For those of you who may find the long trek inside a bit arduous, you can ride on the battery vehicles plying inside, for a fee. Environmental awareness and education form an integral part of the zoo's activities. They have launched education programmes for students (pre-primary, primary and higher secondary and college) and teachers and other visitors. And now they are having a zoo volunteer program in which anyone who wants to work inside the place can apply.

Apart from this, members of the Student Zoo Club get valuable experience as they get exposed to adventure while getting educated about wildlife management, conservation, animal behaviour, their habitats, ecosystems, evolution, animal adaptations, reproduction, nutrition, animal housing and husbandry. The membership is open for two years for which they also get a certificate. The club currently has about 150 members.
