= Nanmangalam Reserve Forest =

Forest in India

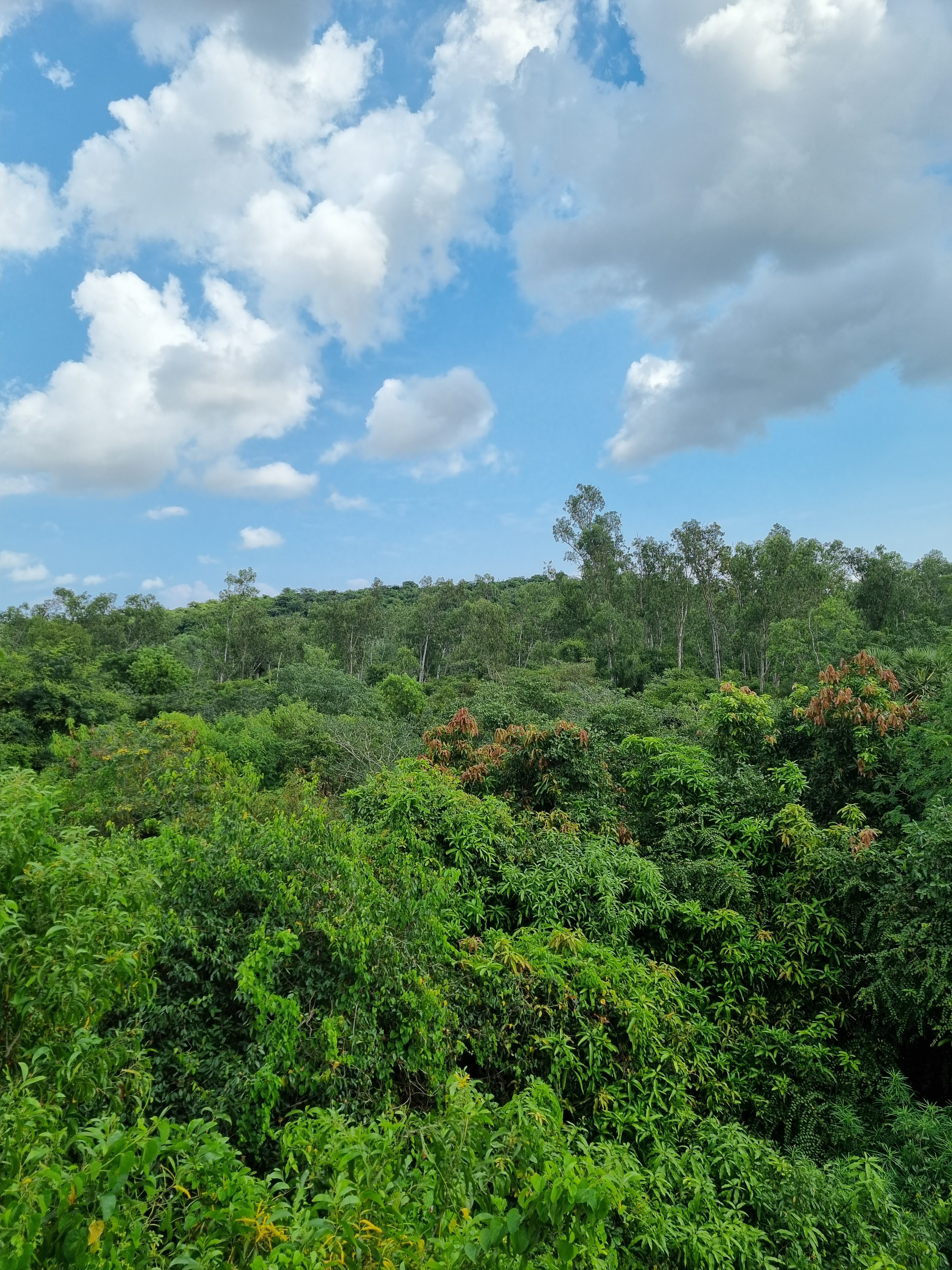
- Nanmangalam Reserve Forest

- Location within Chennai
- Location: Chengalpattu District, Tamil Nadu, India
- Nearest city: Chennai
- Coordinates: 12.927°N 80.172°E
- Area: 3.2 km^{2} (1.2 sq mi)
- Governing body: Tamil Nadu Forest Department
- Website: forests.tn.nic.in

Nanmangalam Reserve Forest is a protected forest located in Chengalpattu district, about 24 km from the city centre. It is located at Medavakkam on Velachery High Road between Velachery and Tambaram. The reserve forest has an area of 320 hectares. However, the total area of the forest is 2,400 hectares.

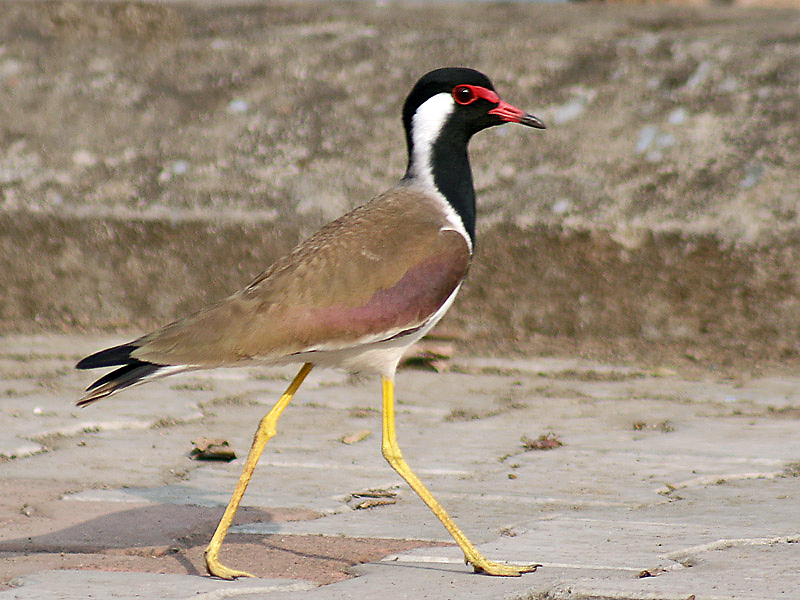
Red-wattled lapwing

== The forest ==
The forest is popular among bird watchers and is home to about 85 species of birds. Red-wattled lapwing, hoopoe, crested honey buzzard, grey partridge, coucal, Indian eagle-owl, white-breasted kingfisher, pied kingfisher, southern bush lark and red-whiskered bulbul are commonly seen in the area.

The 320-hectare Nanmangalam Reserved Forest, located about 10 km from Velachery, is a scrubland around an abandoned granite quarry and is home to some of the rare territorial orchids, according to a recent study.

The neighbourhood of Nanmangalam is one of the 163 notified areas (megalithic sites) in the state of Tamil Nadu.

== See also ==
- Birding in Chennai
- Vandalur Reserve Forest
- Vedanthangal Bird Sanctuary
