= People's Park, Chennai =

Recreational park in the city of Chennai, India

People's Park
- Interactive map of People's Park
- Type: Urban park
- Location: Park Town, Chennai, India
- Coordinates: 13.073444°N 80.273222°E
- Created: Between 1859 and 1861
- Operator: Corporation of Chennai
- Status: Open all year

People's Park is a recreational park in the city of Chennai, India. Constructed between 1859 and 1861, the park is one of the oldest parks and the most famous one in the city.

== History ==
The idea of setting up the park was floated by Sir Charles Trevelyan, 1st Baronet, Governor of Madras in 1859–60. He also approved the plan and began the construction activities on the site. Following Trevelyan's dismissal in 1860, the work was continued by his successor William Denison. The park was eventually completed in 1861 and a Committee of Management appointed to maintain it.

== Geography ==
The park extended for about 112 acres at one point of time and was the biggest of its kind in Chennai. There were 12 lakes within the limits of the park apart from five and half miles of road. Boating facilities were available on Victoria Lake. There was also a metalled road in the eastern corner of the park called "The Equestrians' Ride". The Madras zoological park was located in People's Park before being shifted to Vandalur in 1985.

The neighbourhood of Parktown gets its name from People's Park. The park is now in a neglected state and most of its land has been encroached upon.

== See also ==
- Parks in Chennai
