= Vandalur Reserve Forest =

Protected area of Tamil Nadu

Coordinates: 12.894268°N 80.096684°E

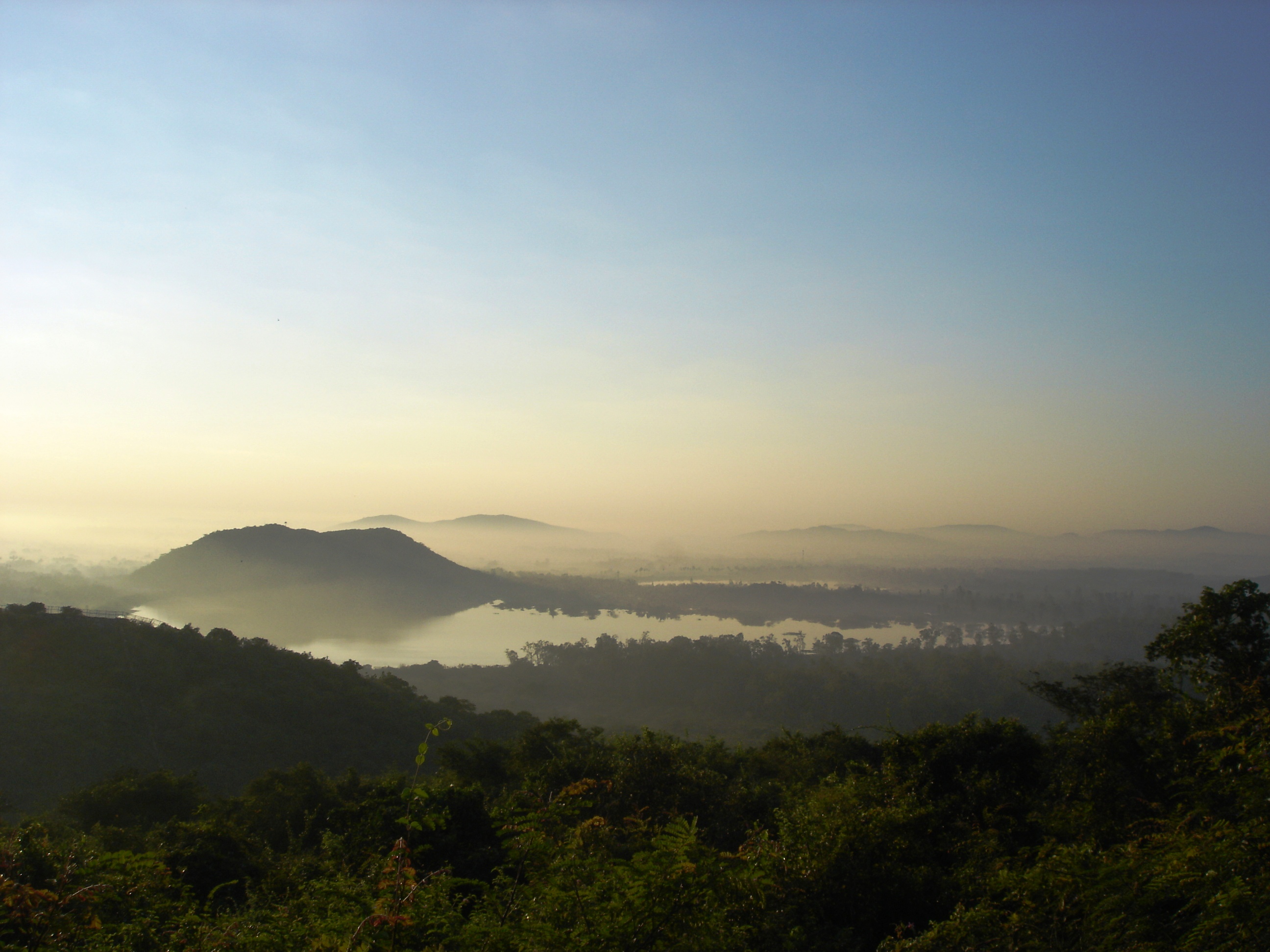
South-Eastern side of Vandalur Hill

Vandalur Reserve Forest is a protected area located in the suburb of Vandalur to the southwestern part of Chennai, about 30 km from the city centre. It is bordered by the Grand Southern Trunk (GST) Road in the west and Suddhanandha Bharathi Street on the northern and the eastern sides and is intersected by the Vandalur–Kelambakkam Road on the southern side. The reserve forest contains Arignar Anna Zoological Park, the largest zoological garden in the Indian subcontinent.

== History ==
In 1976, a portion of the reserve forest covering 1,265 acres (512 ha) was demarcated by the Tamil Nadu Forest Department as the new location for the Madras Zoo, initially located in Park Town. Work started in 1979 at an initial cost of ₹ 75 million, and the zoo was opened to public on 24 July 1985 as the Arignar Anna Zoological Park. In 2001, another 92.45 hectares (228.4 acres) of land from the reserve forest, located adjacent to the zoo, was augmented with the zoo to build a rescue and rehabilitation center for confiscated and abandoned wild animals, increasing the zoo's size to 602 hectares (1,490 acres).

== See also ==
- Arignar Anna Zoological Park
- Nanmangalam Reserve Forest
