= Common bronzeback =

There are two species of snake named common bronzeback:

- Dendrelaphis pictus
- Dendrelaphis tristis
