= Park Town, Chennai =

Neighborhood of Chennai, India

Park Town
- Neighbourhood
- Location within Chennai Location within Tamil Nadu Location within India
- Coordinates: 13.0798°N 80.2776°E
- Country: India
- State: Tamil Nadu
- District: Chennai District
- Metro: Chennai
- Zone: Pulianthope
- Ward: 47
- Talukas: Fort-Tondiarpet

Government
  - Body: Chennai Corporation

Languages
  - Official: Tamil
- Time zone: UTC+5:30 (IST)
- PIN: 600 003
- Lok Sabha constituency: Chennai North
- Planning agency: CMDA
- Civic agency: Chennai Corporation
- Website: www.chennai.tn.nic.in

Park Town is a neighbourhood in downtown Chennai (formerly Madras), India. It lies adjacent to the historical neighbourhood of George Town. The area got its name from the People's Park which was situated near the Ripon Building. It was earlier known as White Town, as the Europeans used to stay here.

Today the area is a major transit hub with all the 3 Chennai's suburban lines and the MRTS line converging here. It also houses several key Government offices.

Major Government landmarks include:

- Chennai Central
- Chennai Corporation
- Government General Hospital
- Madras Medical College
- Southern Railway headquarters

The three Chennai's suburban routes and Chennai MRTS cross through Park Town, which makes it a popular transit point. The Park Town MRTS station is situated behind the Government General Hospital. Chennai Park is one of the busiest suburban stations in the city. Both the stations lie opposite to Chennai Central Terminus. Additionally, two lines of the Chennai Metro will meet at Chennai Central metro station, which is located in this zone. Hence, in the near future, Park Town area will become a bigger transit or interchange zone for 6 different railway lines which comprise the 3 suburban lines, 1 MRTS line and 2 Metro lines. The arterial Poonamallee High Road, which passes through the neighbourhood, is the most important road in Park Town.

== Politics ==
Park Town assembly constituency is part of Chennai Central (Lok Sabha constituency).

== Gallery ==
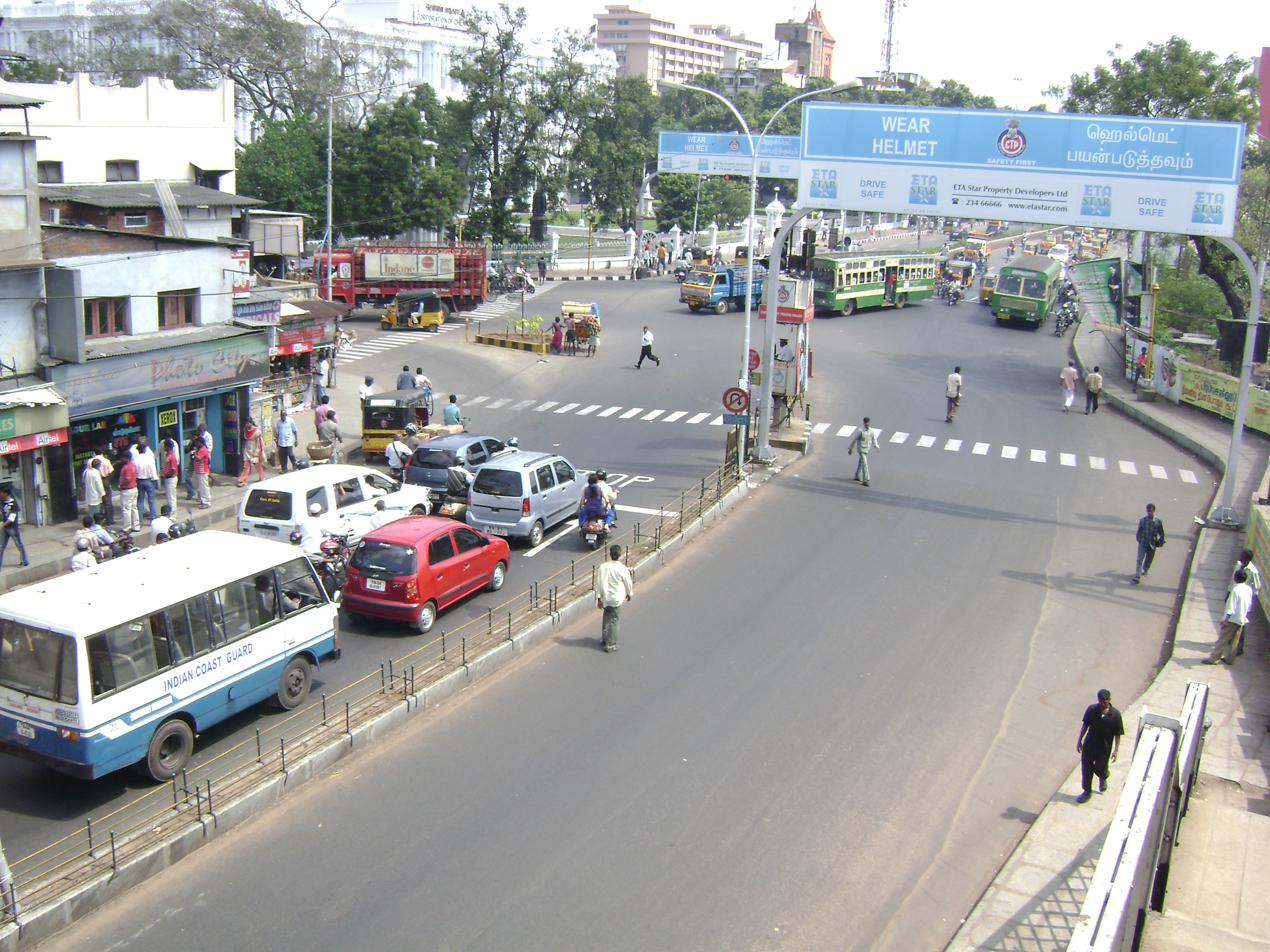
Traffic Signal at Poonamallee High Road, Park Town, Chennai

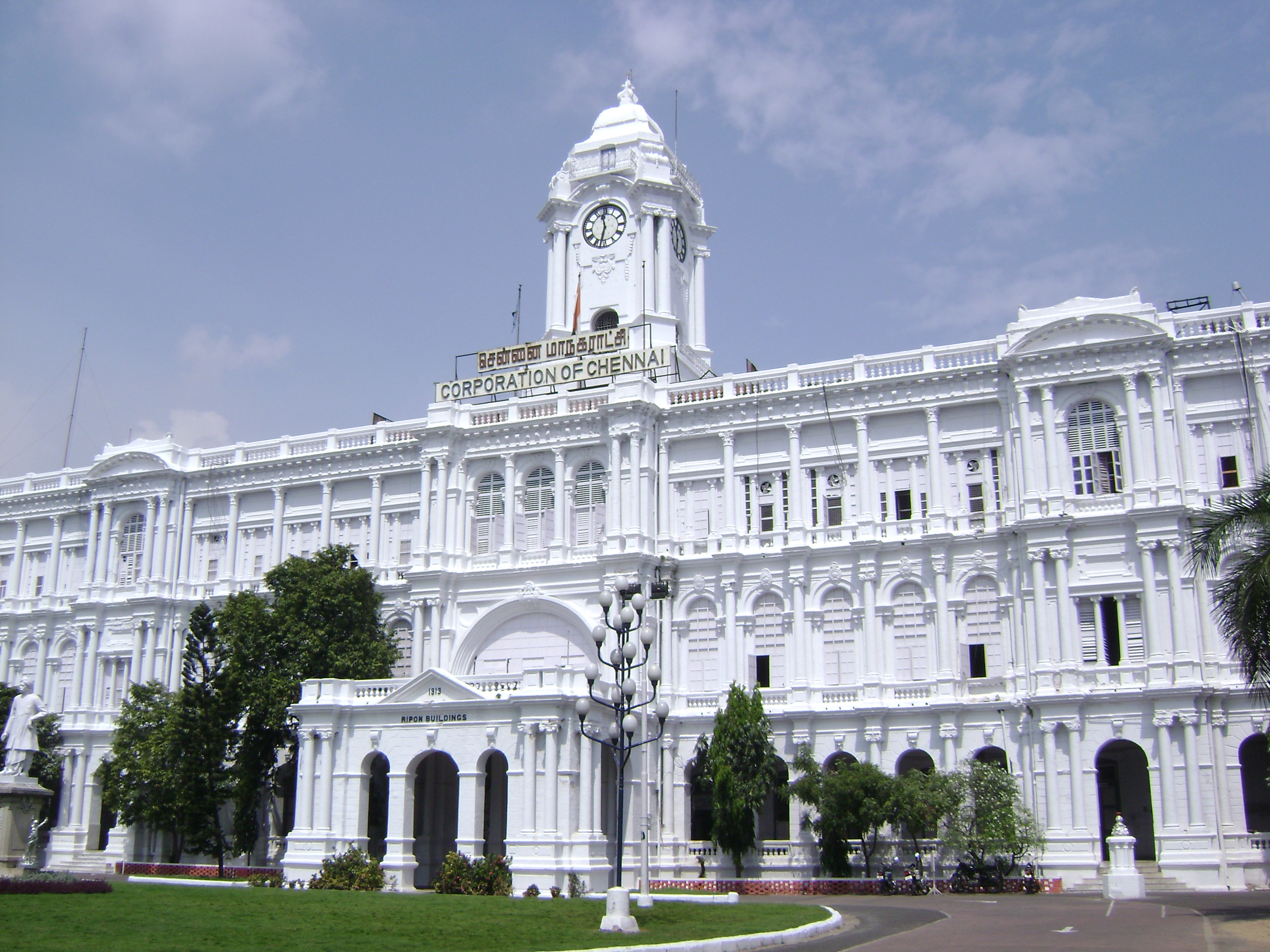
Ripon Building - which houses the Chennai Corporation, Park Town, Chennai

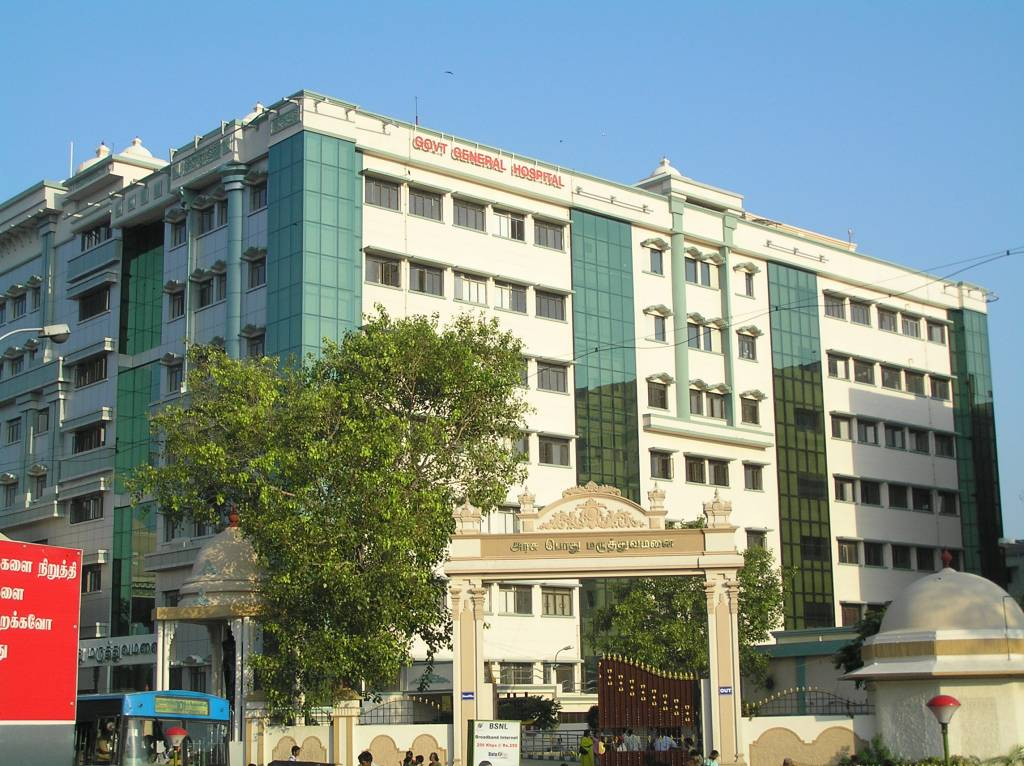
Government General Hospital, Park Town, Chennai

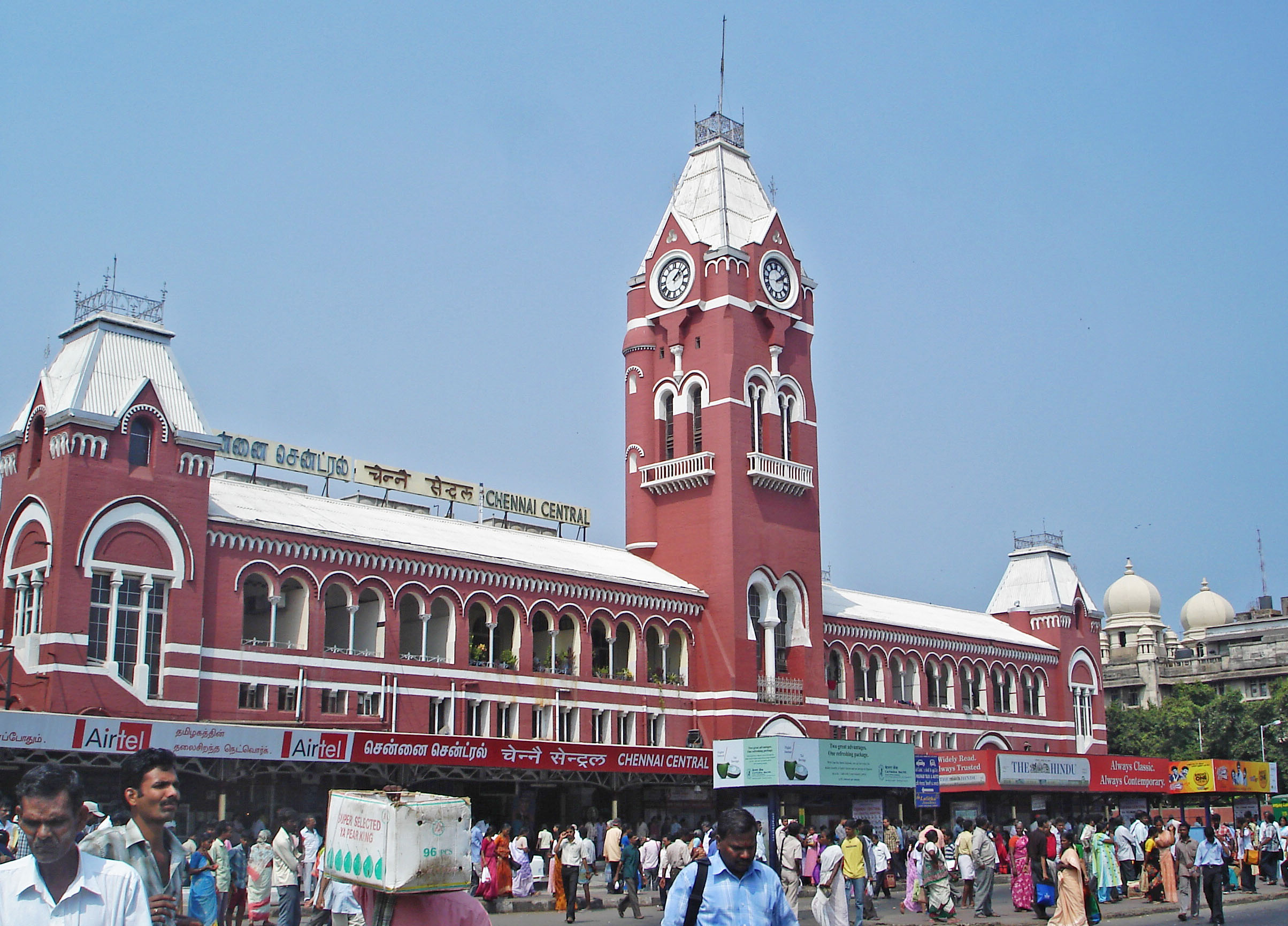
Chennai Central Railway Station, Park Town, Chennai

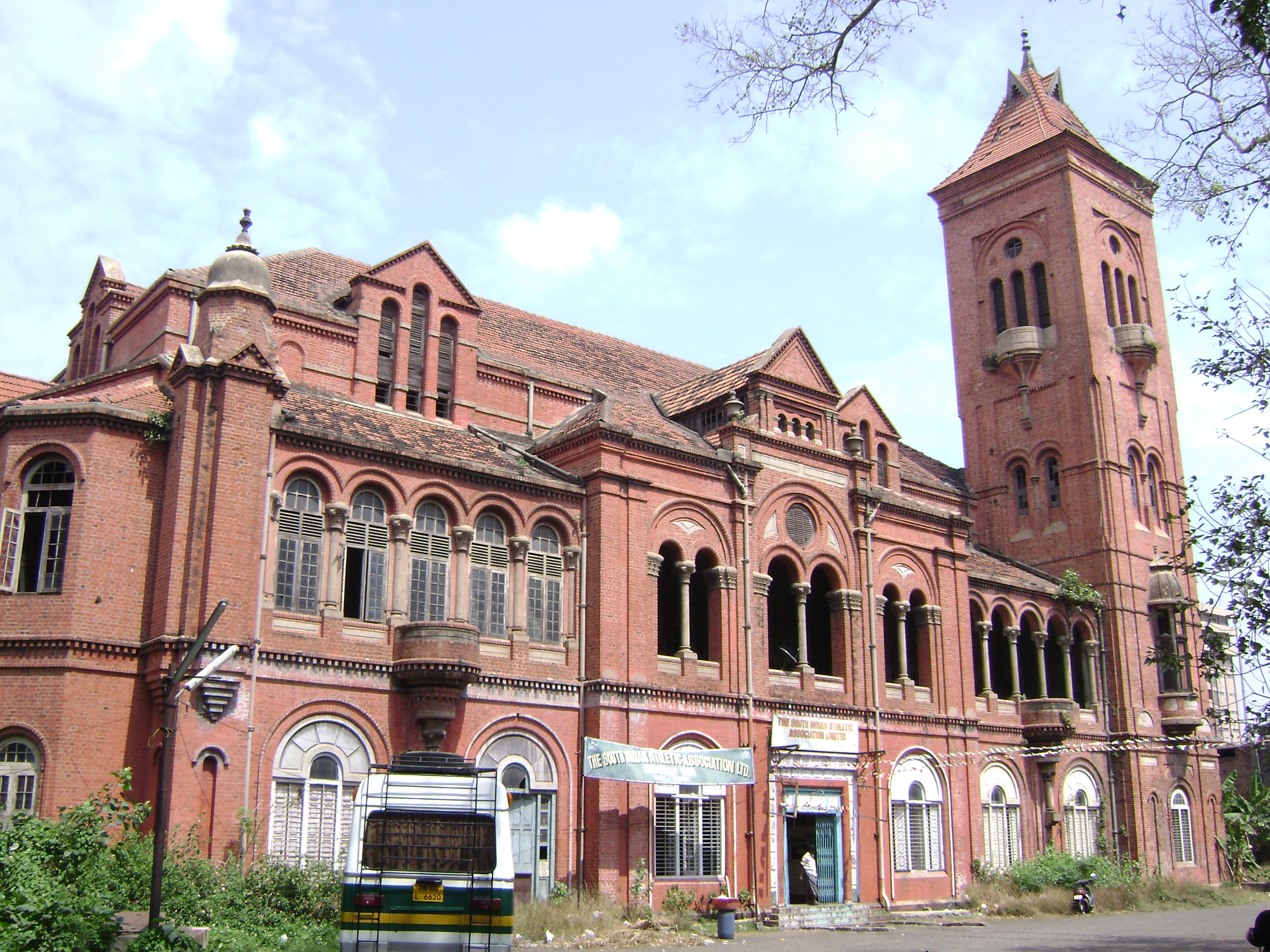
Victoria Public Hall, Park Town, Chennai
