= Chennai Snake Park =

Indian non-profit organization

Chennai Snake Park Trust
- Abbreviation: CSPT
- Formation: 1972
- Type: NGO
- Legal status: Non-profit public trust
- Purpose: Herpetofaunal conservation, research and education
- Headquarters: Chennai
- Location: Rajbhavan Post, Guindy, Chennai 600022
- Coordinates: 13.0040°N 80.2380°E
- Region served: India
- Official language: Tamil, English
- Founder: Romulus Whitaker
- Main organ: Board of Trustees
- Affiliations: CZA
- Website: cspt.in

The Chennai Snake Park, officially the Chennai Snake Park Trust, is a not-for-profit non-governmental organization constituted in 1972 by herpetologist Romulus Whitaker and is India's first reptile park. Also known as the Guindy Snake Park, it is located next to the Children's Park in the Guindy National Park campus. Located on the former home of the Madras Crocodile Bank Trust, the park is home to a wide range of snakes such as adders, pythons, vipers, cobras and other reptiles. The park gained statutory recognition as a medium zoo from the Central Zoo Authority in 1995.

== History ==
The park, formerly known as the Madras Snake Park Trust (MSPT), was established by the American-born naturalised Indian herpetologist Romulus Whitaker, who is no longer associated with the Trust. Before returning to India in 1967, Romulus Whitaker had worked with the Miami Serpentarium at Florida, United States. On his arrival to India, he established a small snake park at Selaiyur village, a suburb of Chennai. In 1972, he obtained a piece of land in Guindy on lease from the Forest Department of the Government of Tamil Nadu and, with the help of a group of naturalists from Chennai, set up a bigger park and soon constituted a trust to manage its affairs. The Board of Trustees consisted of Doris N. Chattopadhyaya, Harry Miller, M. V. Rajendran, S. Meenakshisundaram, M. Krishnan, Romulus Whitaker and A. N. Jagannatha Rao. In 1976 and 1988, ex officio trustees from various government institutions were added to the board. Mr. Romulus Whitaker is no longer associated with the Trust The park underwent various renovations after 1994, including an aquarium for sea snakes and turtles and restoration of enclosures and additional facilities.

== Organizational structure ==
The chairman of the board of trustees is also the chief executive of the park holding a part-time and honorary position. The director, assisted by an environmental education officer, heads the full-time staff constituting 20 employees. There are eight animal keepers in the park, of whom five are from the Irula tribe, traditionally known for their occupation of snake-catching.

== Objectives ==
The stated objectives of the park include the following:

- To maintain and display a captive collection of snakes and other reptiles as a means of eliciting public interest in them and prompting the public to empathize with them.
- To promote knowledge among the public on reptiles and amphibians and dispel the widespread erroneous beliefs about snakes in particular and, to this end, conduct awareness programmes targeting school children primarily and bring out low-priced publications with technical, semi-technical and popular contents on reptiles and amphibians.
- To aid and assist research on reptiles and amphibians including the conduct of surveys to assess their status and distribution.
- To undertake captive breeding of endangered species of snakes and other reptiles.
- To canvas public support for the protection and conservation of reptiles and amphibians.

== The park ==
The park covers an area of 1 acre in the Guindy National Park campus. The land is taken on a long-term lease agreement with the Government of Tamil Nadu on a nominal rental. Accessibility to the park is provided by a small road linked to Sardar Vallabhai Patel Road. The park attracts about 700,000 visitors annually, of whom one fifth are children, generating a revenue of about ₹ 6 million.

Group	Number of species (as on 1 October 2010)
Snake	23
Crocodile	7
Turtle/Tortoise	3
Lizard	6
Total	39

As of 2010, the park exhibits a total of 39 species, including 23 species of Indian snakes, all 3 Indian species and 4 exotic species of crocodiles, 3 species of Indian tortoises and turtles and 6 species of the larger Indian lizards. Snake species on display include reticulated python, Indian rock python, common krait, Russell's viper, saw-scaled viper, Indian rat snake, red sand boa, common sand boa, dog-faced water snakes, common cat snake, common kukri snake, common bronzeback tree snake, annulated sea snake, common wolf snake, common vine snake, striped keelback, checkered keelback, olive keelback, common trinket snake, spectacled cobra, banded sea krait and hook-nosed sea snake. Crocodilian species include the gharial, marsh crocodile, saltwater crocodile, Siamese crocodile, African dwarf crocodile, Nile crocodile and spectacled caiman. Other reptiles at the park include water monitor, Bengal monitor, Indian black turtle, Indian flapshell turtle, Indian star tortoise, spotted rock gecko and South Asian chamaeleon. The snakes are housed in glass-fronted enclosures and the crocodilians and the larger lizards are housed in open-air enclosures protected by parapet walls and wire mesh. The park also has an aquarium for water snakes and turtles. All the enclosures have signages giving information in English and Tamil.

On 16 January 2010, the country's first-of-its-kind Digital Infotainment–based visitors interpretation centre with static and electronically aided moving mode displays with information on snakes in English and Tamil, using six 32" LCD screens, was opened for public.

There is a small auditorium with a ceiling-mounted projector, wall-mounted screen and a touch-screen kiosk for conducting classes for visiting students. There are also facilities for projecting from the kiosk to the wall-mounted screen. The park has a museum of preserved specimens of reptiles and amphibians and a library with a stock of books and journals on reptiles and related subjects. The park also demonstrates venom extraction from snakes. From May 1976, the centre publishes a journal named Hamadryad on reptiles and amphibians, renamed as Cobra since 1990. Originally a quarterly, the journal was made a half-yearly since January 2010. The centre also publishes various books on the subject.

The centre remains closed on Tuesdays.

== Captive breeding ==
The park, along with the Arignar Anna Zoological Park, Madras Crocodile Bank and the Mysore Zoo, is slated to become a nodal point for captive breeding of endangered pythons in the country, especially the Indian rock python (Python molurus) and reticulated python (Python reticulatus). The park also breeds mugger crocodiles.

The park is one of the participating zoos approved by the Central Zoo Authority for the conservation of rock python.

== Research ==
In 2008–10, the park's research lab implemented a research for developing a snake repellent to protect army personnel from snakes commonly found in desert regions. This is being funded by a Defence Research and Development Organisation (DRDO) grant of ₹ 900,000.

In September 2010, the Trust sanctioned a 5-year survey of the herpetofauna of the Eastern Ghats. The park also undertakes reptile surveys in various other parts of the state.

== Other activities ==
Initially, the process of extracting venom from snakes for pharmaceutical companies to prepare anti-venom drugs was undertaken by the park. However, after the government imposed a ban on selling snake skins, this task has been given to the Irulas Co-operative Society at the Madras Crocodile Bank Trust.

The park conducts various outreach programmes for schools in and around Chennai on snakes and other reptiles and their environment and one-day workshops for personnel of the forest department and fire and rescue services department to train them in identifying snakes, rescuing them from human habitations and translocating them to wild habitats. The park also conducts regular demonstrations and lectures on identification of some of the principal species of venomous and non-venomous snakes, the need to protect them, ways of preventing them from getting into human habitations and translocating them from such habitations, treatment of snakebite and so forth.

== Incidents ==
On 11 July 2009, eight sand boas (Eryx johnii) in the park were stolen from their enclosures located close to the quarantine block and the staff quarters. The theft occurred in the night and was noticed the next morning. Incidentally, three sand boas were stolen from their enclosure at the Arignar Anna Zoological Park the previous night. However, two were recovered 3 days later, after they were found hiding in the premises.

== See also ==
- Arignar Anna Zoological Park
- Birding in Chennai
- Guindy National Park
- List of zoos in India
- Madras Crocodile Bank Trust
- Marine Kingdom
- Parks in Chennai
- Pulicat Lake Bird Sanctuary
