= Madras Crocodile Bank Trust =

Herpetology research station in Chennai, India

Coordinates: 12.743875°N 80.240107°E

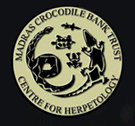

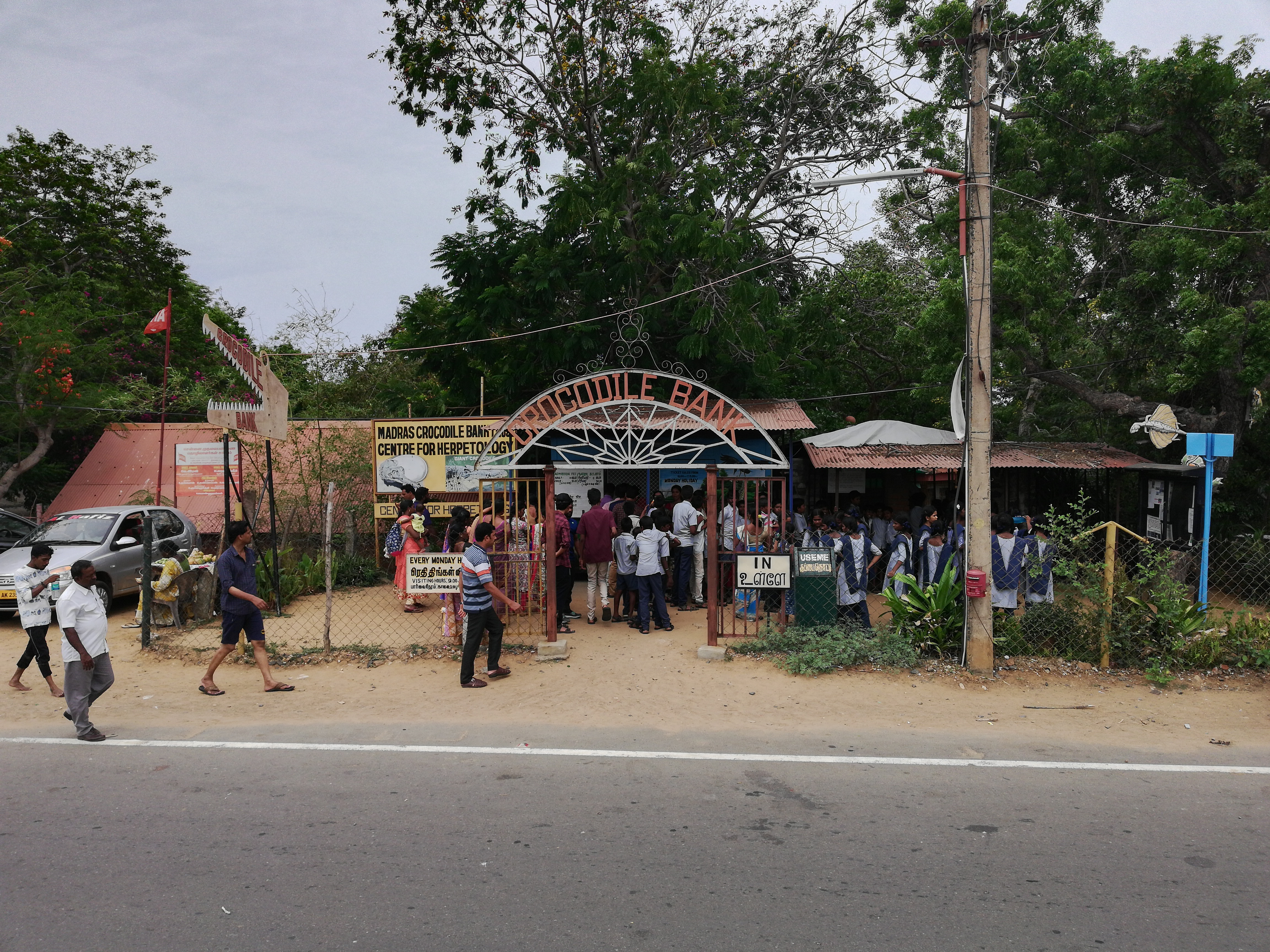
- Entrance to the Madras Crocodile Bank
- Abbreviation: CrocBank
- Formation: 1976
- Type: NGO
- Legal status: Non profit public trust
- Purpose: Herpetofaunal conservation, research and education
- Headquarters: Chennai
- Location: Vadanemmeli, Chennai
- Region served: India
- Official language: Tamil, English
- Founder and director: Romulus Whitaker
- Affiliations: Central Zoo Authority of India; IUCN Species Survival Commission
- Staff: 49
- Website: www.madrascrocodilebank.org

The Madras Crocodile Bank Trust and Centre for Herpetology (MCBT) is a reptile zoo and herpetology research station, located 40 km (25 mi) south of the city of Chennai, Tamil Nadu, India. The centre is both a registered trust and a recognized zoo under the Wild Life (Protection) Act, 1972 and comes under the purview of the Central Zoo Authority, Ministry of Environment, Forest and Climate Change, Government of India. The establishment is located on a 8.5 acres (3.4 ha) site covered by coastal sand forests, along the coast of Bay of Bengal.

The MCBT was established in 1976 with the primary aim of conservation of three Indian species of crocodiles — mugger crocodile, saltwater crocodile and gharial. It was expanded as a centre for herpetology and research of other reptile species in 2003. The centre has bred over 5000 crocodiles since its inception and is one of the largest reptile zoos in the world. As of 2024, the park had 15 species of crocodiles including three critically endangered species and 33 other reptilian species. The park recorded about 0.42 million annual visitors from April 2018 to March 2019.

The trust also runs three field stations at South Andaman, Agumbe in Karnataka, and the Chambal valley in Uttar Pradesh as well as a snake venom extraction centre. It is also involved in various research, conservation and educational projects.

== History ==
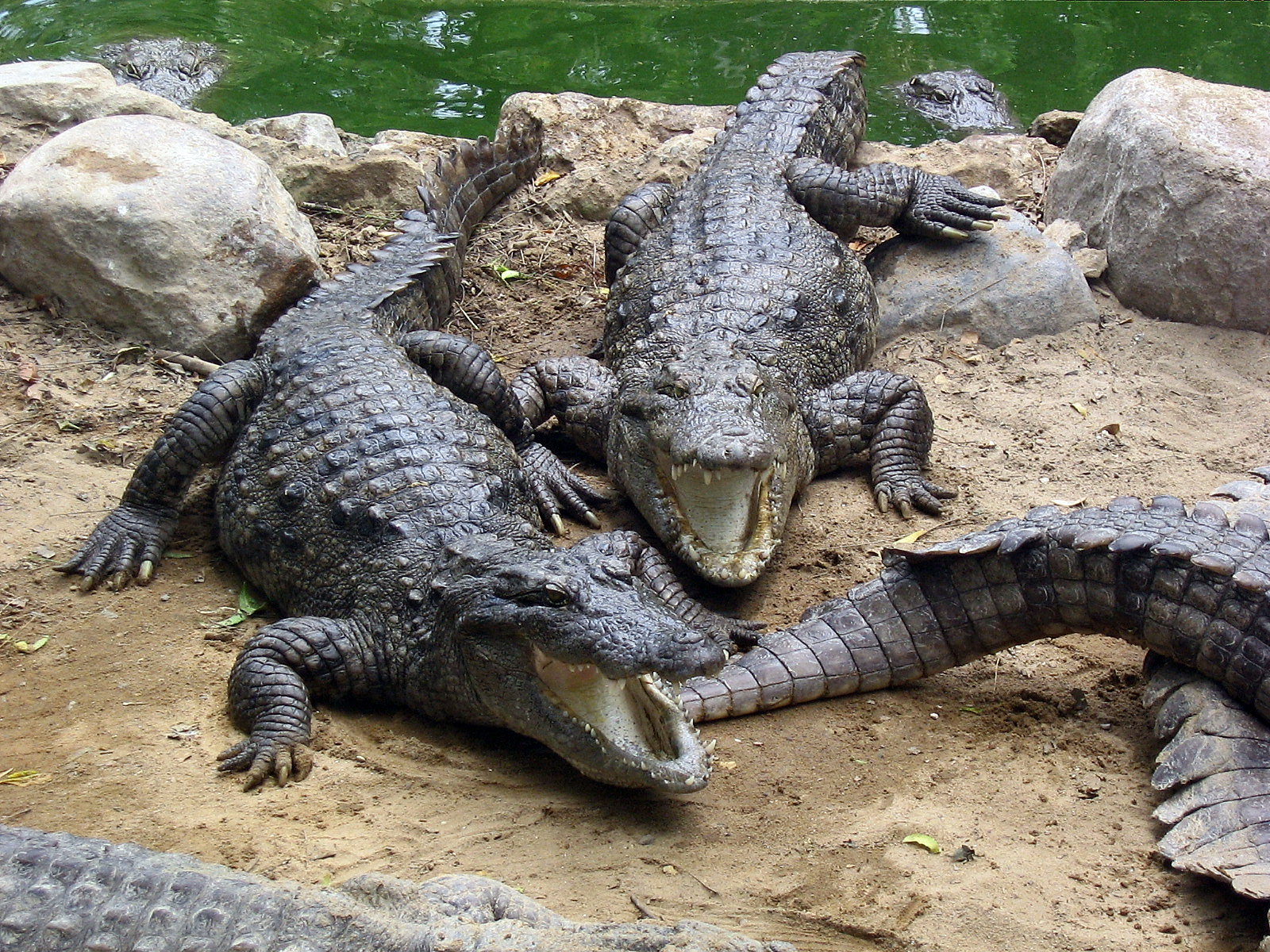
The trust was started to save Indian crocodiles including the pictured marsh crocodiles

Towards the end of the 19th century, hunting of crocodiles for their skin began and by the 1960s, wild populations of the crocodiles were reducing. Amongst the three Indian species, the mugger (Crocodylus palustris) had disappeared from most of its range, the gharial (Gavialis gangeticus) was critically endangered and saltwater crocodile (Crocodylus porosus) numbers were threatened. The crocodile species were protected under the Wild Life (Protection) Act, 1972 by the Government of India. The Crocodile Conservation Project was launched by the Indian government in collaboration with the United Nations Development Programme (UNDP) and the Food and Agriculture Organization (FAO) in 1975, for the protection and captive breeding of crocodiles. The Madras Crocodile Bank was conceived in 1973 and it was established on 26 August 1976 by herpetologist Romulus Whitaker with his wife Zai Whitaker and others. The bank was started for the protection and breeding of Indian crocodile species.

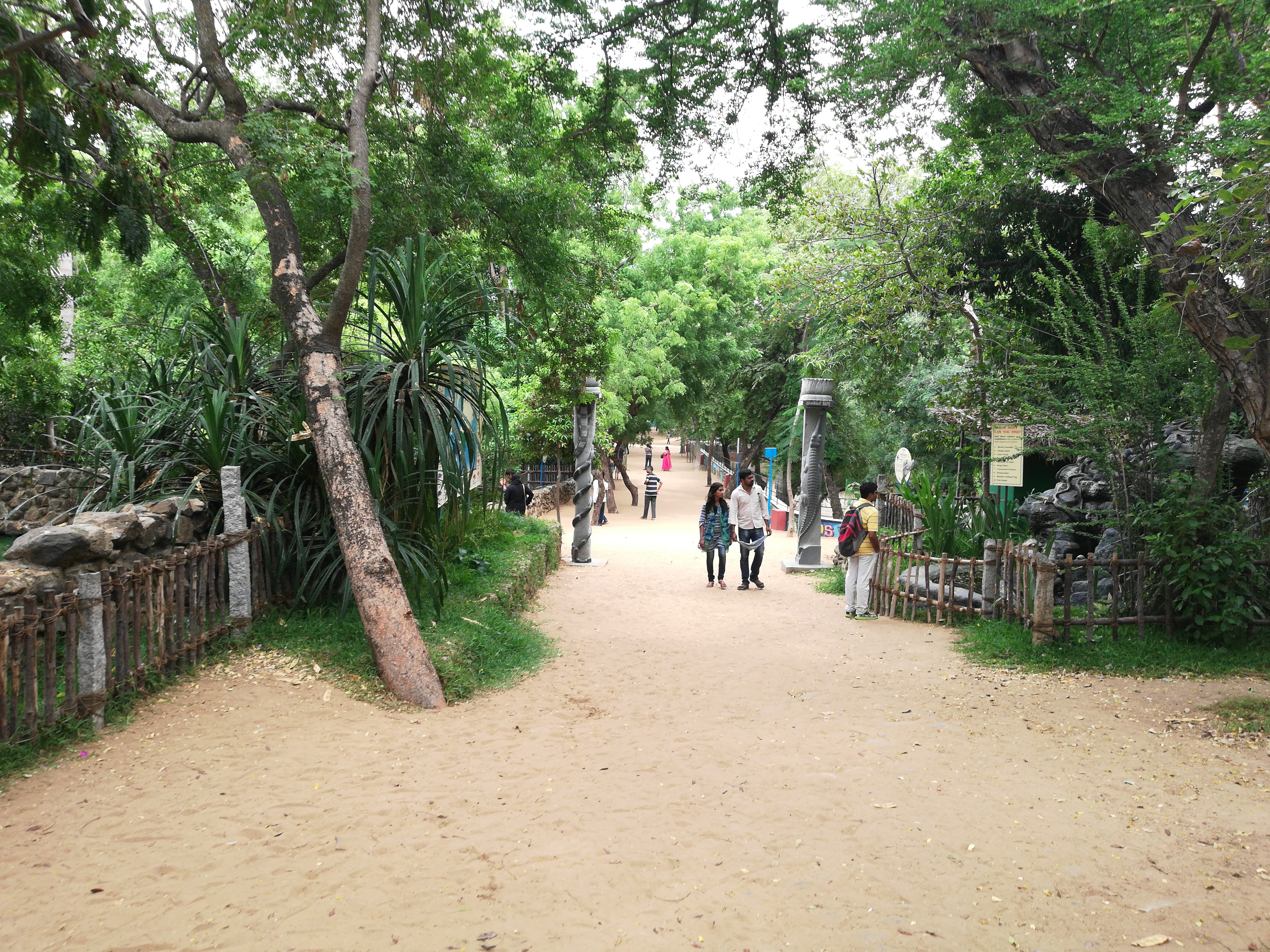
The bank is situated on the sandy coast, along the Bay of Bengal

The Crocodile Bank later developed a captive breeding program for freshwater turtles and tortoises. In the 1980s, the bank was established on the Moyar River to study the mugger crocodiles. In 1990, the Andaman and Nicobar Environmental Team (ANET) was set up as a division of the bank with a station established on a 5 acres (2.0 ha) stretch of land in Wandoor, on the southern tip of South Andaman in 1993. The newsletter Hamadryad being published by the trust since 1976 was converted into a full scientific journal in 1991. In 2003, the bank was renamed the Madras Crocodile Bank Trust and Center for Herpetology and additional exhibits of other reptiles were added. The trust is also involved in research on snake venom and in 2005, the Agumbe Rainforest Research Station was established in Agumbe in Karnataka for the study of King Cobra and other diverse animals and ecosystems of the Western Ghats. In 2005, Rom Whitaker was given a Whitley Award and used the money to assist in setting up the Agumbe station.

In 2011, the Crocodile Bank announced plans for the construction of a new frontage and satellite facility, followed by the redesign and construction of the display area including new enclosures with glass facades, walkways and interactive features. As per the new plan, estimated at ₹100 million (US$1.1 million), the park would be divided into four areas corresponding to various geographies with thematic landscaping, interactive displays and signage. The plan included a separate gharial exhibit, entry plaza with a café, parking areas and an interpretation centre that houses small crocodiles, snakes, turtles and lizards on the upper level and underwater viewing of the largest saltwater crocodile exhibit in the park, on the lower level. In 2018, Whitaker was presented with Padma Shri, the fourth highest civilian award by the Government of India. In 2020, the trust faced financial problems due to COVID-19 pandemic induced lockdown. The trust raised funds through crowd funding to mitigate the situation and for further planned developments.

== Organisation ==
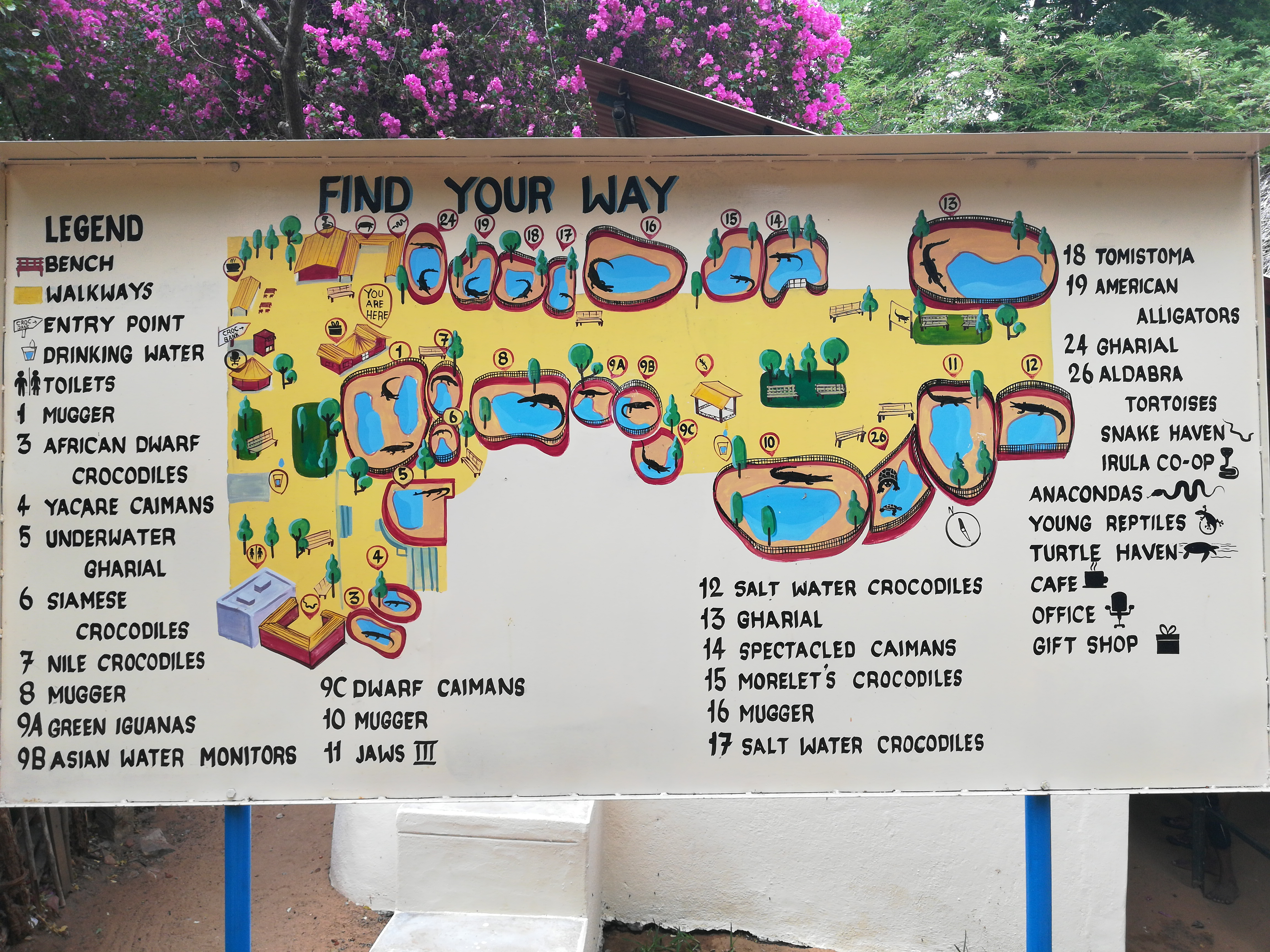
Map of the reptile zoo run by the Trust

The Madras Crocodile Bank Trust was established in 1976 which runs a reptile zoo and herpetology research station. The centre is both a registered trust and a recognized zoo under the Wild Life (Protection) Act, 1972 and comes under the purview of the Central Zoo Authority, Ministry of Environment, Forest and Climate Change, Government of India. The Crocodile Bank is situated on a 8.5 acres (3.4 ha) stretch of land, located about 40 km (25 mi) south of Chennai on the East Coast Road at Vadanemmeli near Thiruvidandhai, along the Bay of Bengal.

The bank runs three field bases namely Andaman and Nicobar Environmental Team at South Andaman, Agumbe Rainforest Research Station at Agumbe and Gharial Ecology Project in Chambal valley. The trust is affiliated with more than 47 institutions including The World Conservation Union (IUCN), World Wide Fund for Nature (WWF), Marine Conservation Society and Smithsonian Institution. The trust manages a snake venom extraction center, operated by the Irula tribes.

== Wildlife conservation ==
=== Animal research and education ===
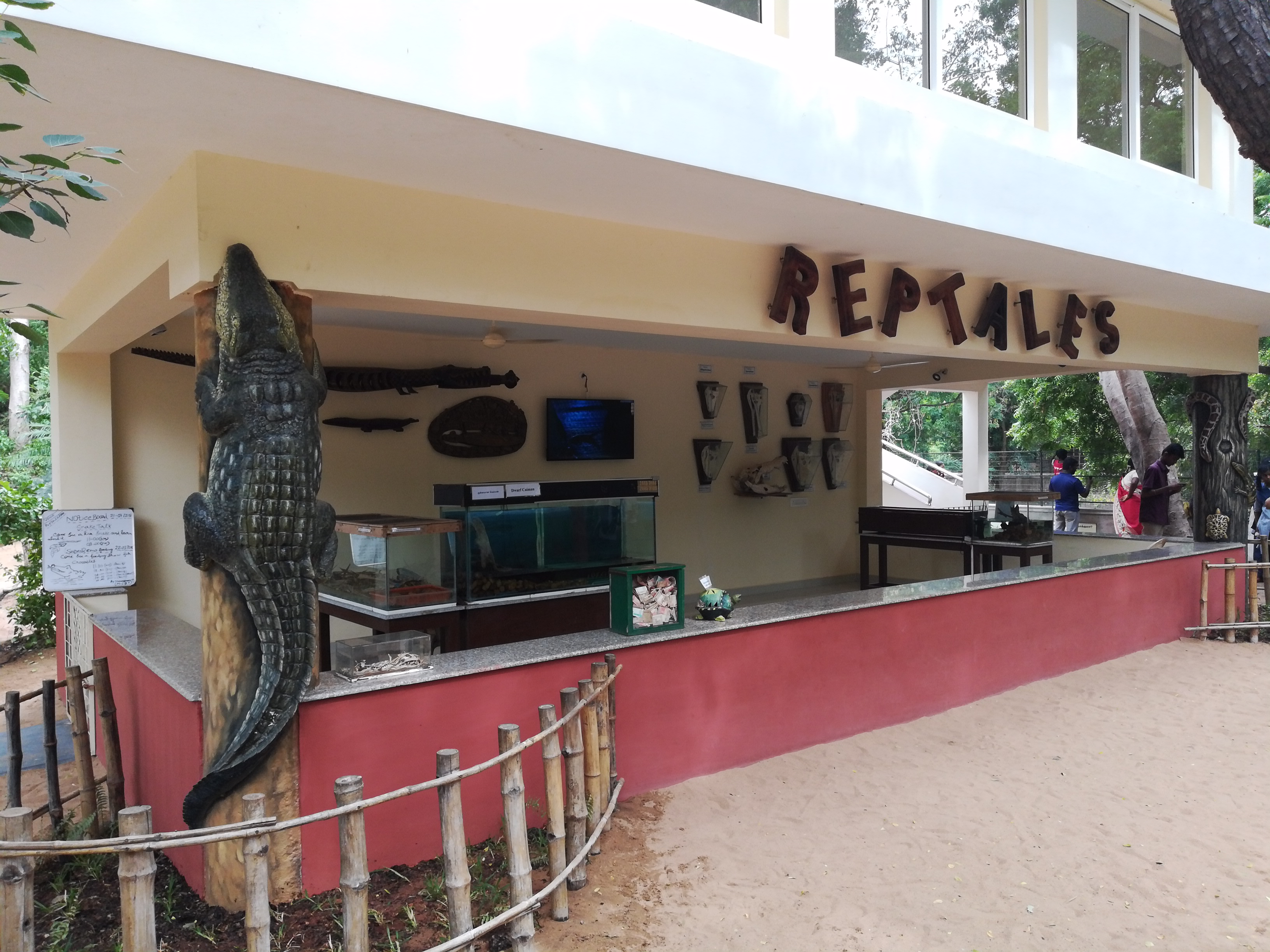
Public demonstration and education center at the park

The trust engages in research projects on reptiles and other educational programmes. The bank has served as a regional source of status information for the World Conservation Monitoring Centre and has hosted numerous international meetings of the IUCN Specialist Groups dealing with reptiles. The trust publishes a biannual herpetology journal called Hamadryad and is home to the largest library of herpetological literature in India. Research in the field of herpetology within the bank has resulted in over 600 scientific publications, books, reports, newspaper and magazine articles and films.

The centre has hosted numerous local and international scientists and research specialists. In the early 1980s, Edward Moll of Eastern Illinois University did a study on turtles in India based out of the bank. The bank's research biologists have since studied freshwater turtles in the Chambal River in Uttar Pradesh on a WWF grant with many species kept in the park as part of the centre's ongoing research program. The bank collaborated with J.W. Lang from University of North Dakota, to initiate a project for the study mugger crocodiles. The project was done in association with Romulus Whitaker and Harry Andrews and focused on reptile reproduction, egg incubation, and temperature-dependent sex determination. In the 1990s, studies on breeding biology and growth of lizards was conducted.

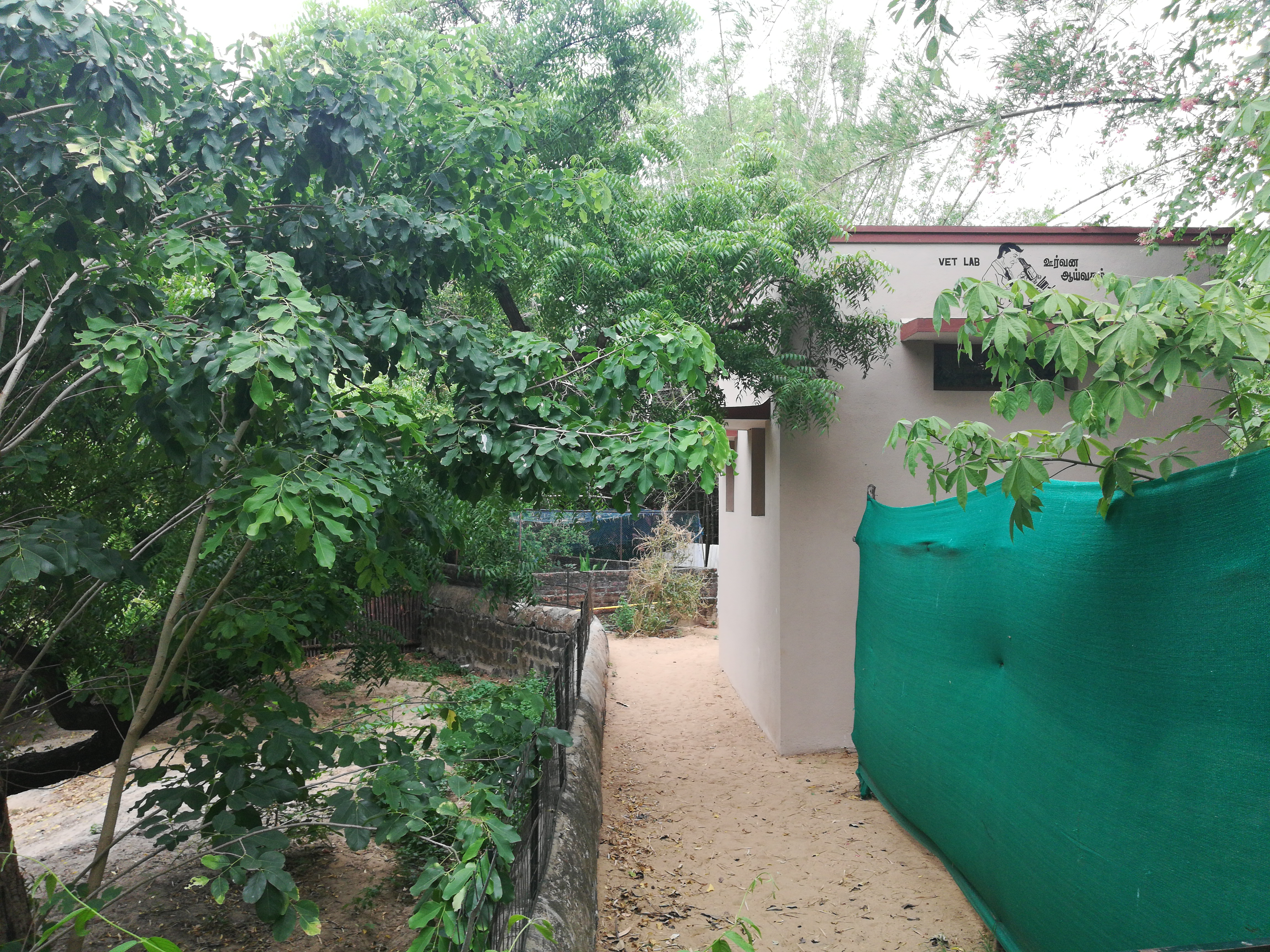
Veterinary laboratory at the park

In 2001, the Crocodile Bank was awarded the Ford Conservation and Environmental Grant for project "Integrated Environment Education", a multi-lingual programme on reptile preservation to create environmental awareness. The Andaman and Nicobar Islands Environmental Team is focused on research and conservation of the bio-diversity in Andaman and Nicobar islands. The park conducts research into snake venom and mitigation of its effects in humans. The Agumbe research centre aids in study of venomous snakes and other organisms in the Western Ghats. The park conducts regular educational and outreach programmes. The bank serves as a consultant on reptile management and conservation issues to multiple organisations and countries. The bank also runs an animal-adoption programme under which patrons can sponsor an animal housed at the center.

The Crocodile Bank has a veterinary care section which works with the maintenance staff to monitor the health and maintenance of the animals. Examination and treatment for various pathological and parasitical examinations are carried out on the animals. Unique identification numbers are assigned to individual animals with maintenance of health and medical records. The trust also engages in training of veterinarians to help equip other research and conservation projects.

=== Captive breeding ===
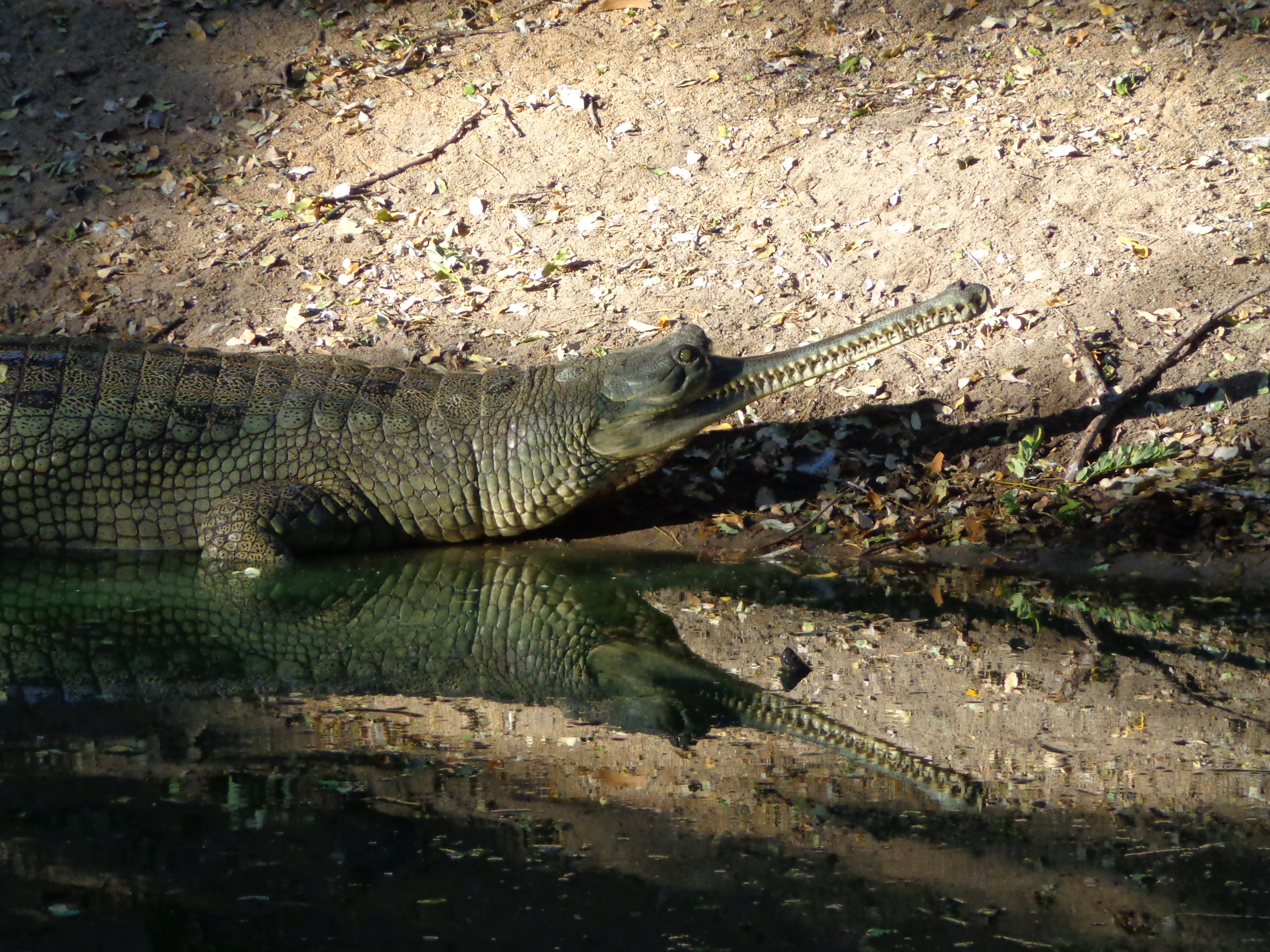
The park has been breeding critically endangered gharials since 1989

The trust was established for breeding crocodiles, has bred over 5000 crocodiles and is the largest breeding centre in India. The park is one of the centres for breeding the critically endangered gharials and has been successfully breeding the species since 1989. The park breeds other two species of crocodiles from India, mugger and salt-water crocodiles from 1983. It has also been breeding other exotic crocodile species such as Morelet's crocodile (Crocodylus moreletii) and Siamese crocodile (Crocodylus siamensis). In 2010, the bank also bred the rare false gharial, a species listed as endangered on the Red List of the International Union for Conservation of Nature (IUCN). The trust has been involved in re-introducing crocodiles to the wild and various zoo exchange programmes. The government stopped the release of captive bred crocodiles into the wild in 1994, which led to the number of crocodiles increasing at the park. As no methods have been evolved to sterilize the crocodiles, the increasing numbers resulted in nearly one thousand animals being relocated to Gujarat in 2022.

The bank also breeds turtles, snakes and other reptiles. It is a coordinating zoo of the Central Zoo Authority of India for the breeding programmes for endangered species, including rock python, king cobra and Ganges softshell turtle, as per the National Zoo Policy adopted by the Government of India in 1988. It has been breeding cane turtle (Vijayachelys silvatica) and Travancore tortoise (Indotestudo travancorica) since the 1980s. In May 2004, the bank successfully bred one of the world's most critically endangered turtles, the red-crowned roofed turtle (Batagur kachuga), for the first time ever in captivity. Some of the turtles were sent to Uttar Pradesh to be introduced into the wild. The trust has been involved in engaging local community and education for the conservation of olive ridley sea turtle (Lepidochelys olivacea). The Crocodile Bank is a nodal point for captive breeding of endangered pythons in the country, especially the Indian rock python (Python molurus) and reticulated python (Python reticulatus).

The park is home to the few approved snake venom extraction centres in India, the Irula Snake Catchers' Industrial Cooperative Society, which also conducts venom extraction shows for the public at its snake farm. The cooperative society was officially registered on 19 December 1978, and venom extraction was started on 16 December 1982. Started with 26 members, the membership of the society rose to 350 by 2001. As of 2022, it is the largest venom-producing center in India, contributing to 80% of the venom extracted.

== Exhibition ==
The bank hosts one of the largest reptilian zoos in the world. As of 2024, the park had 15 species of crocodiles including three critically endangered species and 33 other reptilian species. The park is divided into four areas corresponding to various geographies namely, Asia, Americas, Amazon and Africa, with thematic landscaping and signage. Apart from the crocodiles, there are various snakes including pythons, anacondas and boas, turtles and tortoises including Aldabra giant tortoises, lizards and piranhas. Four Komodo dragons have been acquired from Bronx Zoo in New York. The bank also functions as a natural shelter for a variety of birds, enabling bird-watching. The bank also operates a night safari on weekends.

Breakdown of exhibited species

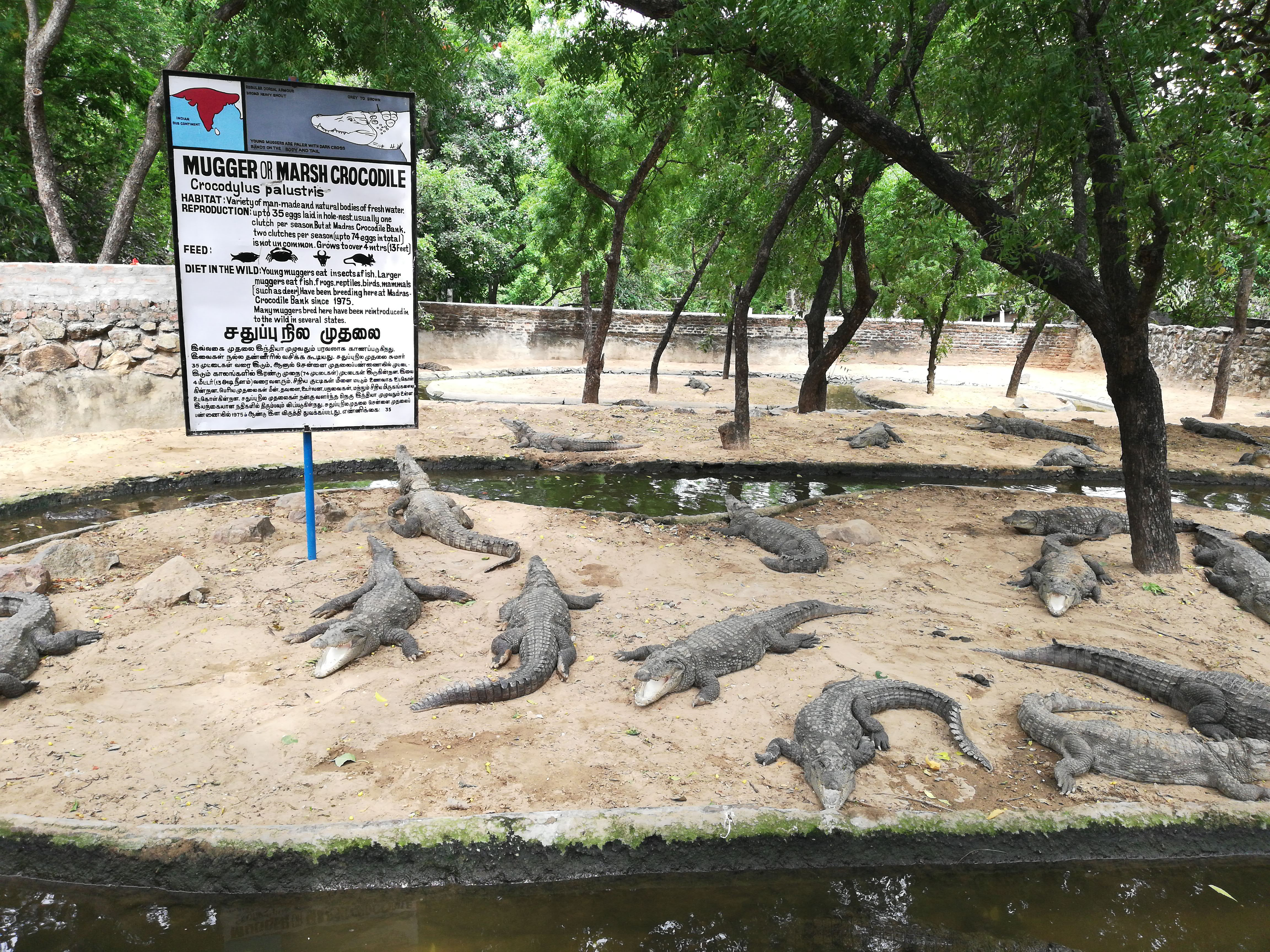
Marsh crocodiles enclosure at the park

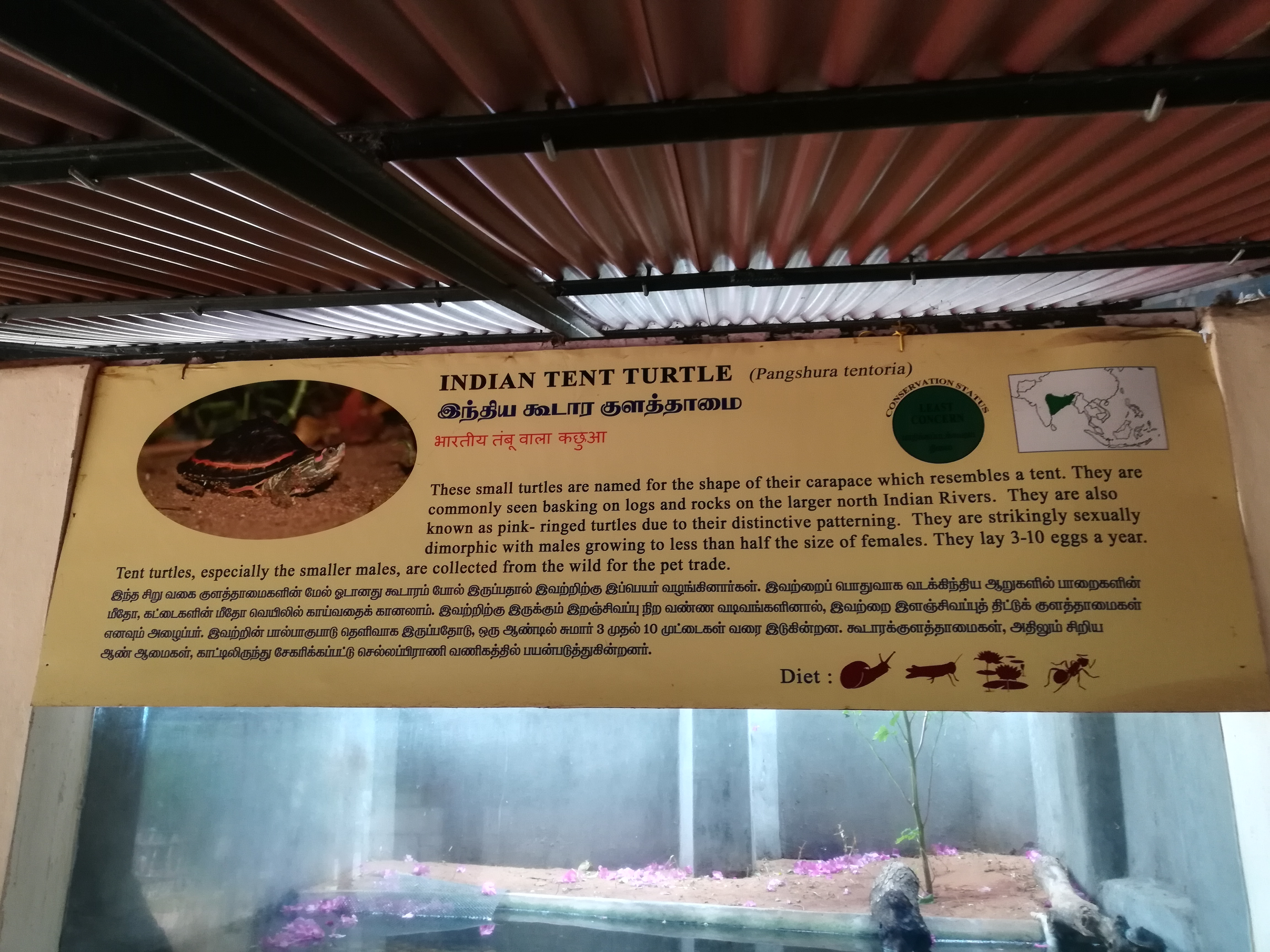
Information boards like this one provide detailed descriptions about the specimens on display

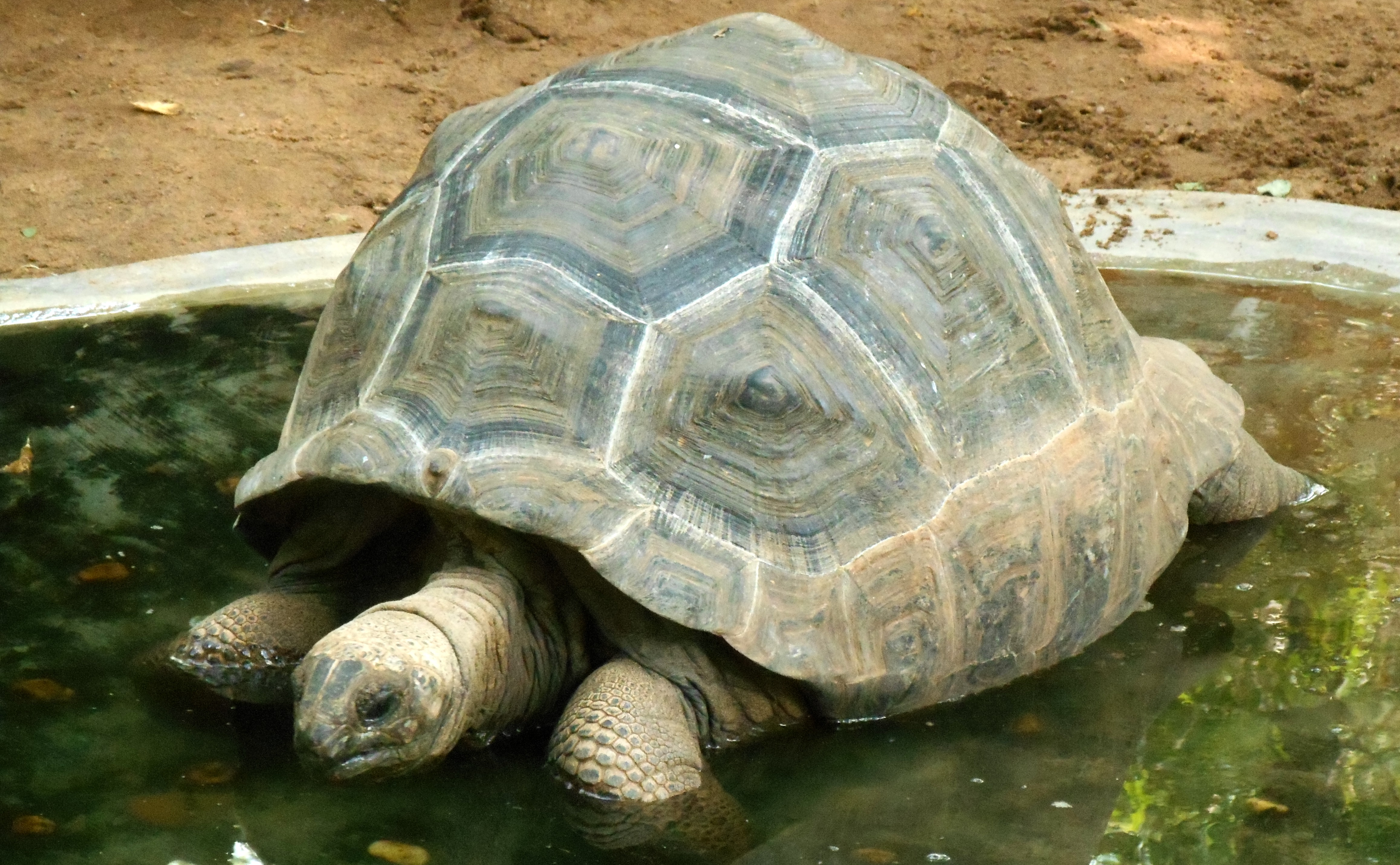
An Aldabra giant tortoise at the park

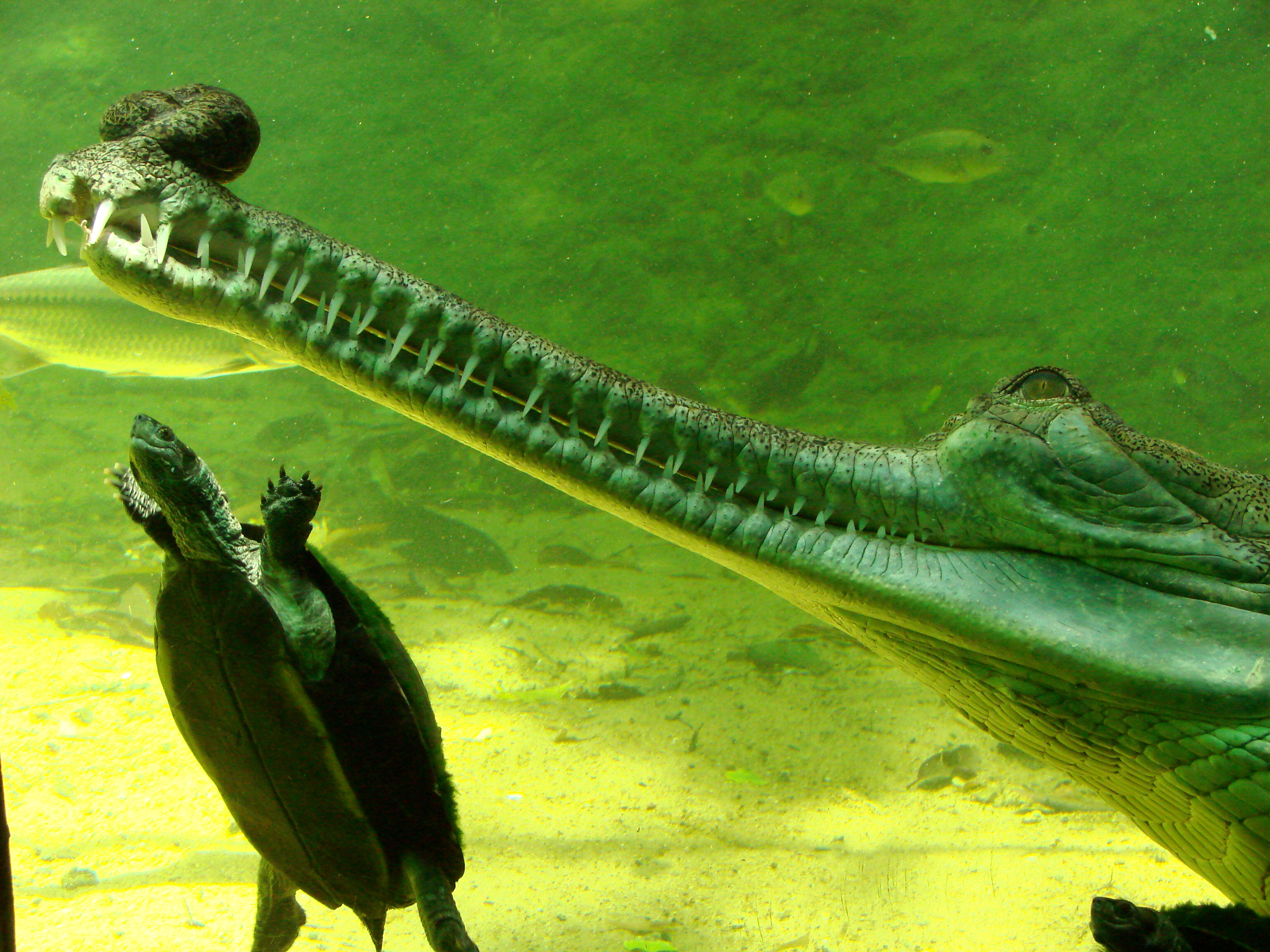
Close-up view of an underwater exhibit at the park

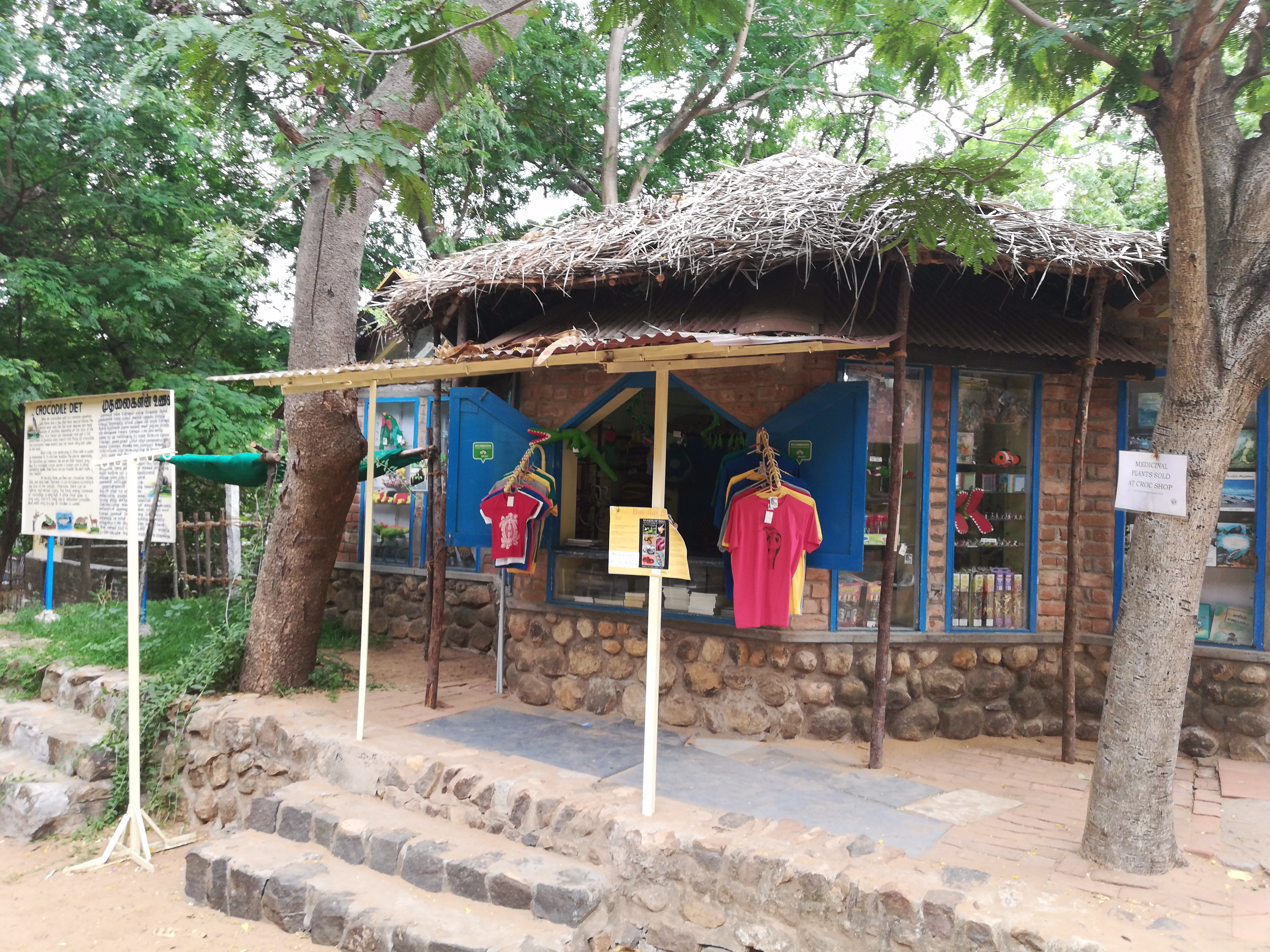
Shops selling reptile memorabilia within the zoo campus

Reptile stock at the Crocodile Bank as on 1 April 2011 is as follows:

| Common name (species) | Total |
|---|---|
| Crocodilians | |
| Marsh or Mugger crocodile (Crocodylus palustris) | 2115 |
| Saltwater crocodile (Crocodylus porosus) | 12 |
| Gharial (Gavialis gangeticus) | 55 |
| Common caiman (Caiman crocodylus) | 56 |
| Yacare caiman (Caiman yacare) | 3 |
| Dwarf caiman (Paleosuchus palpebrosus) | 13 |
| American alligator (Alligator mississippiensis) | 2 |
| Siamese crocodile (Crocodylus siamensis) | 9 |
| Nile crocodile (Crocodylus niloticus) | 7 |
| African slender-snouted crocodile (Mecistops cataphractus) | 6 |
| Dwarf crocodile (Osteolaemus tetraspis) | 3 |
| Morelet's crocodile (Crocodylus moreletti) | 13 |
| False gharial (Tomistoma schlegelii) | 2 |
| Freshwater crocodile (Crocodylus johnstoni) | 1 |
| Total | 2302 |
| Freshwater turtles | |
| Indian softshell turtle (Nilssonia gangetica) | 9 |
| Indian flapshell turtle (Lissemys punctata) | 13 |
| Northern river terrapin (Batagur baska) | 2 |
| Red-crowned roofed turtle (Batagur kachuga) | 72 |
| Indian roofed turtle (Pangshura tecta) | 2 |
| Indian roofed turtle (Pangshura tecta circumdata) | 17 |
| Brahminy river turtle (Hardella thurjii) | 2 |
| Indian star tortoise (Geochelone elegans) | 8 |
| Travancore tortoise (Indotestudo travancorica) | 23 |
| Aldabra giant tortoise (Aldabrachelys gigantea) | 4 |
| Indian tent turtle or Pink Ringed Turtle (Pangshura tentoria) | 1 |
| Total | 152 |
| Snakes | |
| Indian rock python (Python molurus) | 26 |
| Reticulated python (Python reticulatus) | 1 |
| Indian cobra (Albino) (Naja naja) | 1 |
| Green anaconda (Eunectes murinus) | 1 |
| Whitakers sand boa (Eryx whitakerii) | 1 |
| Total | 30 |
| Lizards | |
| Northern caiman lizard (Dracena guanensis) | 1 |
| Komodo dragon (Varanus komodoensis) | 4 |
| Iguana | 2 |
| Total | 7 |
| Total specimens | 2491 |

== Financials and patronage ==
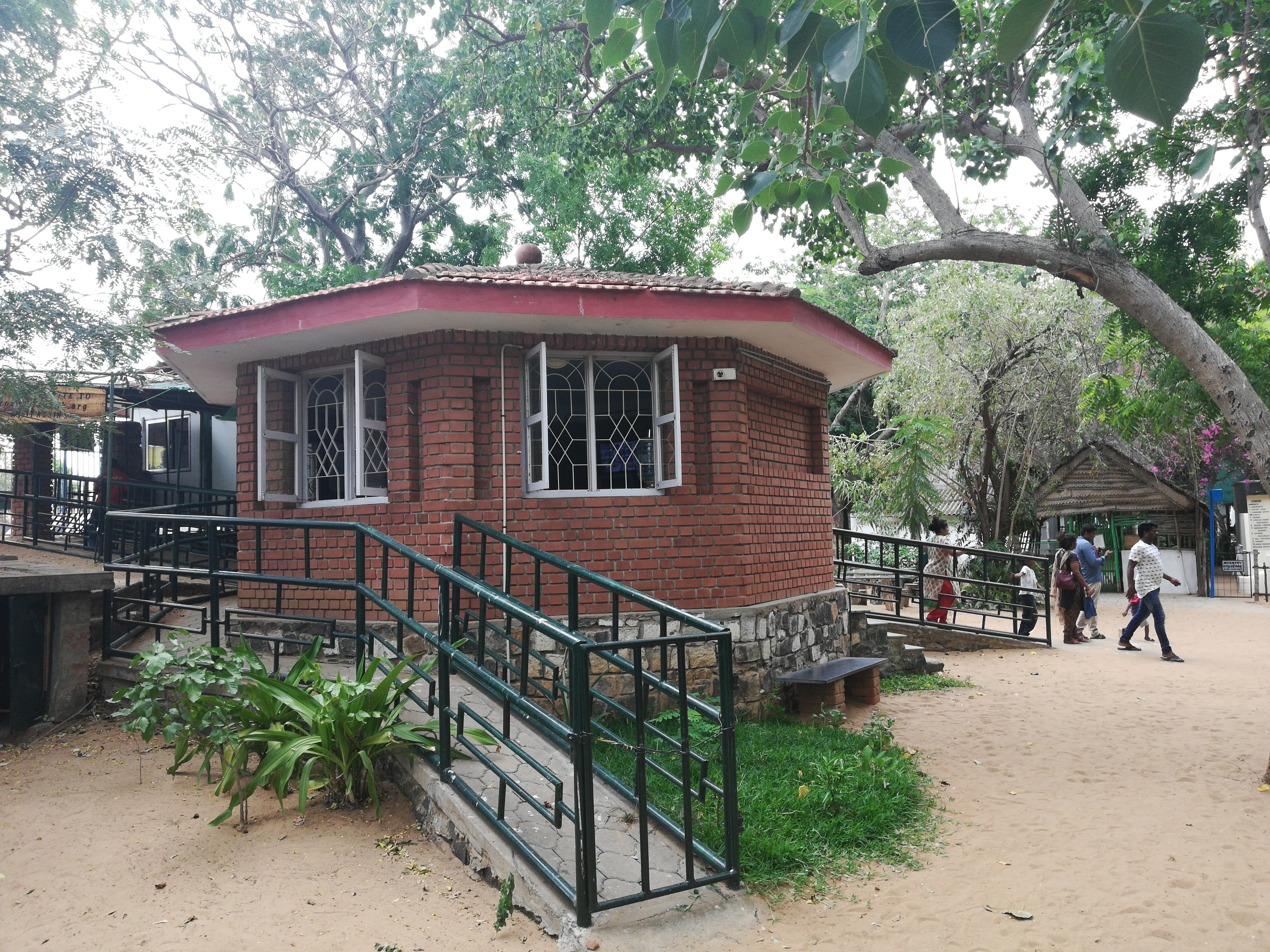
Office of the zoo manager

As of 2021-22, the trust declared revenues of ₹4.22 crore (US$450,000) against an expenditure of ₹5.26 crore (US$560,000). The trust gets about one-third of revenues from ticketing at the zoo with other income coming through research grants (23%), donations (12%), educational programmes (11%) among others. The trust spends 30% of the expenditure on wages followed by 23% for research. Other major costs include interest on capital and reptile feeding. The park recorded about 0.42 million annual visitors from April 2018 to March 2019. Post opening of the park after the Covid-induced lockdown, about 0.15 million visitors were recorded from September 2021 to March 2022 with an average monthly footfall of 21,400.

== See also ==
- Arignar Anna Zoological Park
- Chennai Snake Park Trust
- Guindy National Park
- Marine Kingdom
