= Guindy =

Neighborhood of Chennai, India

Guindy கிண்டி
- Neighbourhood
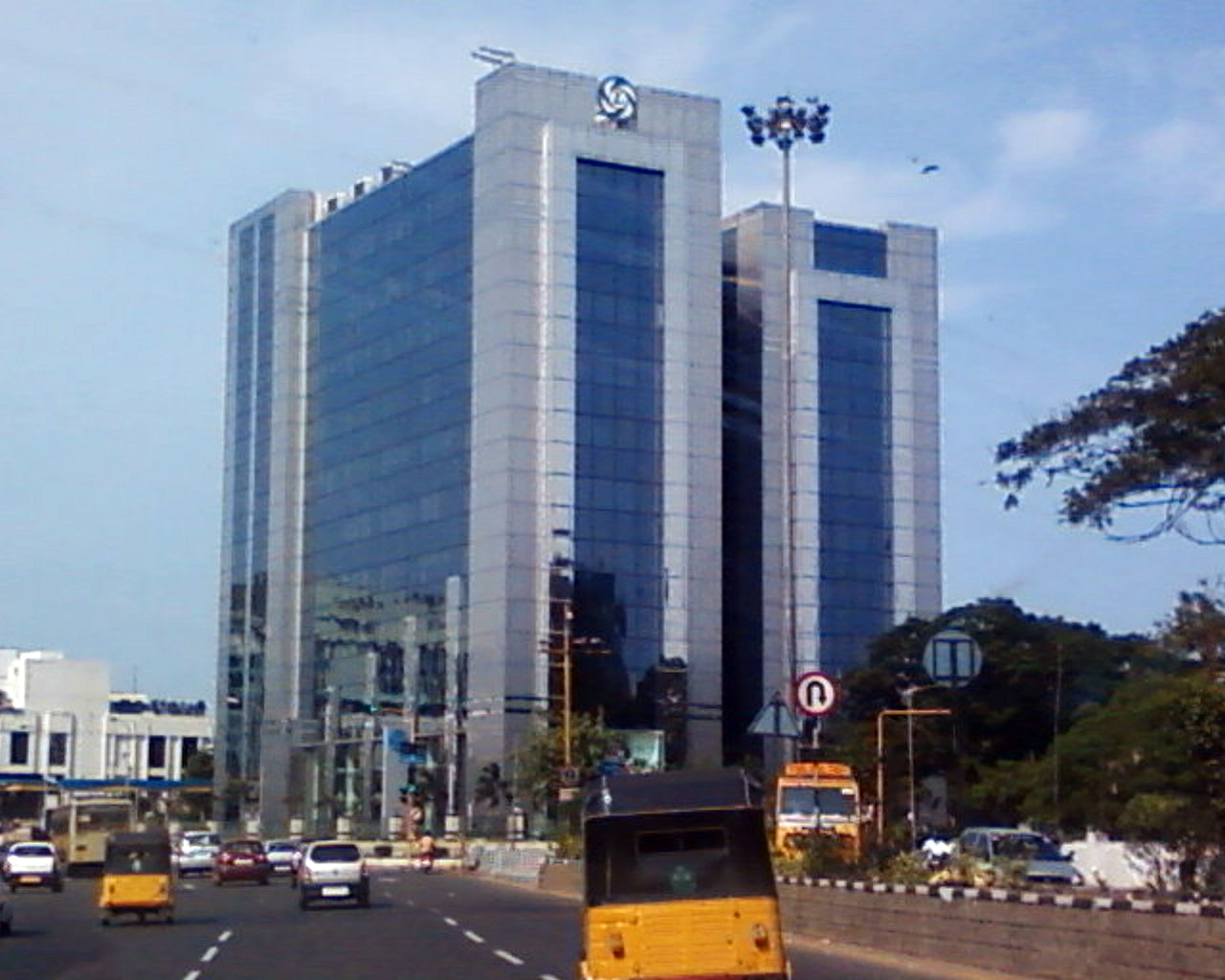
- Ashok Leyland Corporate Headquarter in Guindy, Chennai
- Nickname: Gateway to Chennai
- Guindy, Tamil Nadu Guindy (Tamil Nadu) Guindy (India)
- Coordinates: 13.006700°N 80.220600°E
- Country: India
- State: Tamil Nadu
- District: Chennai
- Metro: Chennai

Government
  - Body: Chennai Corporation

Area
  - Total: 7.88 km^{2} (3.04 sq mi)
- Elevation: 37 m (121 ft)

Languages
  - Official: Tamil
- Time zone: UTC+5:30 (IST)
- PIN: 600032
- Vehicle registration: TN-09
- Lok Sabha constituency: Chennai South
- Planning agency: CMDA
- Civic agency: Chennai Corporation
- Website: www.chennai.tn.nic.in

Guindy (/ˈɡɪn.di/) is a neighborhood of Chennai, Tamil Nadu, home to many important landmarks in Chennai, the most well known being Guindy National Park.

A commercial hub, Guindy is home to the headquarters of Ashok Leyland, and also serves as a main hub for several small and medium scale industries, especially within the Guindy Thiru Vi Ka Estate. It is an important nodal point of road traffic in the Chennai metropolitan area. Transportation to and from the neighborhood is catered by the Guindy railway station and Guindy metro station.

== Etymology ==
The precise origin of the name is unclear. According to regional Hindu tradition, the sage Bhringi is said to have performed penance on the Parangimalai hill, before which he had to circumambulate the regions surrounding the hillock, considered an abode of Shiva. The place where he completed the circumambulation and left his kindi (vessel) before starting the journey to the hilltop is said to have been named as kiṇḍi, and later the region's name was anglicized as Guindy during the British Raj.

== Transportation ==
Guindy is well connected by road and train services. Many buses ply through Guindy and connect it to the rest of Chennai. The area is also connected by train with the Chennai Suburban Railway and Chennai Metro. Guindy is located approximately 10 km away from the Chennai International Airport.

== Government House and Guindy under the British Raj ==
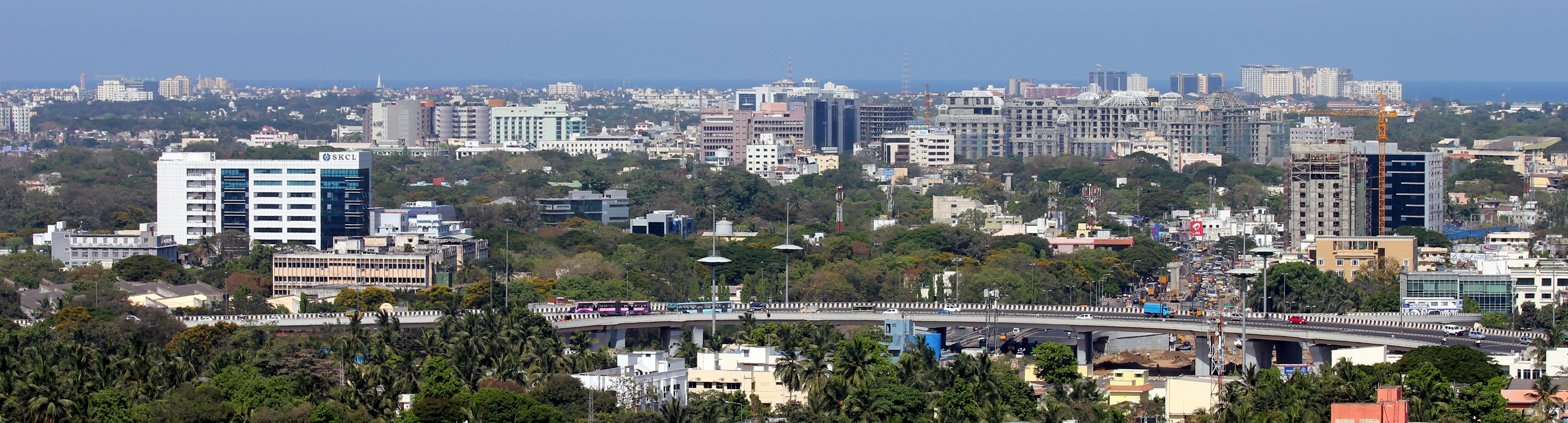
Guindy skyline

The governor lived in Government House, Fort St. George, a palatial residence with numerous servants, and had an official Daimler car at his disposal. For the governor's ceremonial use, there was a glittering coach with prancing horses, accompanied by a bodyguard of Indian troopers with red uniforms, glittering steel accoutrements and pennoned lances.

There was also Guindy, a spacious and elegant country home on the outskirts of Madras, surrounded by an extensive park. Nearby were a golf course, hockey pitches, riding stables and the Guindy Horse Racing Track. From May to October each year during the hot season, the Madras Government and its officials, the governor, and his family went to Government House in the hill station of Ootacamund in the Nilgiri hills.

== Important landmarks ==
- Guindy Race Course
- Guindy National Park
- Raj Bhavan, Chennai
- College of Engineering, Guindy
- Anna University Chennai
- Indian Institute of Technology, Madras
- Snake Park
- Cancer Research Institute
- Guindy Thiru Vi Ka Estate
- Guindy Links
