= Andaman Nicobar Environment Team =

The Andaman Nicobar Environment Team (ANET) field station is a multidisciplinary research and intervention facility focusing on environmental sustainability, located at North Wandoor, South Andaman, and the only research base of its kind in the Andaman and Nicobar Islands. With its mission to develop effective conservation strategies and community wellbeing based on a sound understanding of the islands' diverse social-ecological systems, ANET aims to contribute to resolving environmental and societal challenges in the islands through independent interventions, inter-organisational collaborations and the facilitation of engagements by organisations with similar visions and goals. ANET is owned and operated by Dakshin Foundation, Bangalore.

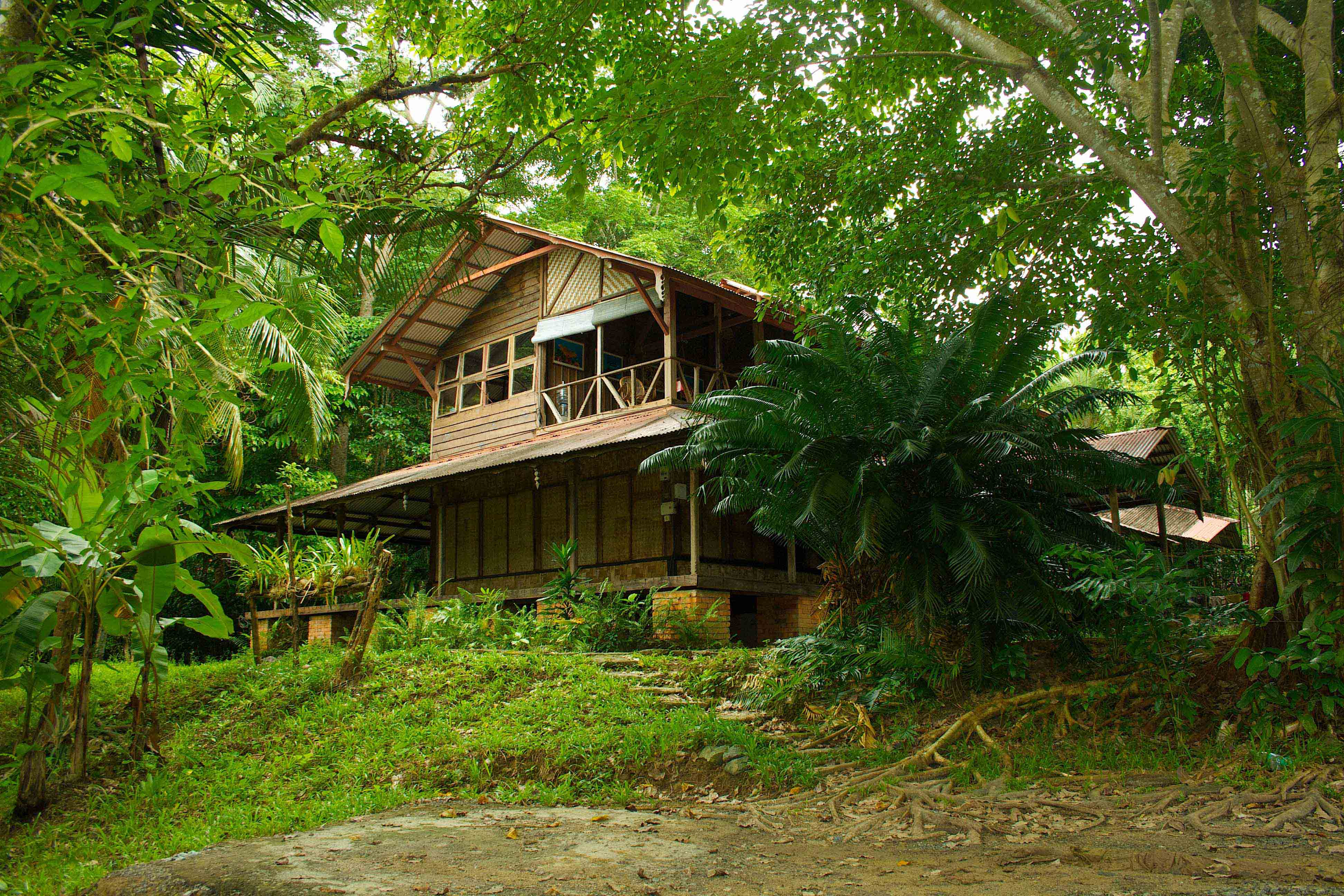
The ANET field station at Wandoor

== History ==
The idea of ANET was born out of a series of pioneering herpetological surveys carried out in the mid-1970s by Zahida (Zai) Whitaker and Romulus (Rom) Whitaker, and other members of the Madras Crocodile Bank. Although these surveys primarily targeted king cobras, sea turtles and crocodiles, the team also observed and documented a number of rising threats including unregulated hunting, logging and other forms of resource extraction in these islands. During their travels, they were also introduced to members of the Karen community, an ethnolinguistic minority from erstwhile Burma who were settled in the Webi village of Middle Andaman. The Karen became an integral part of ANET's field operations over the next few decades.

In the late 1980s, Rom and Zai Whitaker and Alok Mallick set up a research base in North Wandoor for herpetological and other ecological studies on islands. In 1990, the Andaman Nicobar Environment Team (ANET) was constituted, and with grants from Conservation International and the Royal Netherlands Embassy, 5 acres of land was purchased in 1993 at Wandoor on the southwestern tip of the South Andaman Island. With further grants, a base for conservation, research, and education was established and ANET began to host researchers from a number of ecological and social research institutions from the Indian mainland. Surveys and research studies were carried out on a wide range of topics in both the Andaman and Nicobar island groups.

The team grew under the leadership of Harry Andrews who brought together environmental researchers, educators, Karen and Ranchi community members. The field base itself was reforested with the foresight of ANET's initial architects such as Alok Mallick (who established the first local species nursery) and the able assistance of many employees including Manish Chandi, Saw John Aung Thong and Mrinal Kanti Bhowmik (Montu), who continue their associations with the base.

Following the 2004 Indian Ocean earthquake and tsunami, ANET's efforts were also directed at appropriate interventions such as donating locally manufactured dugouts (dungis), refabricating indigenous tools to carve traditional canoes, rebuilding houses based on traditional designs, etc. while slowly rebuilding its own research programmes. Post-2010, under the leadership of Tasneem Khan, ANET expanded its capacity to in-water research using SCUBA, including training and education.

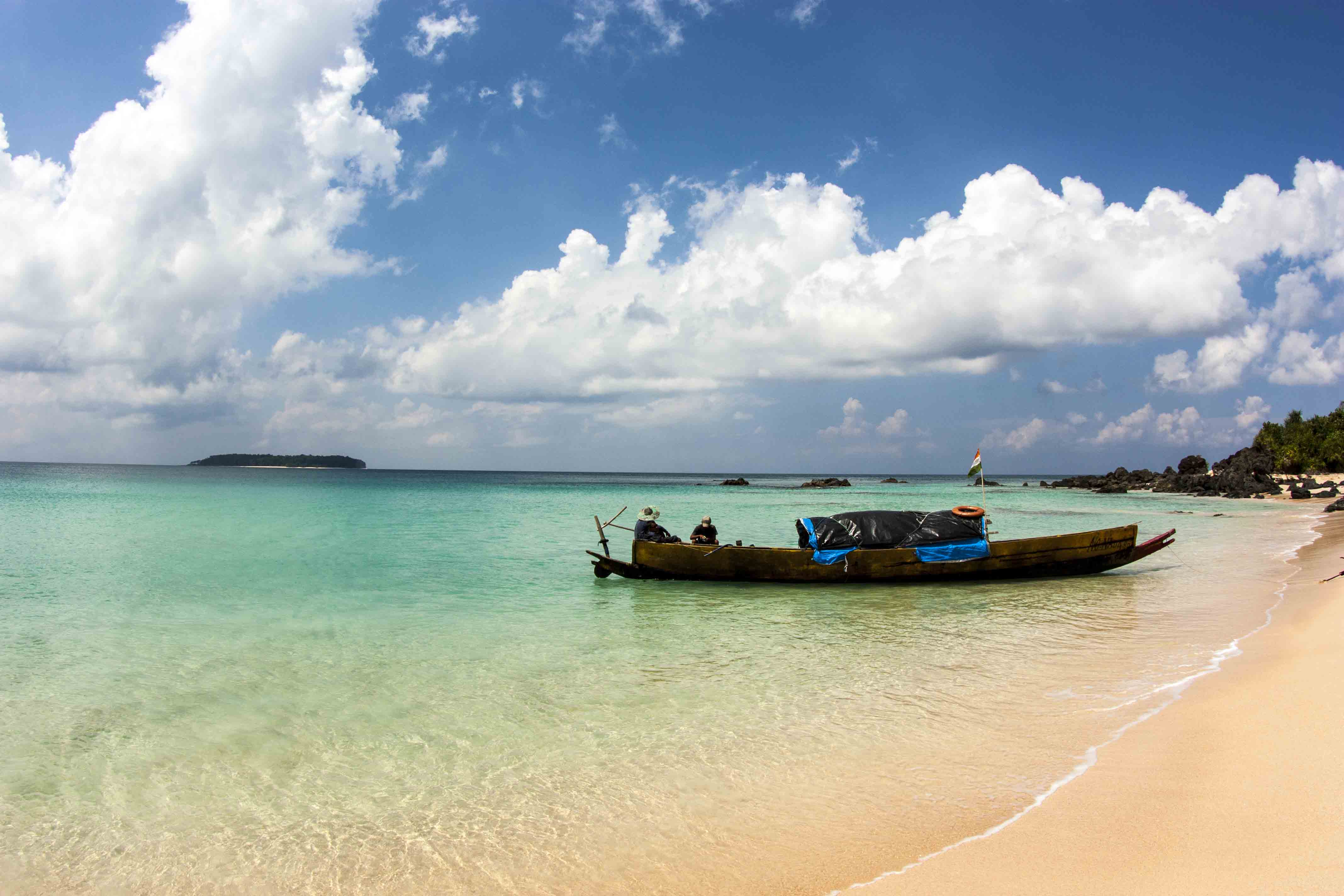
Surveys in the islands

In 2017, the MCBT entered a formal partnership with the Dakshin Foundation to manage ANET and to take forward its mission to contribute to conservation and sustainability in the islands. In July 2019, with financial support from Rohini Nilekani Philanthropies, Dakshin purchased ANET from MCBT. Currently, ANET functions under the supervision of the Board of Trustees of Dakshin Foundation, and is also guided by various advisory bodies on governance, research priorities and ethics.

== Research and operations ==
ANET proposes to address environmental challenges in the islands through independent research and intervention projects, inter-organisational collaborations and the facilitation of engagements by organisations with similar visions and goals.

As an interdisciplinary research centre, ANET carries out primary research that aims to fill data gaps and contribute knowledge pertinent to these islands that is vital for environmental preservation, sustainable development and conservation decision-making. Over the years, researchers employed by and based at ANET have carried out or facilitated a large number of surveys and ecological studies on various ecosystems including rainforests, coral reefs and seagrass beds, mangroves and intertidal systems; and species including herpetofauna such as saltwater crocodiles, snakes, marine turtles, etc.; mammals such as dugong, crab-eating macaques, bats and treeshrews; and species of fisheries significance such as groupers, sharks and rays. Currently, ANET's longest-running research project is Dakshin's leatherback turtle monitoring project in Little Andaman Island, funded by the US Fish and Wildlife Service; this was originally initiated by MCBT in Great Nicobar Island in 1999. ANET serves as the host institution for the Long-Term Ecological Monitoring (LTEO) Project of the National Centre for Biological Sciences, Bangalore and as the Andaman field station for the Long-Term Ecological Observatory Project of the MoEFCC and the Indian Institute of Science, Bangalore.

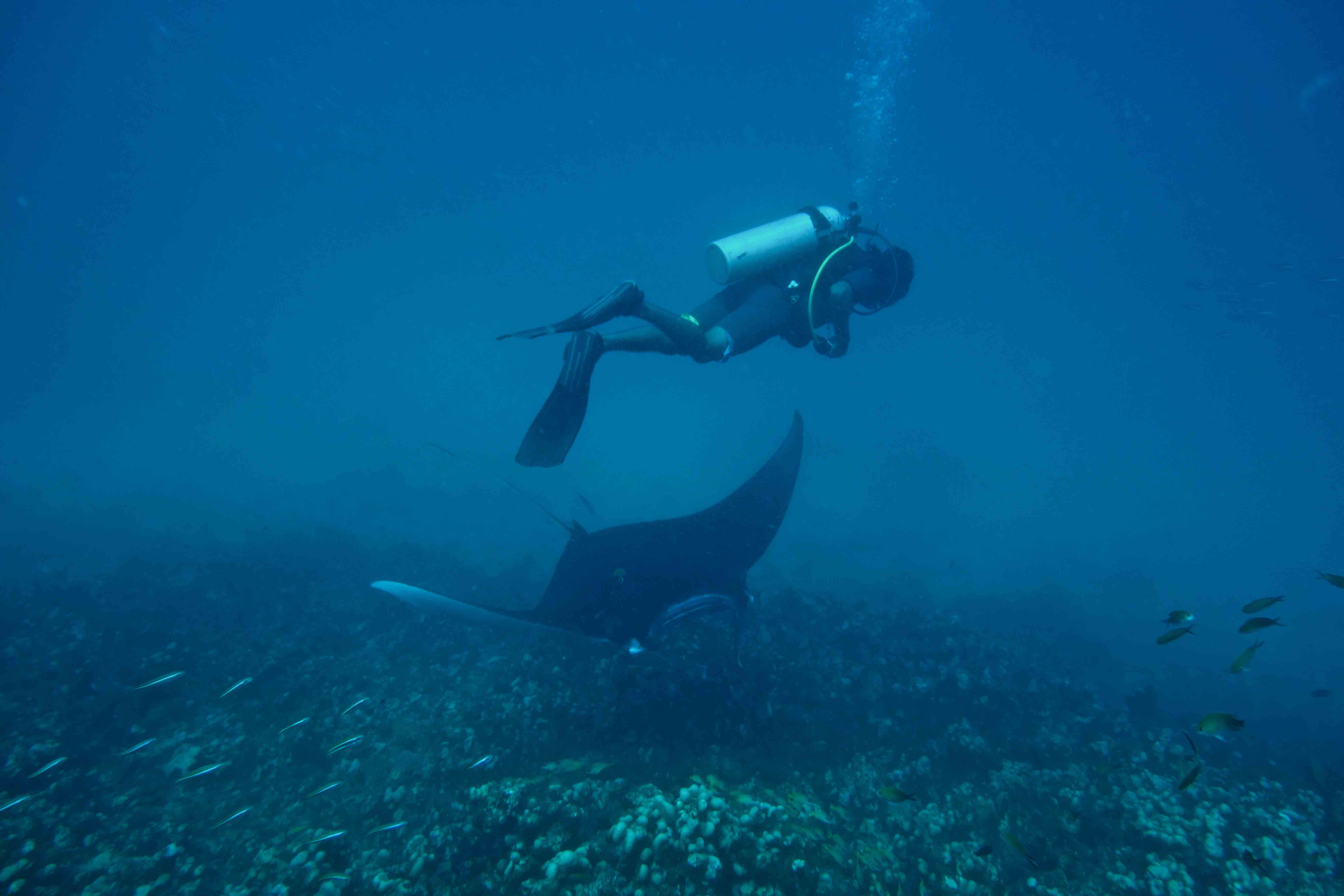
Underwater research-Ray

Working with local communities and government departments across the islands, ANET spearheads a number of on-the-ground interventions that are focused on the preservation of biodiversity, improving local livelihoods, place-based and experiential education, training and support for environmental stewardship, waste management and policy support. Intervention work carried out by ANET includes a Learning Lab focusing on foundational literacy and numeracy, supported by WIPRO and several new initiatives on health and sports supported by Blue Ventures and SOL Foundation respectively. ANET/Dakshin Foundation also supports the Andaman Karen Crafts, a cooperative initiative for strengthening socio-economic, cultural and ecological connections among the Karen of Middle Andaman. ANET is currently in the process of initiating its first community centre in Wandoor with funding from SEACOLOGY.

While initial institutional agendas were focused primarily on environmental themes, as a civil society entity working in marginal land and seascapes in the islands, ANET has been faced with a number of practical and ethical dilemmas that call for introspection about the institution's positioning and effectiveness in relation to other sectors. Hence, in the long run, the aim is to venture beyond the narrowly defined conservation-focused or environmental education-centred interventions to build synergies with institutions involved with other key social goals such as health, nutrition, and poverty alleviation. Moreover, as an institution that has its roots in conducting pioneering research and exploration surveys in these far-flung islands, ANET continues to focus on natural history, wildlife biology and the study of human engagements with nature.

== Post-tsunami assessment ==
The ANET also undertook the post-tsunami impact assessment and evaluation of requirements for the people of Nicobar island and worked in the relief and rehabilitation process in the worst affected areas within central Nicobar, which includes the construction of 400 semi-permanent houses at Katchal at a cost of ₹ 8.976 million.
