= Guindy National Park =

National park in Tamil Nadu, India

- IUCN category II (national park)
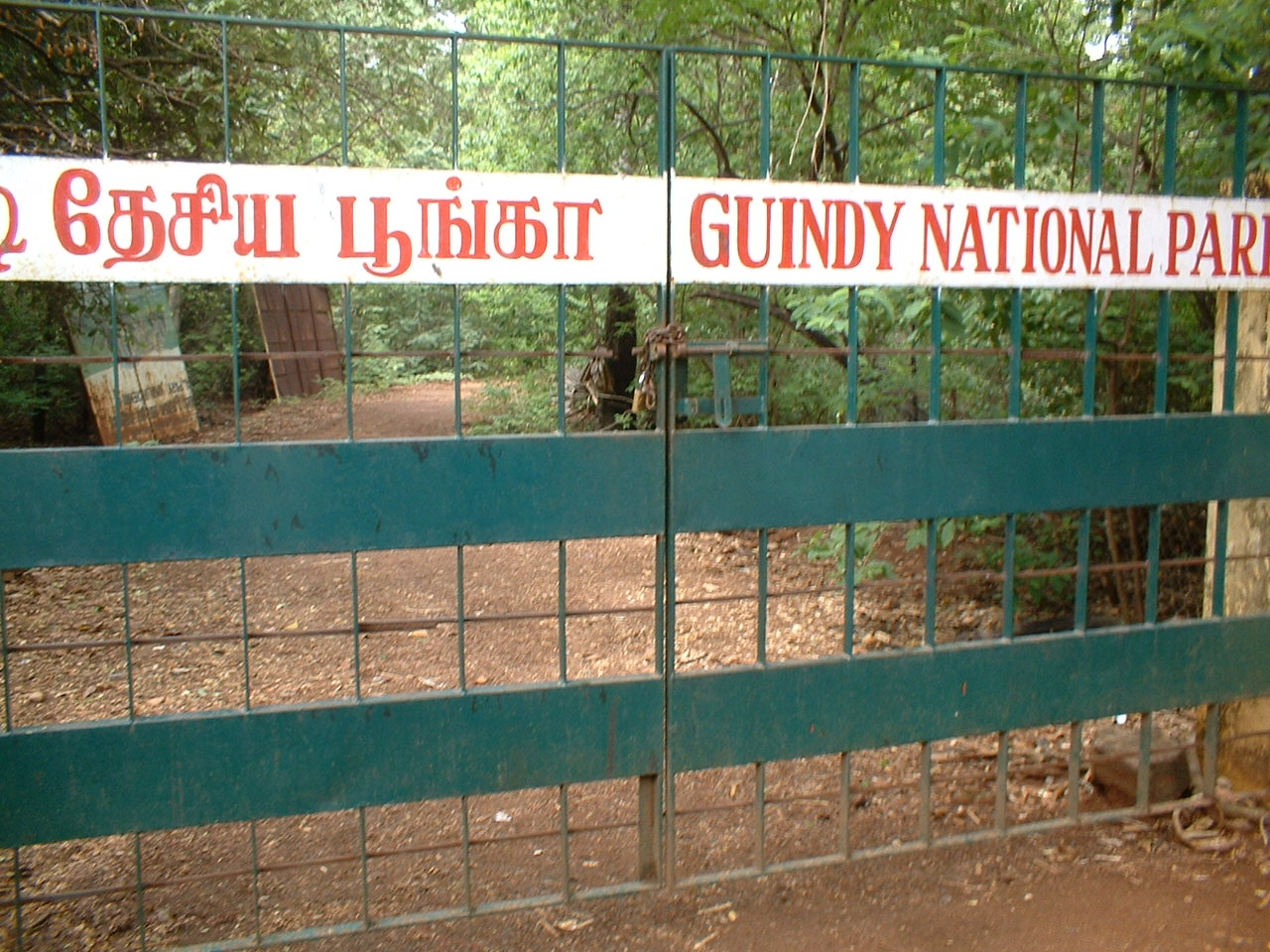
- Guindy National Park entrance

- Location within Chennai Location within Tamil Nadu Location within India
- Interactive map of Guindy National Park
- Location: Chennai, Tamil Nadu, India
- Nearest city: Chennai
- Coordinates: 13.0036°N 80.2293°E
- Area: 2.7057 km^{2} (1.0447 sq mi)
- Established: 1977
- Visitors: 700,000 (in 2006)
- Governing body: Tamil Nadu Forest Department
- Website: forests.tn.nic.in

Guindy National Park is a protected area, located in Chennai, India. Spread across 2.70 km^{2} (1.04 sq mi), it is one of the smallest National Parks in India and one of the few national parks situated inside a metropolitan area. The park is an extension of the grounds surrounding Raj Bhavan, the official residence of the Governor of Tamil Nadu and encloses forests, scrub lands, lakes and streams.

The park has a role in both ex situ and in situ conservation and is home to a variety of species including a wide variety of snakes, geckos, tortoises, over 130 species of birds, 14 species of mammals including 400 blackbucks, 2,000 spotted deer, 24 jackals, over 60 species of butterflies and spiders each and other invertebrates. These are free-ranging fauna that live with minimal interference from human beings. Guindy Snake Park, formerly the location of Madras Crocodile Bank Trust and Children's Park are located next to the park in the same premises. As of 2007, the parks had 700,000 annual visitors.

== History ==
Covering an area of 5 km^{2} (1.93 sq mi), the park was one of the last remnants of tropical dry evergreen forest along the Coromandel Coast and was originally a game reserve. In the early 1670s, a garden space was carved out of the area and a residence called the Guindy Lodge was built by Governor William Langhorne (1672–1678) for recreation. The remaining of the forest area was owned by Gilbert Rodericks, from whom it was purchased by the Government of Madras in 1821 for a sum of ₹ 35,000. The original area of 505 ha (1,250 acres) was established as a Reserve Forest in 1910.

Between 1961 and 1977, about 172 ha (430 acres) of the forest, was transferred to various government departments in order to build educational institutions and memorials. In 1958, a portion of the forest area was transferred to the Union Education Ministry for establishing the Indian Institute of Technology, Madras (IIT). In the same year, a portion of the land was transferred to the Tamil Nadu Forest Department for creating the Guindy Deer Park and Children's Park under the direction of then Prime Minister of India, Jawaharlal Nehru. Memorials for Rajaji and Kamaraj were built in 1974 and 1975, respectively, from parcels of land acquired from the reserve. In 1977, the remaining forest area was transferred to the Forest Department and in 1978, it was declared a national park. It was walled off from the adjacent Raj Bhavan and IIT Madras in the late 1980s.

== Habitat ==
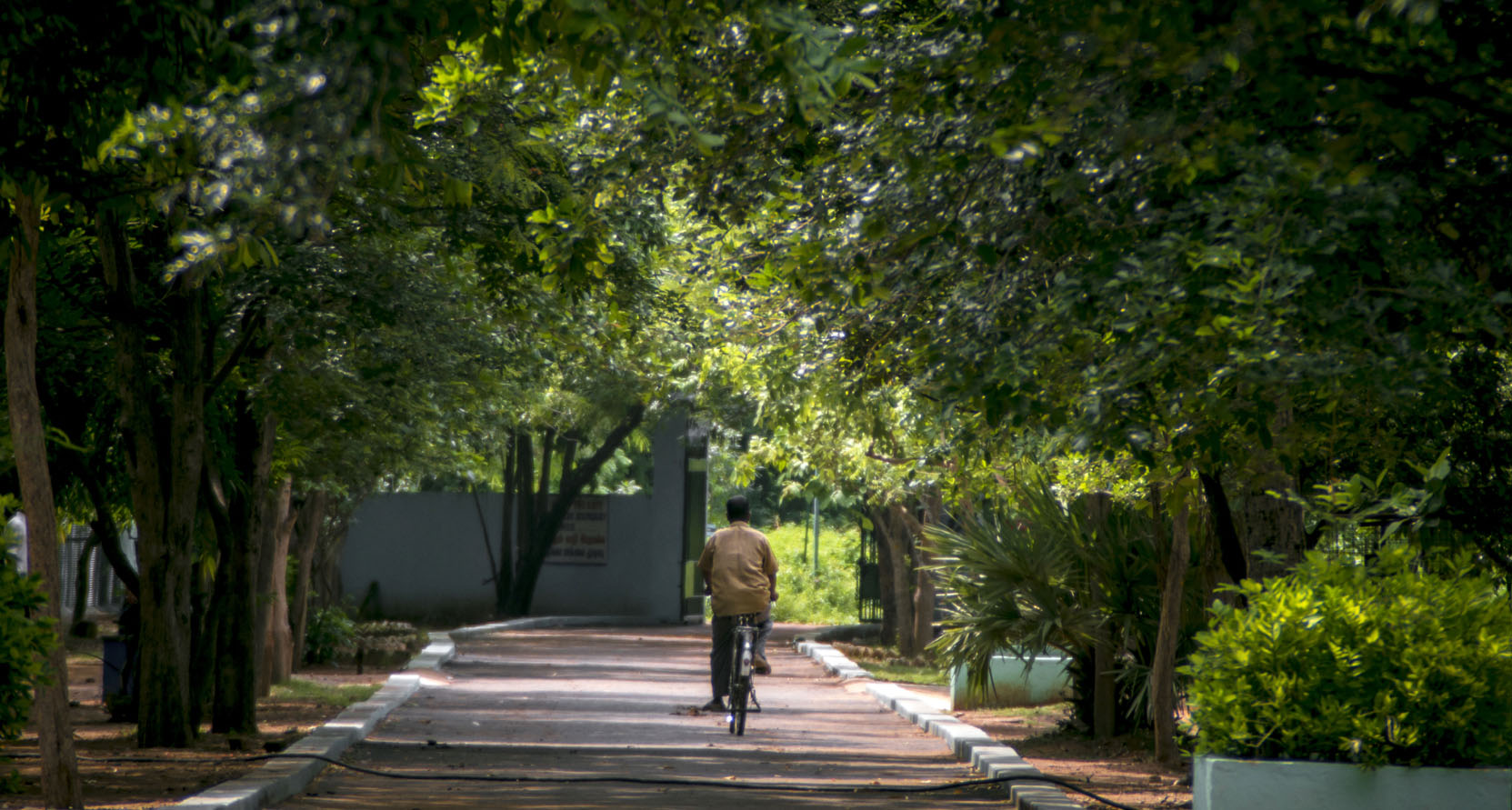
Inside the park

The Guindy National Park had historically enjoyed a certain degree of protection and was one of the last remnants of the natural habitats that typify the natural range of plant and animal biodiversity of the Coromandel coastal plains in the northeastern Tamil Nadu. The park has a tropical climate with mean annual temperatures of 32.9 °C (91.2 °F) (maximum) and 24.3 °C (75.7 °F) (minimum). Rainfall ranges from 522 mm (20.6 in) to 2,135 mm (84.1 in), with an average annual rainfall of 1,215 mm (47.8 in). The summer season in April and May determines the peculiar vegetation of the coast. Between June and December, wet season prevails, with dry season occurring between January and March. The area also has a cleared meadow called Polo Field measuring about 230 m (750 ft) by 160 m (520 ft) and a lake known as the 'Tangal Eri'. The presence of the park and the surrounding green areas resulted in the epithet the green lungs of Chennai. The park is protected by a perimeter wall for a length of 9.5 km (5.9 mi). There is an extensive network of roads and trails. The road network covers about 14 km (8.7 mi) within the park. The park has two large tanks, namely, Kathan Kollai and Appalam Kolam, in addition to two ponds, which usually dry up during summer.

== Flora ==
The park has a dry evergreen scrub and thorn forest, grasslands and water bodies with over 350 species of plants including shrubs, climbers, herbs and grasses and over 24 variety of trees, including the sugar-apple, Atlantia monophylla, wood-apple, and neem. The region's physiognomy occurs as discontinuous or dense scrub-woodlands and thickets, containing species such as introduced Acacia planifrons, Clausena dentata shrubs, palmyrah palm (Borassus flabellifer), Randia dumetorum, Randia malabarica, Carissa spinarum, Acacia chundra, exotic cactus Cereus peruviana and Glycosmis mauritiana. This flora provides an ideal habitat for over 150 species of birds. About one-sixth of the park has been left as open grassland to preserve that habitat for blackbucks. Though both the species of blackbuck and spotted deer have their natural habitat in grassland, the spotted deer prefer bushes and can adjust in land covered with shrubbery.

== Fauna ==
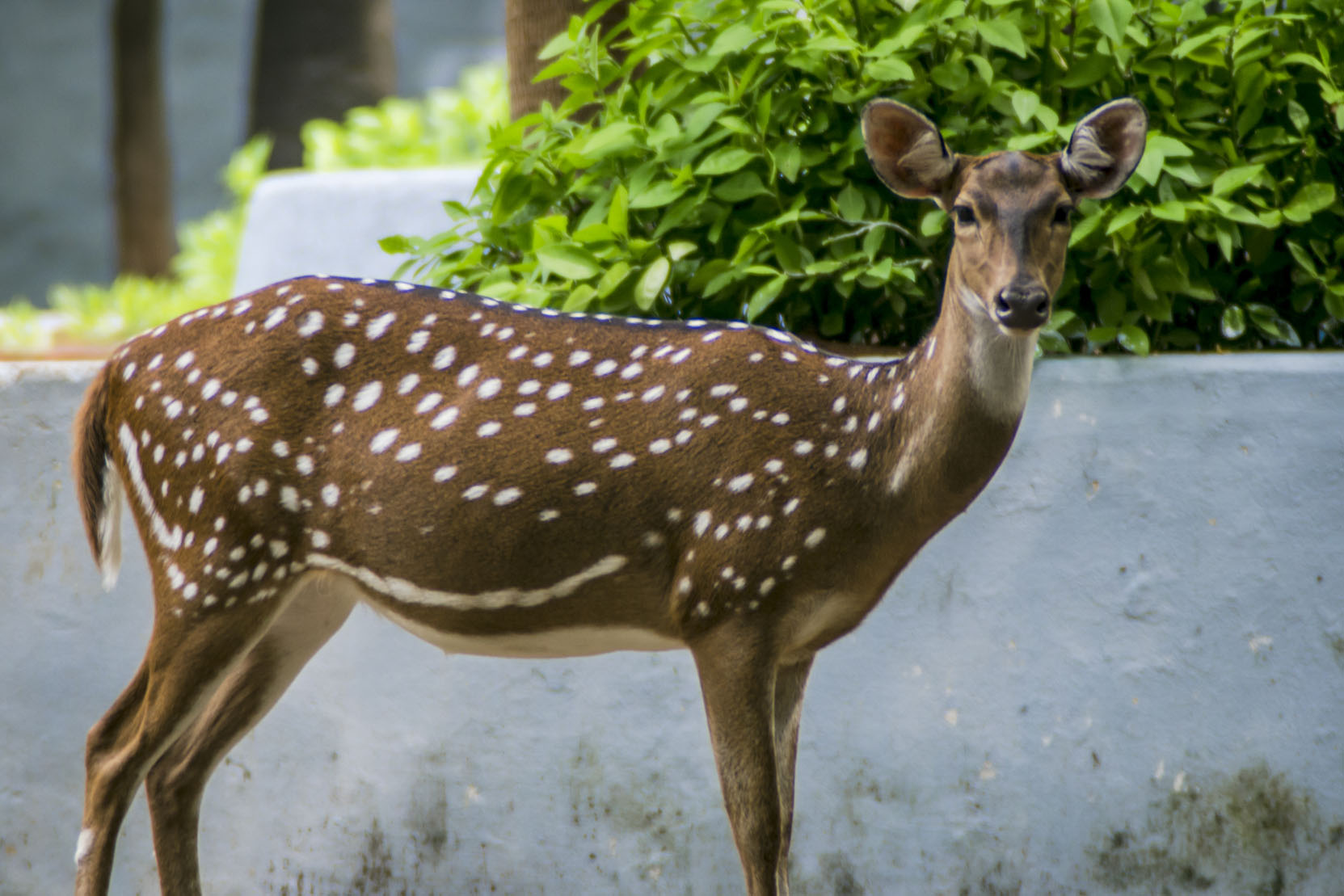
Wandering deer at the park

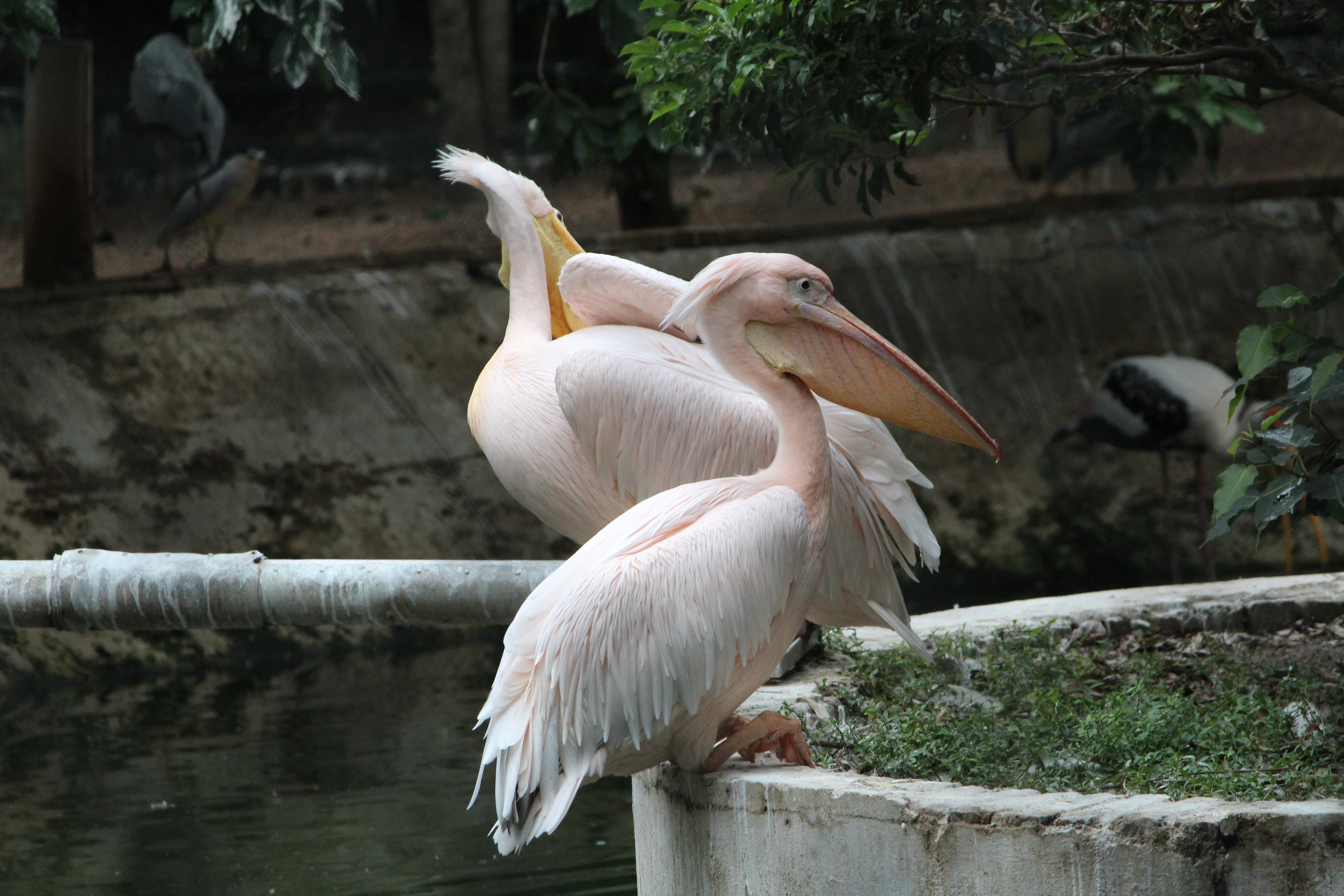
Pelican at Guindy national park

There are over 14 species of mammals including blackbuck, chital, jackal, small Indian civet, common palm civet, bonnet macaque, hyena, pangolin, hedgehog, common mongoose, Indian palm squirrel, and Indian hare apart from several species of bats and rodents. The near threatened blackbuck, considered as the flagship species of the park, was introduced in 1924 by Freeman Freeman-Thomas. Albino male blackbucks were also introduced to the park by the Maharaja of Bhavnagar. While the blackbuck population has seen a decline, the chital population has increased in the last century. As per the census conducted on 29 February 2004, there were 405 blackbucks.(including 10 in the IIT campus), and 2,650 chitals including 1,743 females and 336 fawns.

The park has over 150 species of birds including grey partridge, crow pheasant, parrot, quail, paradise flycatcher, black-winged kite, honey buzzard, pariah kite, golden-backed woodpecker, yellow-wattled lapwing, red-wattled lapwing, blue-faced malkoha, shrikes, Asian koel, minivets, munias, parakeet, tailor bird, robin, drongo, and stone curlew. Bird watchers anticipate migratory birds here like teals, garganeys, pochards, medium egrets, large egrets, night herons, pond herons and open-billed storks every fall season. The park is home to about nine species of amphibians There park hosts reptiles such saw-scaled viper, fan-throated lizard, and Indian monitor lizard. There are other species of lizards, geckos, chameleons, turtles, and tortoises including the endangered Indian star tortoise. There are a large variety of insects including 60 species of spiders and 60 species of butterflies.

== Snake park and children's park ==
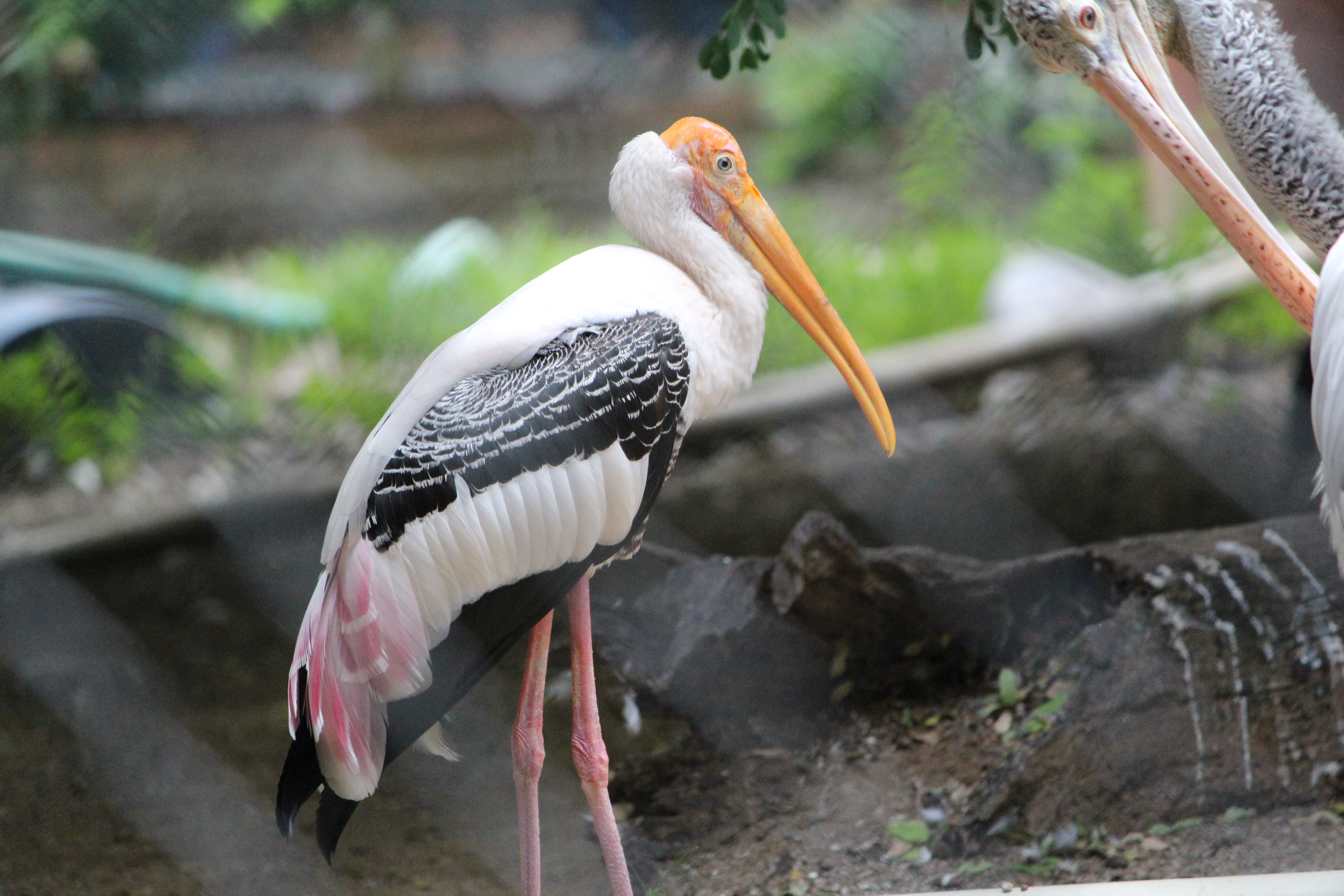
A painted stork in the park

Guindy Snake Park, formerly the location of Madras Crocodile Bank Trust, is next to the Guindy National Park. The Snake Park gained statutory recognition as a medium zoo from the Central Zoo Authority in 1995. The park is located on an 22 acres (8.9 ha) area of the National Park and includes a children's park and play area. The park displays king cobra, pythons, vipers and other reptiles, animals such as black buck, sambar, spotted deer, porcupine, jackal, crocodile, common otter, rhesus monkey, bonnet monkey and common langur and birds including grey pelican, night heron, cormorant, cockatiel, parrot, mongoose, common peafowl. The children's park also exhibits a fossilized tree specimen which is estimated to be about 20 million years old and has a statue of a Tyrannosaurus at the entrance. In December 2019, an augmented reality (AR) show with a capacity of 20 persons was opened to public.

== Location and access ==
Entry into this protected reserve is restricted, and visitors can go into the core area only when escorted by a forest ranger from the Forest Department. The children's park and the snake park have separate entrances from Sardar Patel Road next to the Adyar Cancer Institute and independent entry fees. The parks are open from 9 AM to 6 PM on all days except Tuesday. The nearest railway stations are the Kasturba Nagar MRTS station on Chennai MRTS, Guindy railway station on the Chennai Suburban Railway and Guindy metro station on the Chennai Metro.

== See also ==
- Arignar Anna Zoological Park
- Birding in Chennai
- Parks in Chennai
- Chennai Snake Park Trust
- Madras Crocodile Bank Trust
- Marine Kingdom
- Pulicat Lake Bird Sanctuary
