= Pulicat Lake Bird Sanctuary =

Sanctuary for birds in India

- IUCN category IV (habitat/species management area)
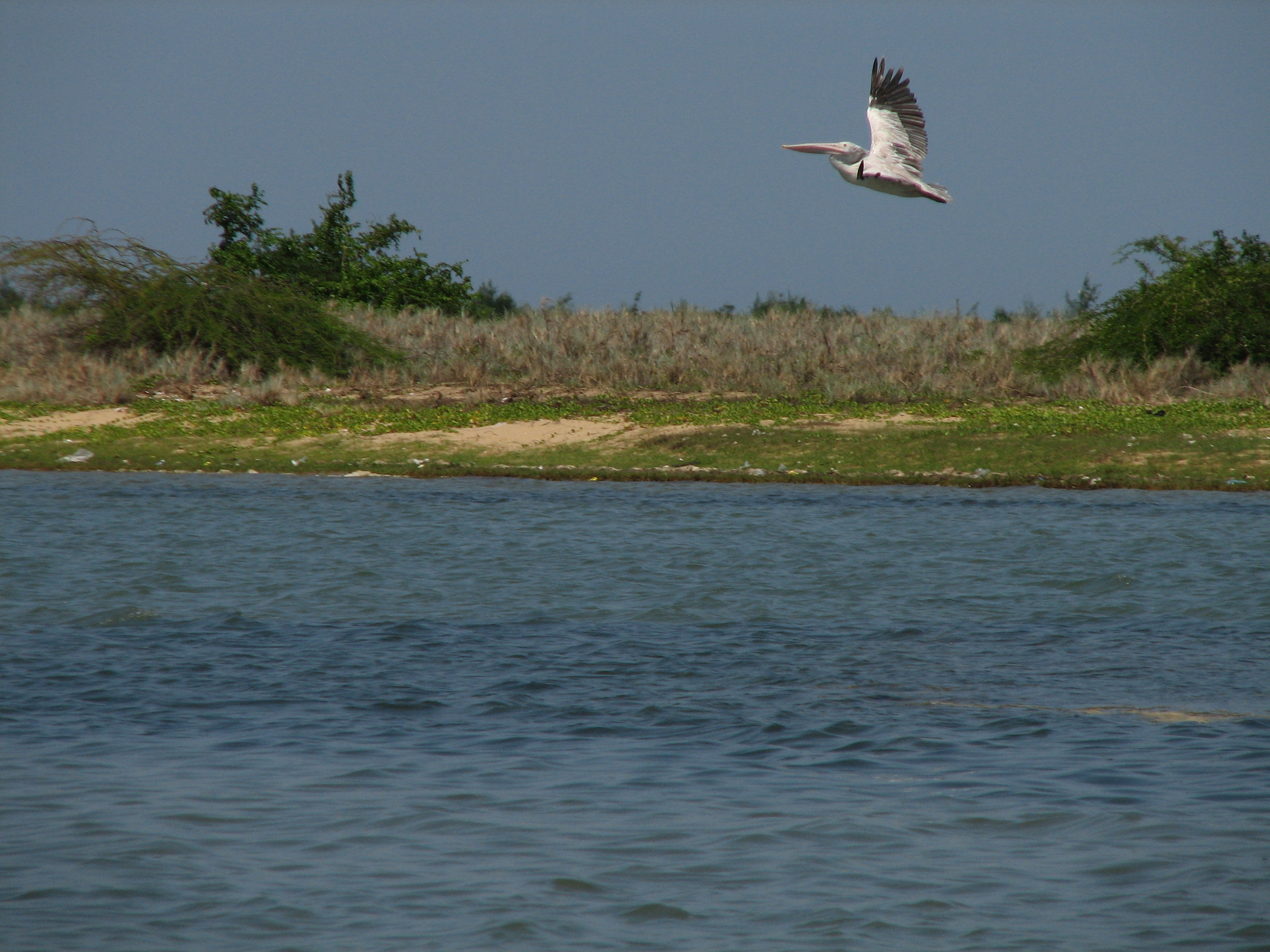
- Interactive map of Pulicat Lake Bird Sanctuary
- Location: Tirupati district, Andhra Pradesh, India
- Area: 759 km^{2} (293 sq mi)
- Established: 1976

Pulicat Lake Bird Sanctuary is a sanctuary for birds, 759 km^{2} (293 sq mi) in area, located in the Tirupati district of Andhra Pradesh and a protected area of the Thiruvallur District of Tamil Nadu, India. Pulicat Lake is the second largest brackish-water eco-system in India after Chilka lake in Orissa. The sanctuary's international name is Pulicat Lake Wildlife Sanctuary (IBA Code: IN261, Criteria: A1, A4iii).

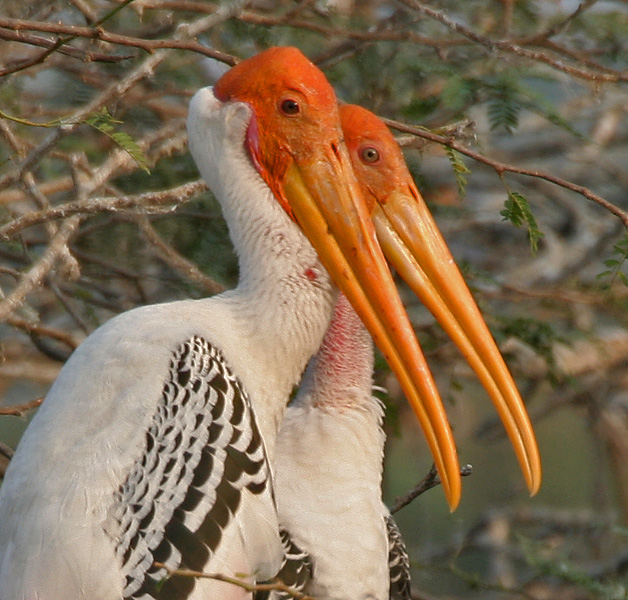
Painted stork (Mycteria leucocephala)

== Geography ==
Central location is: 13°34′N 80°12′E. 327.33 km^{2} (126.38 sq mi) is managed by the Andhra Pradesh Forest Department and 153.67 km^{2} (59.33 sq mi) is managed by the Tamil Nadu Forest Department. 108 km^{2} (42 sq mi) is a National Park area. Rainfall ranges from 800 to 2000 mm. Temperature varies from 14 to 33 °C (57 to 91 °F). Altitude ranges from 100 ft (30 m) above mean sea level to 1,200 ft (370 m) above mean sea level.

== Flora ==
The plant divercity is represented with about 132 plant species like Walsura piscida; Manilkara elengi, Excoecaria agallocaha, Spinifex littoreus, Calamus viminalis, and many more

== Fauna ==
The sanctuary is rich in invertebrate life including planktons, molluscs, insects, coelenterates and crustaceans. Jackal, Jungle cat, Black napped hare; are a few of the mammalian species inhabiting the Sanctuary.

The sanctuary has many greater flamingos. It attracts many migratory birds and also is a feeding and nesting ground for aquatic and terrestrial birds such as pelicans, storks, etc. The biodiversity of this lake attracts hundreds of thousands of visitors per year.

== Threats ==
Pulicat Lake may disappear within 100 years by being filled up with silt. Efforts by government and private non-governmental organizations are working to halt lake destruction. The Art & Architecture Research, Development and Education (AARDE) Foundation does regular activities at Pazhaverkadu to create awareness on the vanishing lagoon.

== See also ==
- Bird sanctuaries of India
- Vedanthangal Bird Sanctuary
- Guindy National Park
