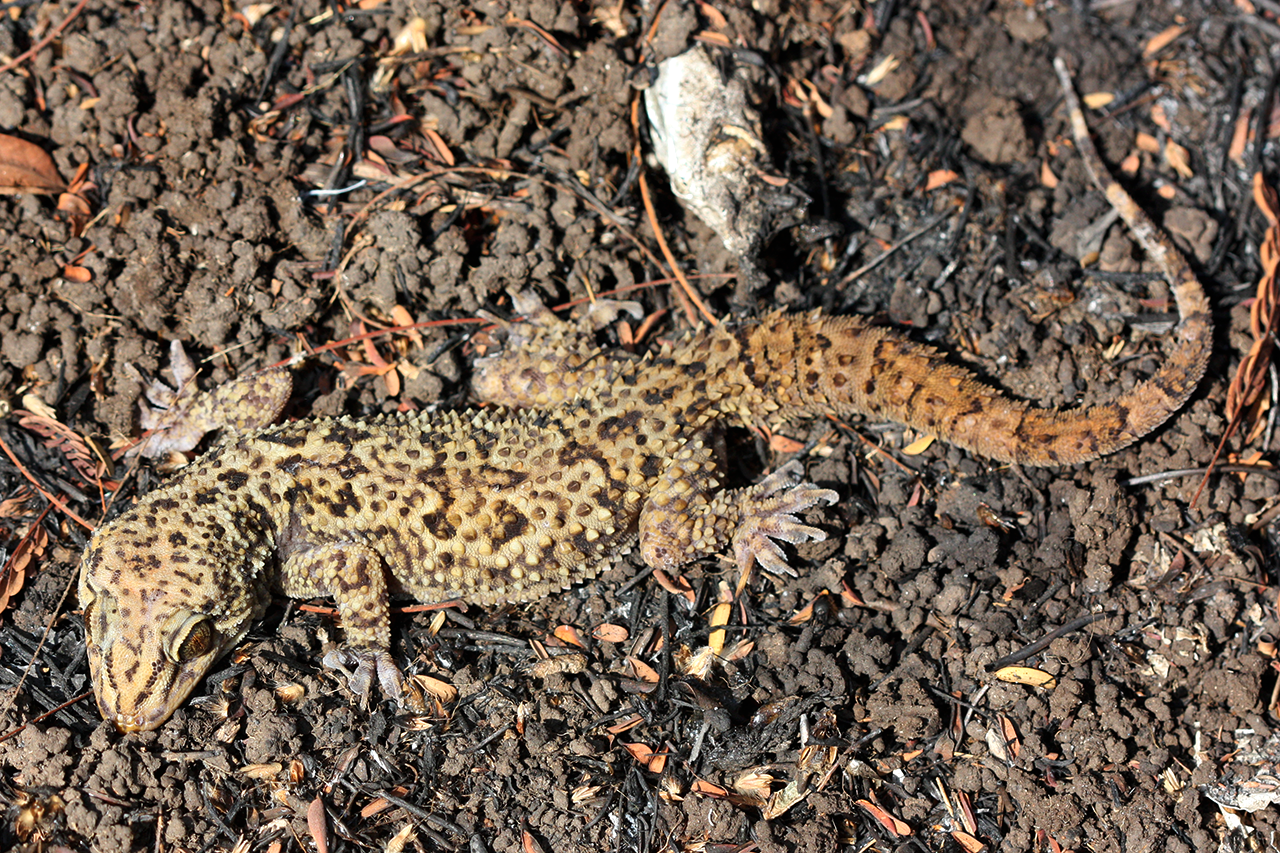

Conservation status
- Least Concern (IUCN 3.1)

Scientific classification
- Kingdom: Animalia
- Phylum: Chordata
- Class: Reptilia
- Order: Squamata
- Suborder: Gekkota
- Family: Gekkonidae
- Genus: Hemidactylus
- Species: H. maculatus

Binomial name
- Hemidactylus maculatus Duméril & Bibron, 1836

Synonyms
- Hemidactylus sykesii

= Hemidactylus maculatus =

Species of lizard

Hemidactylus maculatus, also known as the spotted leaf-toed gecko or giant spotted gecko, is a species of large gecko found in the Western Ghats of India and in parts of Sri Lanka.

== Description ==
Head large, oviform; snout longer than the distance between the eye and the ear-opening, 1.25 the diameter of the orbit; forehead concave; canthus rostralis swollen; ear-opening large, oval. Body and limbs moderate. Digits moderately dilated, free, inner well developed: infradigital lamellae almost perfectly straight, 9 to 11 under the inner digit, 12 or 13 under the median. Head covered anteriorly with convex granular scales, smaller in the frontal concavity, posteriorly with minute granules intermixed with round tubercles; rostral subtetragonal, not twice as broad as deep, with median cleft above; nostril pierced between the rostral, the first labial, and three or four nasals; 10 to 12 upper and 9 or 10 lower labials, mental large, triangular or pentagonal, twice as long as the adjacent labials; two pairs of chin-shields, the inner the larger, elongate, in contact behind the mental. Upper surfaces with minute, granular scales intermixed with moderate-sized trihedral, more or less strongly keeled tubercles, the largest not measuring more than one third the diameter of the eye; they are arranged very irregularly on the back, in about 20 longitudinal series. Abdominal scales smooth, roundish, imbricate. Male with a long series of femoral pores, 19 to 25 on each side, interrupted on the preanal region. Tail rounded, tapering, depressed; above with small irregular keeled scales, and 6 or 8 longitudinal series of large trihedral tubercles; beneath with a median series of transversely enlarged plates. Brown above, with darker spots, generally confluent into transverse undulating bands on the back; two more or less distinct dark streaks on each side of the head, passing through the eye; lower surfaces dirty white. From snout to vent 4.5 inches; tail 5.

== Distribution ==
Southern India and Sri Lanka. Race hunae: India (Malabar, Tirunelveli, Salem, near Madras), Sri Lanka. Type locality: restricted to Bombay by Smith 1935.
