= Marine Kingdom =

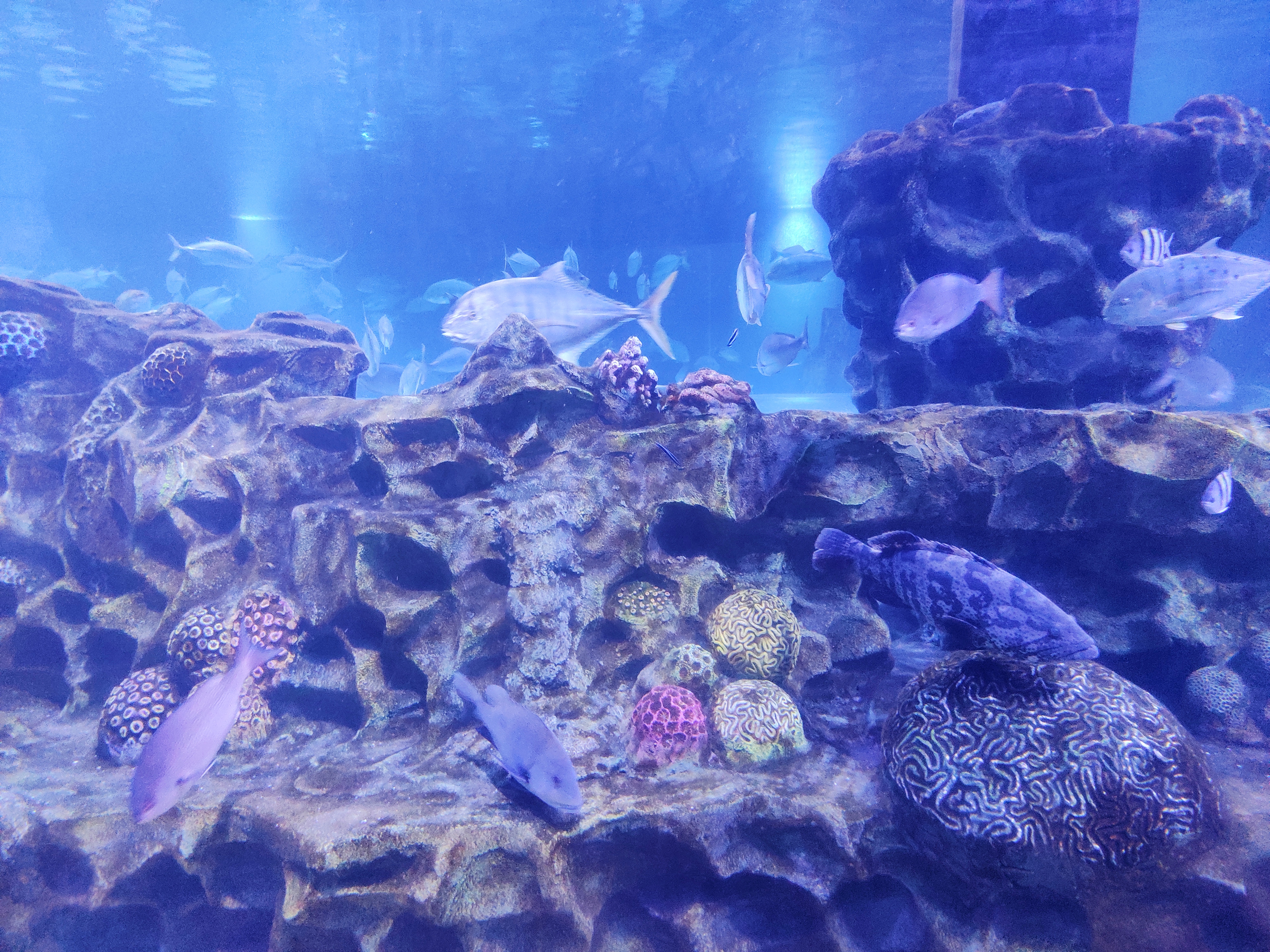
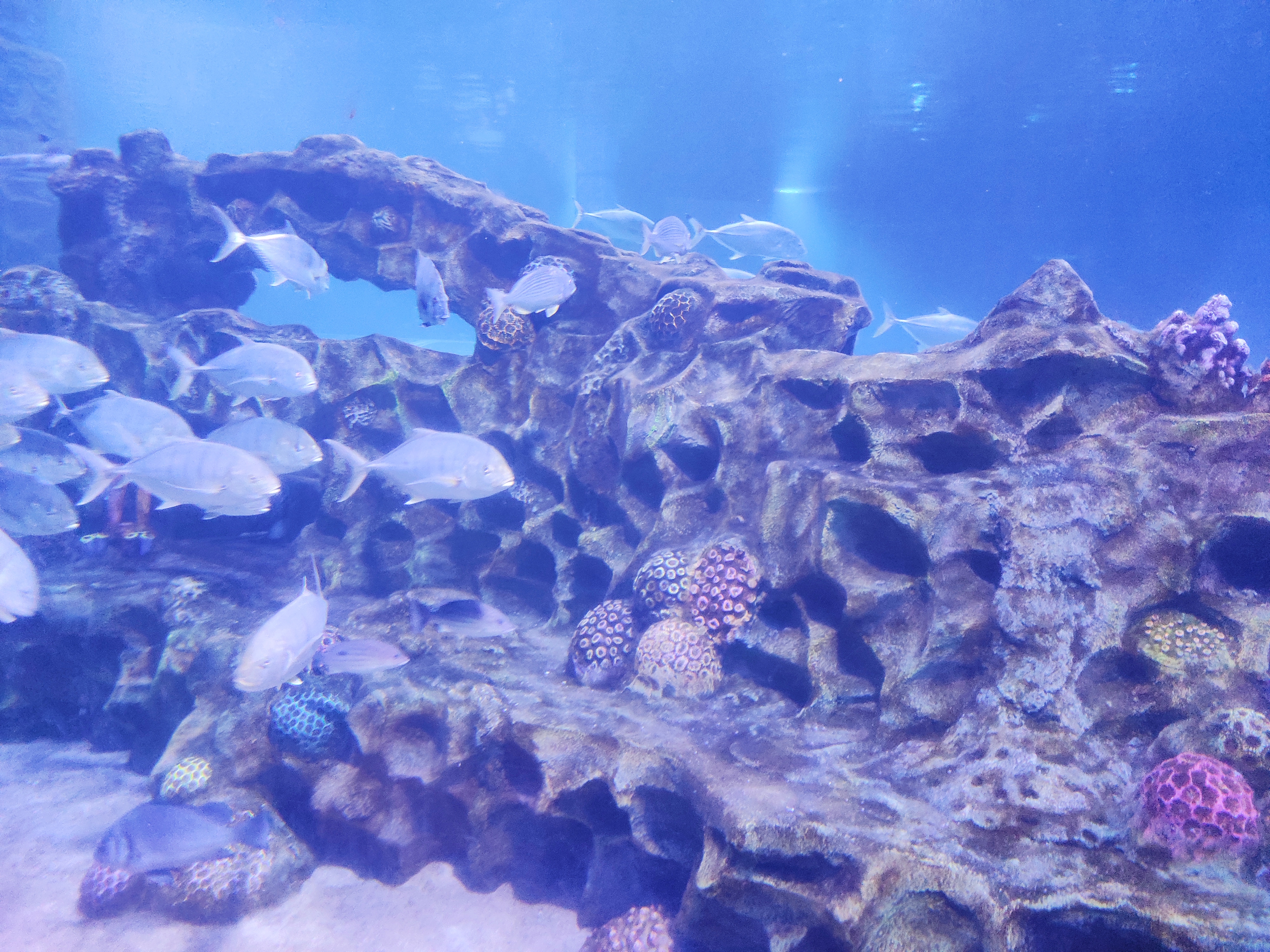
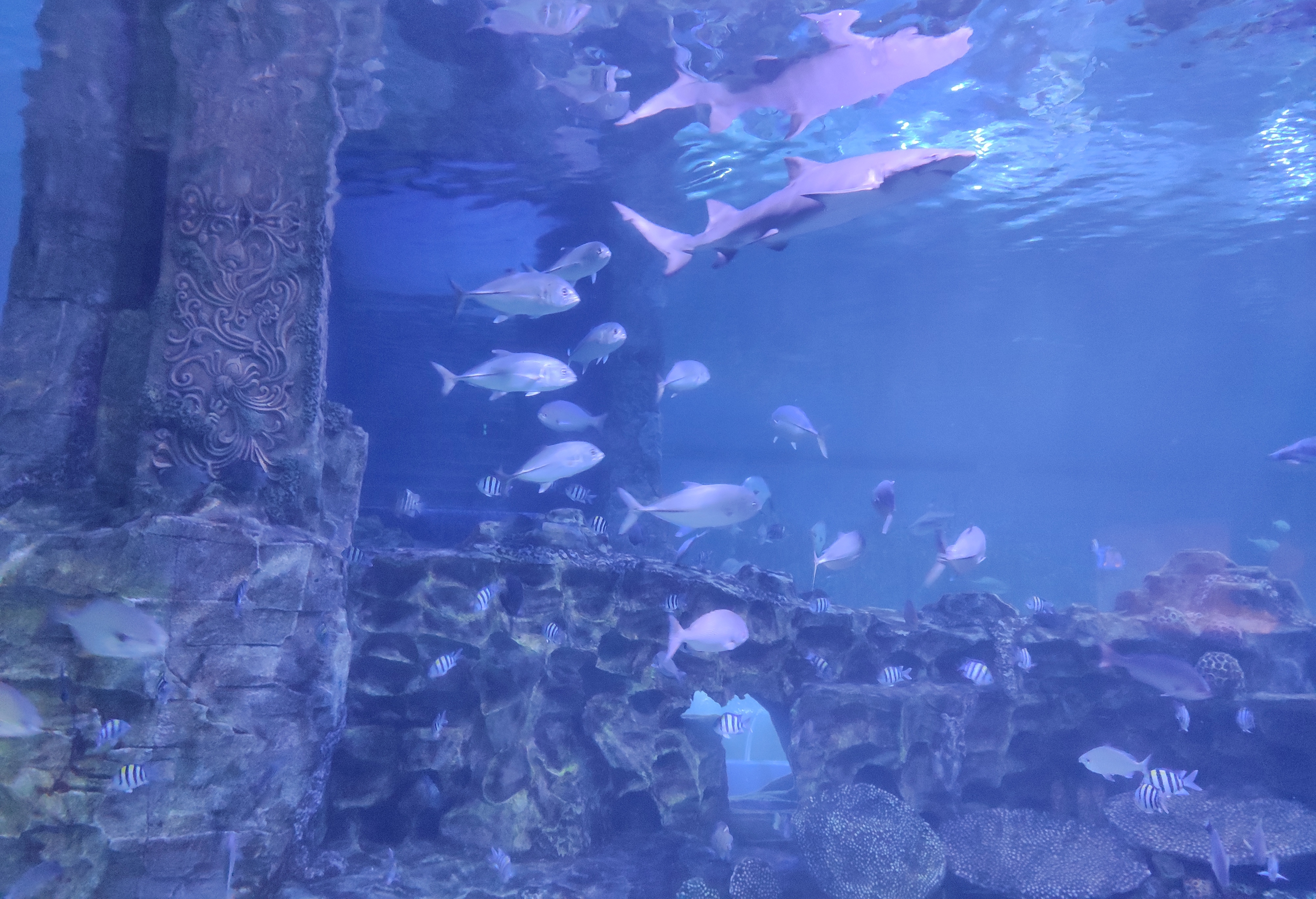
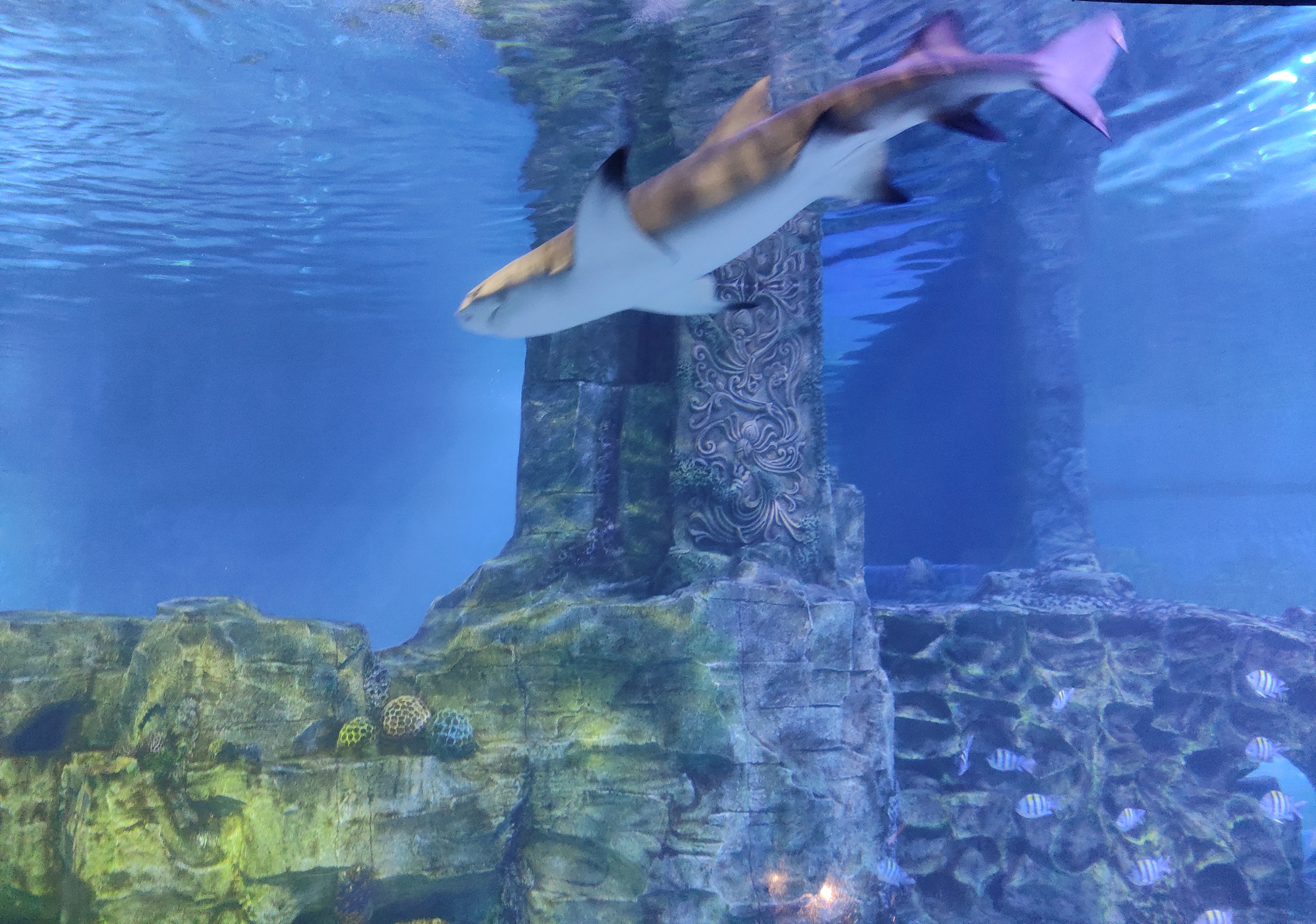
- Various exhibits at Marine Kingdom
- Interactive map of Marine Kingdom
- 12.9123°N 80.2508°E
- Date opened: 2019
- Location: Chennai, Tamil Nadu, India
- Land area: 7,500 m^{2} (81,000 sq ft)
- No. of species: 200
- Major exhibits: 35
- Website: vgpmarinekingdom.in

Marine Kingdom is an aquarium located along the East Coast Road in Chennai, India. It was opened for public in 2019. It is owned and operated by the VGP Group. The aquarium hosts the largest underwater walk-through tunnel in India.

== Description ==
Marine Kingdom is an aquarium located along the East Coast Road in Chennai, India. Spread over an area of 7,500 m^{2} (81,000 sq ft), it was built at a cost of ₹1.15 billion (US$12 million). It is owned and operated by the VGP Group. It was opened to public in 2019.

== Exhibits ==
The aquarium showcases 35 exhibit organised across five zones: rainforest, gorge, mangrove, coastal, and deep ocean. There are more than 200 species including various fishes, and other aquatic animals such as lobsters. Fishes on display include stingray, cichlids, blue tang, neon tetra, discus fish, marble angel fish, scat, razorfish, black ghost knifefish, butterfly fish, batfish, trevally, lemon shark, and other Indian freshwater fish. Apart from India, the fishes were sourced from other countries like Indonesia, Maldives, Sri Lanka, and Thailand. Some of the exhibits are displayed in 360 degree viewable tanks.

The aquarium has a 70 m (230 ft) long and 6.5 m (21 ft) deep underwater walk-through tunnel, which was the first of its kind in India. It was constructed by Turkish firm Polin aquariums using acrylic glass imported from Germany. There is an underwater mermaid show operational in the aquarium since 2019. The aquarium also unveiled a 7 ft (2.1 m) high underwater golu consisting of 50 dolls for Navaratri in 2022.

== Other facilities and future plans ==
The aquarium has a food court and a souvenir shop adjacent to it. There is an educational lab, aimed at creating awareness on wildlife conservation to students. A virtual tour was introduced in late 2019.

The aquarium has unveiled plans to add more exhibits such as dolphins, and other facilities such as scuba diving, an underwater restaurant, and luxury suites. It faced issues with funds for further expansion due to COVID-19 induced closure in 2020.
