= Crocodile Breeding Centre, Kurukshetra =

Bhor Saidan Crocodile Breeding Centre
- Wildlife breeding
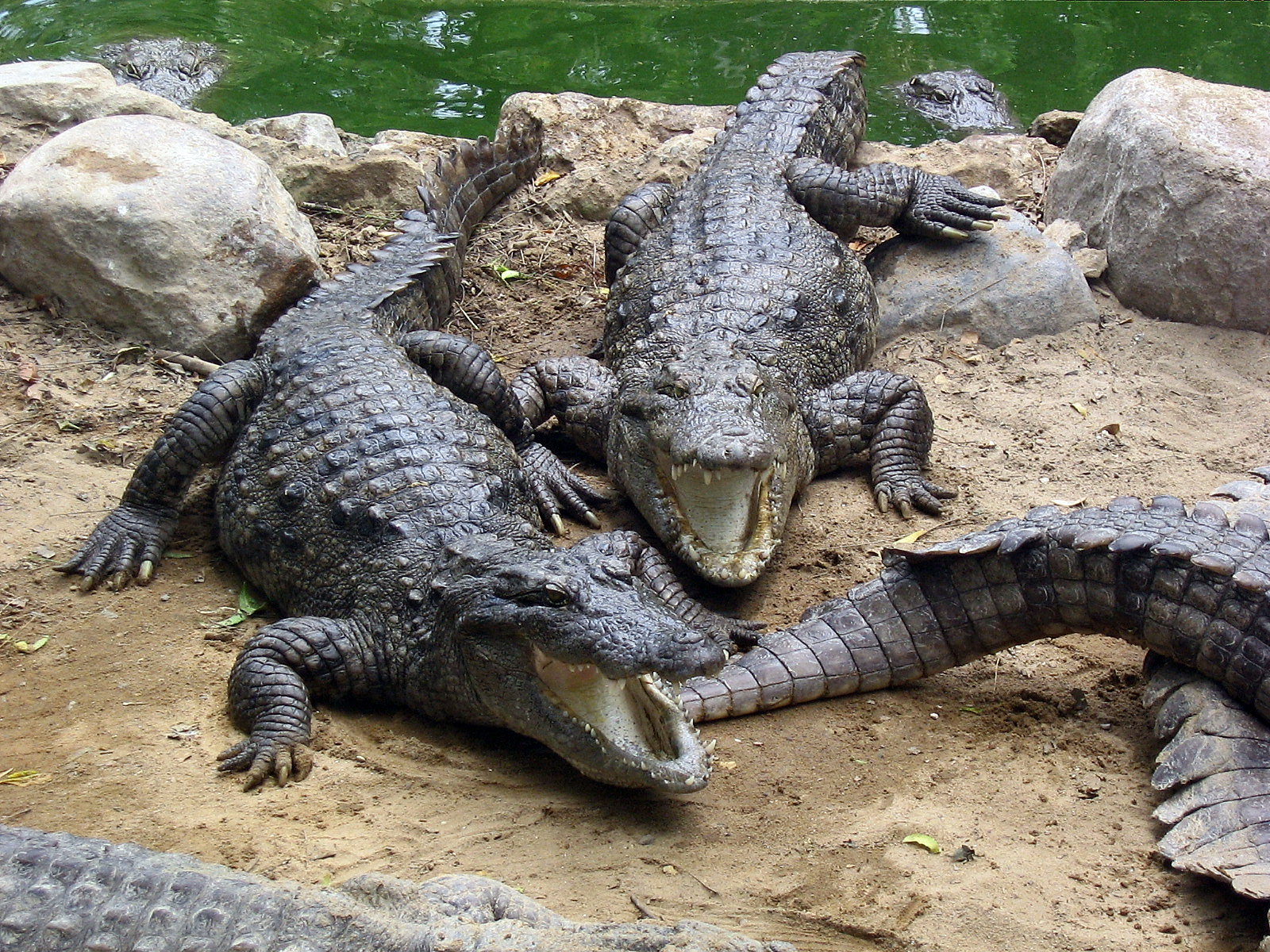

- Location in Haryana, India Bhor Saidan Crocodile Breeding Centre (India)
- Coordinates: 29°57′43″N 76°41′49″E
- Country: India
- State: Haryana
- District: Kurukshetra district
- Established: 1980
- Founder: Mahant

Government
  - Type: Government of Haryana
  - Body: Forests Department, Haryana

Languages
  - Official: Hindi
- Time zone: UTC+5:30 (IST)
- Website: www.haryanaforest.gov.in

Bhor Saidan Crocodile Breeding Centre, managed by the Haryana Forests Department to captive breed and conserve the freshwater mugger crocodile (Crocodylus palustris) native to India, is located at Bhor Saidan village on Kurukshetra-Pehowa Road in Kurukshetra district of Haryana in India. It is 13 km from the old Kurukshetra Bus Stand and 22 km from the new Kurukshetra Bus Stand in sector 10.

It is one of such 4 crocodile breeding centres in India, other two rated as top most success crocodile breeding centres by National Geographic Society are the Madras Crocodile Bank Trust (breeds all 3 native crocodile species of India - freshwater muggers, freshwater gharials and salt water crocodiles) and the Kukrail Gharial Rehabilitation Centre at Lucknow (breeds only freshwater gharials), and other being Manjira Wildlife Sanctuary.

Chhilchhila Wildlife Sanctuary is 10 km to the south between Nikatpura and Sarsa.

== History ==
In the 1930s, the Mahants of the nearby Bhureeshwar Temple brought few mugger crocodiles and released in the pond next to the temple. After the population of native mugger, gharial and estuarine saltwater crocodiles declined in India, the UNDP-FAO Crocodile Breeding and Management Project was launched in 1975 in co-operation with the Government of India (GoI) and various State Governments, 16 crocodile rehabilitation centres and 11 crocodile sanctuaries were established between 1975 and 1982 and crocodiles were released in 19 sanctuaries. Till the funding was stopped by the GoI in 1991, GoI had provided grant-in-aid funding to states on 50:50 ratio. Bhor Saidan is one of those crocodile sanctuaries established in 1982 by GoI as part of the UNDP-FAO Crocodile Breeding Project. In 1982–83, the Bhor Saidan village panchayat gave 15+ acre land to the Government of Haryana to expand the breeding centre and the Forests Department of Haryana took over the management of the breeding centre.

== Significance ==
=== Ecological significance ===
IUCN Red List of threatened species, lists mugger as “vulnerable”. CITES, a multilateral treaty for protecting endangered plants and animals, lists crocodiles under Appendix-I of species threatened with extinction. There are only 5700 to 8700 muggers in the wild.

=== Religious significance ===
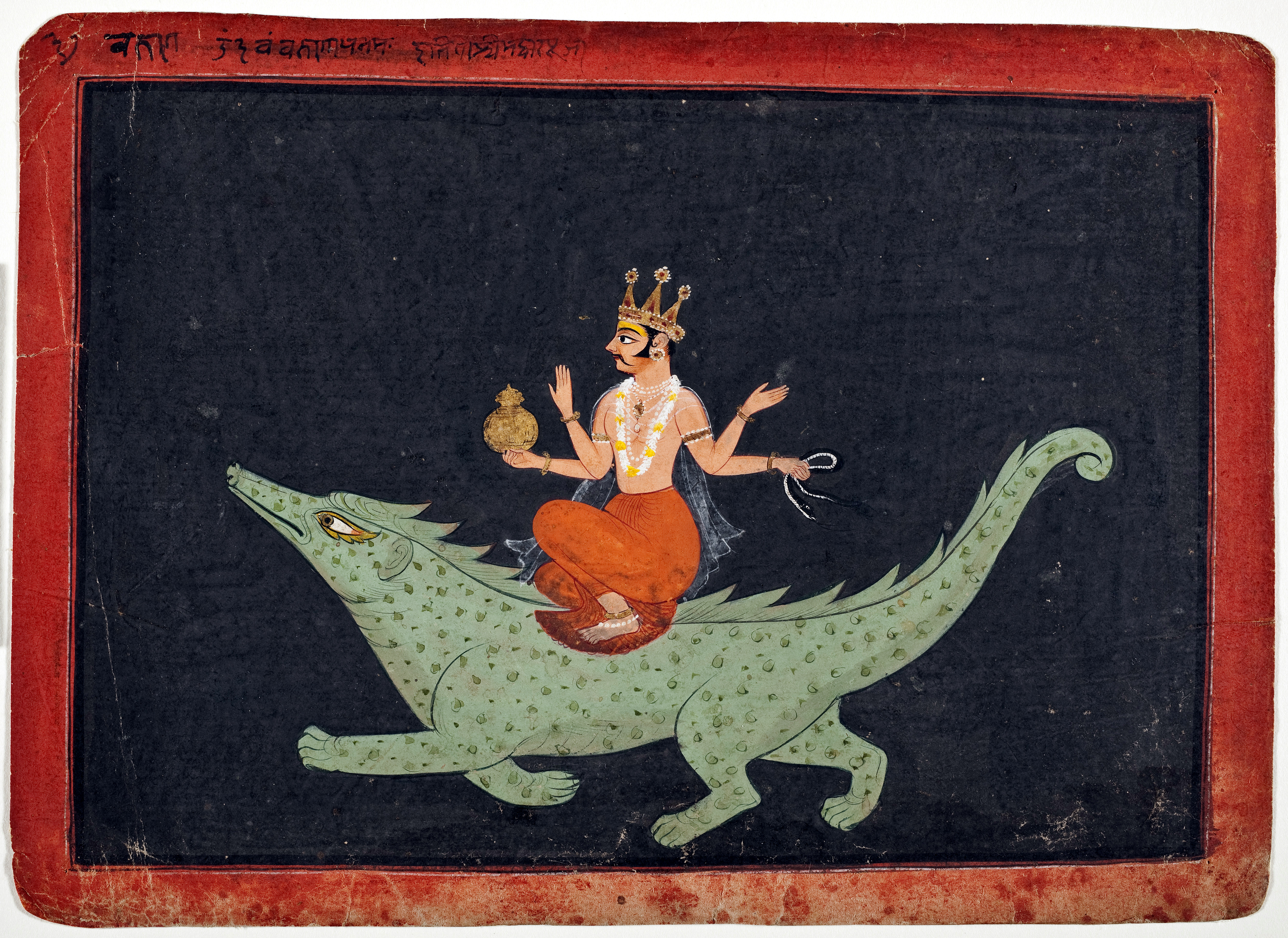
A crocodile-like Makara as Varuna's animal vehicle.

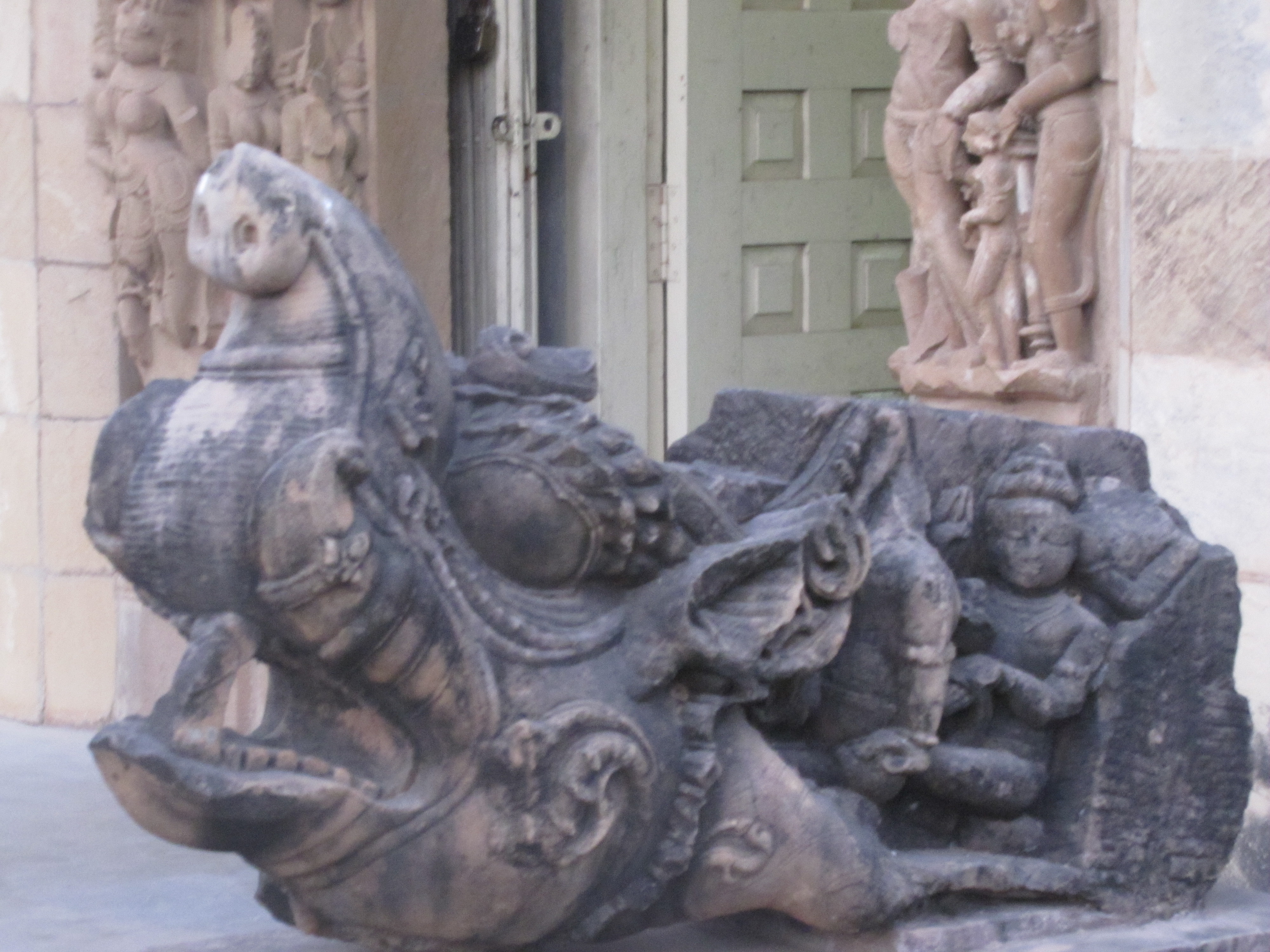
Makara Sculpture at Jain Museum, Khajuraho.

Crocodile Breeding Centre is located next to the Bhureeshwar Temple, which one of the tirth (pilgrimage site) in the 48 Kos Parikrama of Kurukshetra of the Lord Krishna pilgrimage circuit. Bhor Saidan village, sitting on an ancient archeological mound of Painted Grey Ware culture (1200 BCE to 600 BCE)) from the Vedic period of Mahabharata, is on the banks of dried up river bed of Sarasvati River, was named after Kaurava hero Bhurisrava of Mahabharta, son of Somadutta.

The Makara (crocodile), equivalent to the Zodiac sign Capricorn in Hindu astrology, is a revered legendary sea-creature in Hindu belief in which makara is the vahana (vehicle) of the sea god Varuna and the river goddess such as the Ganga, Narmada. Makara is the most commonly recurring creature in Hindu and Buddhist temple iconography, in which makara are considered guardians of gateways and thresholds, protecting throne rooms as well as entryways to temples; and also frequently appears as a spout attached to a water source.

Makara is also the insignia of the love god Kamadeva, who has no dedicated temples and is also known as Makaradhvaja, "one whose flag depicts a makara". Makara-shaped earrings called Makarakundalas are sometimes worn by the Hindu gods, for example Shiva, the Destroyer, or the Preserver-god Vishnu, the Sun god Surya, and the Mother Goddess Chandi. Lakshmi's depiction of sitting on a lotus in which she pulls the tongue of the elephant shaped makara is meant to project Lakshmi's image as the goddess of prosperity, wealth and well-being.

== Crocodiles At Bhor Saidan ==
=== Crocodiles conservation facilities ===
The centre comprises wild water ponds which are is used to rear Indian Mugger crocodiles. Periphery has been fenced and a mound inside the pond was created to watch the crocodiles from the close range. The Bhor Saidan centre is run by a team of two Forests Department employees: one wildlife sub-inspector and one caretaker. Crocodiles are fed five to six tons of fish every month, which costs nearly INR 10,00,000 per year.

=== Crocodiles population ===
In 2019, the crocodile population had increased to 32 including 15 female and 17 male. In 2014, the Crocodile Breeding Centre had 24 crocodiles including 10 male, 4 female and 10 young crocodiles.

=== Genetic diversification ===
To enhance the genetic diversity, 4 pairs of mugger crocodiles were brought from Madras Crocodile Bank Trust in 1991 for the first time. Thereafter, every year 2 to 3 muggers are brought from elsewhere and released at Bhor Saidan to enhance the genetic diversity.

== Conservation ==
=== Threats ===
According to the Animal Diversity Web, an online database of species distribution and conservation, the main threats to mugger crocodiles are the fragmentation and loss of natural habitat, the use of crocodile parts for medicinal purposes. drowning in fishing nets, stealing of eggs by people for food, and closure of several crocodile breeding facilities which use to breed crocodile and incubate crocodile eggs to increase the crocodile population.

=== Escape of Crocodiles and man-wildlife conflict ===
Around the mid-1980s, during the flood caused by the heavy rains several crocodiles escaped from the Bhor Saidan Crocodile Farm to nearby Saraswati drain and several villages have now become the habitat of escaped stray crocodiles that are caught from time to time in the nearby villages such as Mukimpura (1 km from Bhor Saidan Crocodile Breeding Centre) and Dabkheri (12 km from Bhor Saidan Crocodile Breeding Centre). From 2010 to 2016, 7 escaped crocodiles were caught in 6 years including 4 from the pond of Mukimpura and 3 from the SYL canal siphon 11 km from Bhor Saidan between Dabkheri and Jyotisar. In June 2019, a 12-feet mugger was caught from Dabkheri SYL canal siphon by Haryana Forests Department with the help of nets, after its sightings had sparked the fears of man-crocodile conflict. Captured crocodiles were released in the Bhor Saidan Crocodile Breeding Centre.

There is no systematic and scientific project to care for these crocodiles and to educated the villagers of the affected villages on the man-crocodile conflict management.

=== Crocodile adoption scheme ===
In 2015, Forests Department, Haryana launched a scheme for individuals, organizations and corporations to adopt animals in state's zoos and breeding centres, including at Bhor Saidan Crocodile Center.

This scheme has found no takers due to the poor management and lack of follow up efforts by the Haryana Forests Department.

=== Improvements required in the conservation effort ===
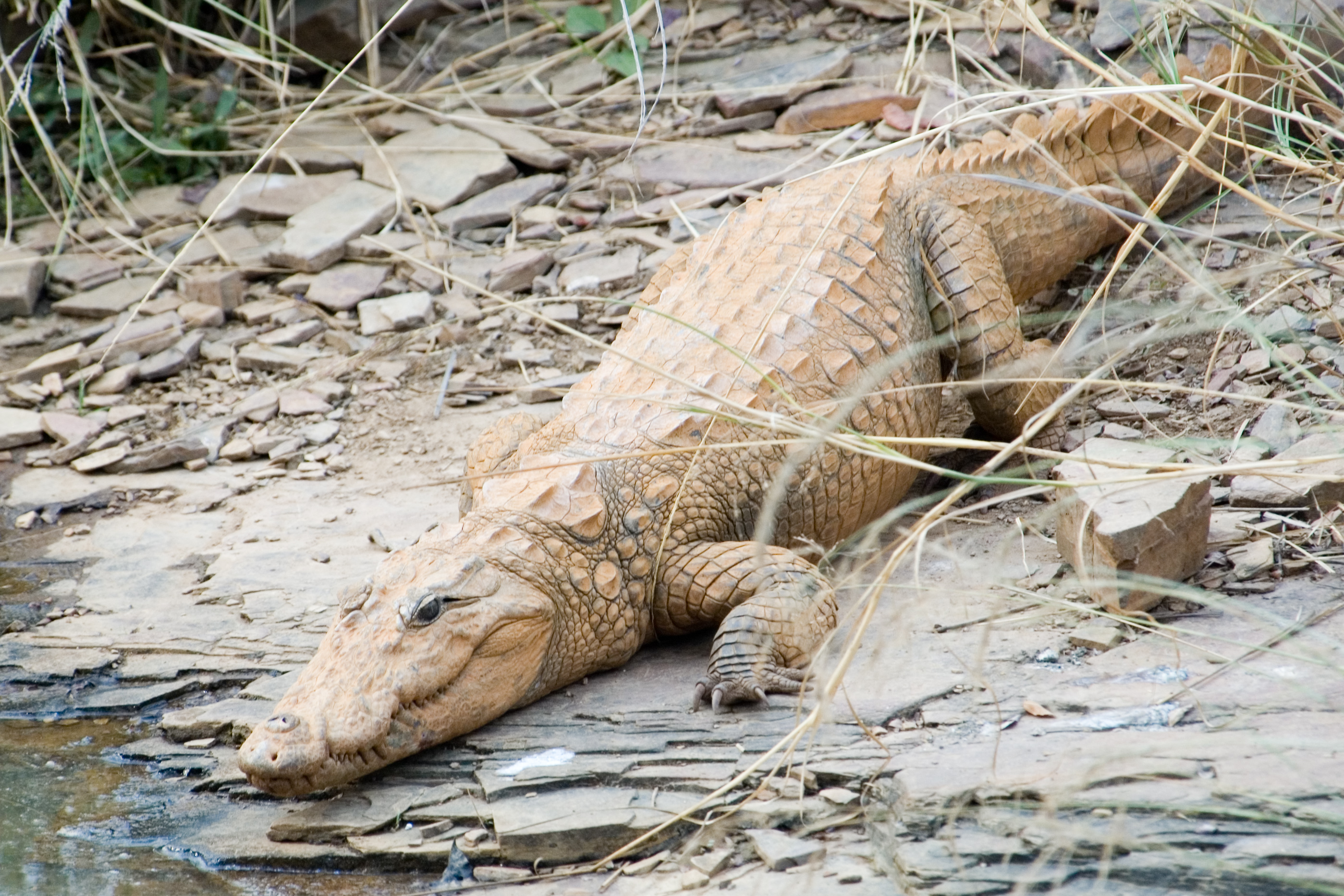
Mugger crocodile.

As of June 2021, there is no approved project to re-commence external intervention (e.g. artificial incubation of the eggs) and reintroduction of mugger and gharial in the water bodies of Haryana or nearby states with share the water bodies and borders with Haryana.

Each adult female crocodile at the Bhor Saidan Centre lays 25 to 30 eggs usually between 15 April to 15 May, based on which the number of surviving crocodiles is low. Since 2004, citing the overcrowding as a reason the caretakers at Bhor Saidan Crocodile Breeding Centre have stopped the external intervention for conservation e.g. artificial incubation of the eggs. The Forests Department staff at centre cited 4 main causes of low crocodile population at Bhor Saidan Breeding Centre, i.e. lack of breeding area for laying eggs as there are only 2 water ponds with combined total area of 4 acre, eating of young crocodiles by other unrelated crocodiles, unsuitable climate as crocodile survival is threatened when climatic temperature drops below 5' C or rises above 38' C, and high human activity. This does not seem an acceptable excuse. Madras Crocodile Bank Trust (MCBT), located on 8.5 acre land half the size of Bhor Sidan's 15 acre, has over 450,000 annual visitors including 13794 foreign visitors, with world's largest collections of crocodiles, 2483 animals of 28 herpetology species, 14 species of crocodiles including 3 endangered native Indian crocodile species, 10 species of turtles, 3 species of snakes, and 1 species of lizard. Whereas mismanaged Bhor Saidan, which compared to MCBT has double the land size with very low human activity, has only 32 crocodiles belonging to only 1 species and rarely sees visitors due to the poor infrastructure and lack of long-term integrated conservation strategy.

Activists have demanded to increase the number and size of the water ponds, increase the size of conservation area, bring water bodies in nearby villages under the crocodile conservation effort, recommencement of artificial incubation of eggs, separation of youngs from adults to avoid being eaten, building natural and artificial temperature controlled habitat, building an interpretation and awareness centre, establishment of Haryana state centre of excellence for herpetology research and conservation, formulation of multi-department multi-state integrated herpetology conservation effort by breeding and releasing in various water bodies of Haryana and nearby states.

== Gallery ==
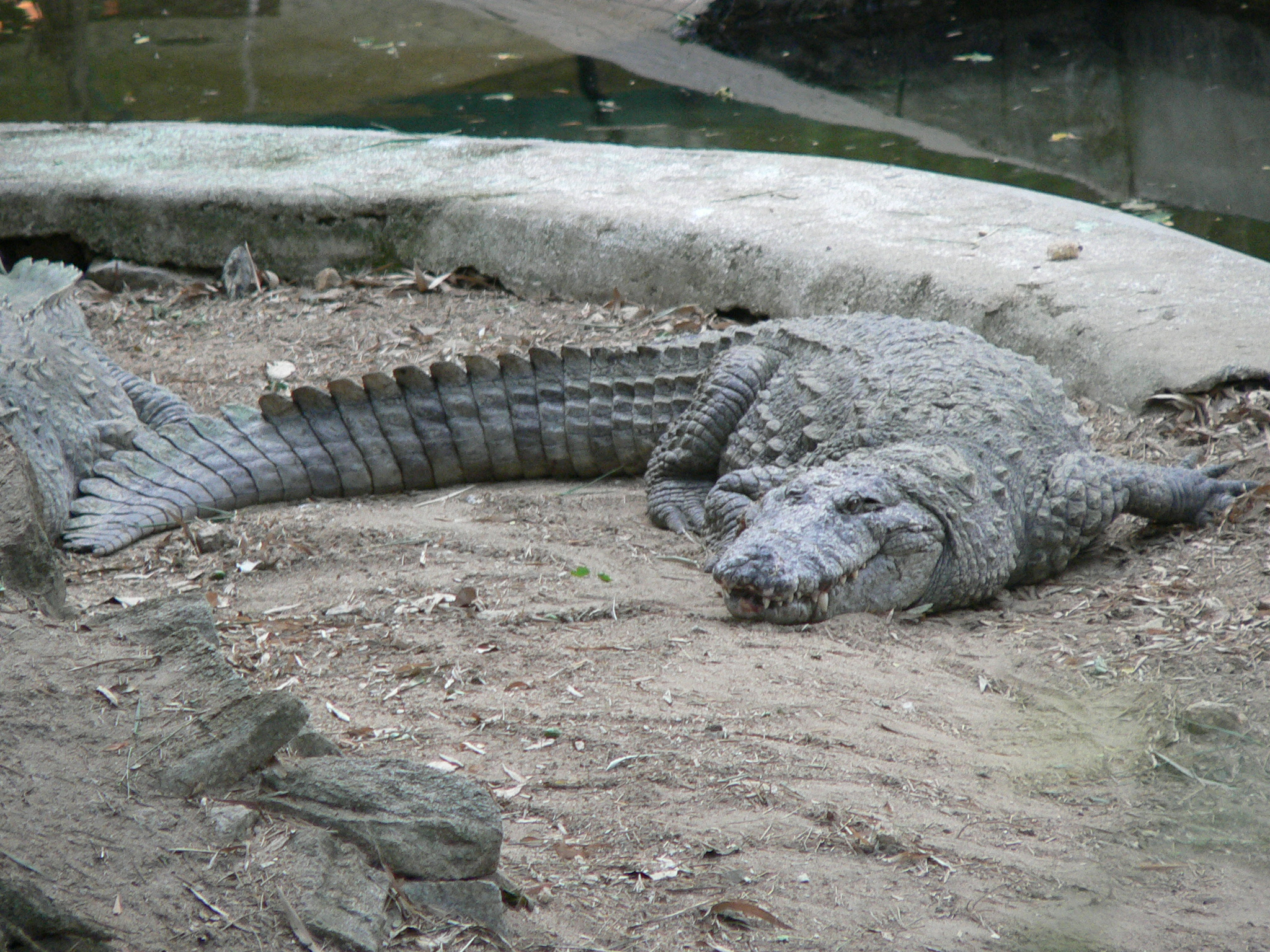
Adult male mugger crocodile

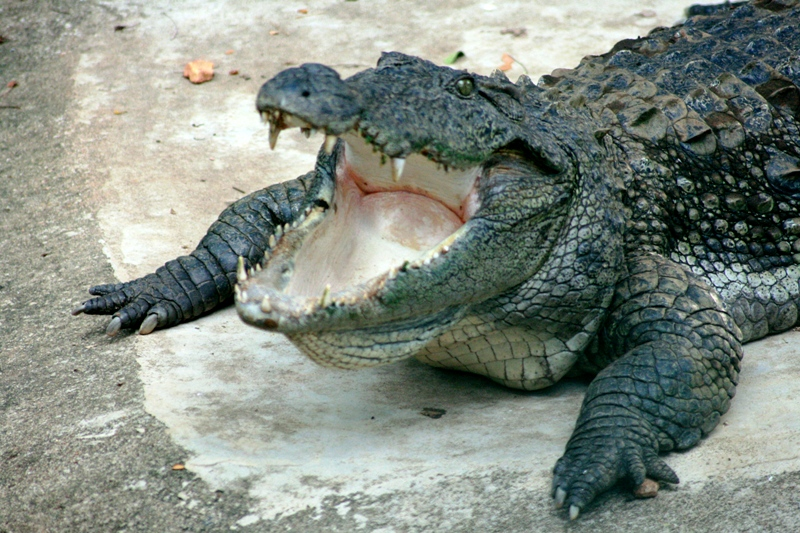
Crocodiles in captivity

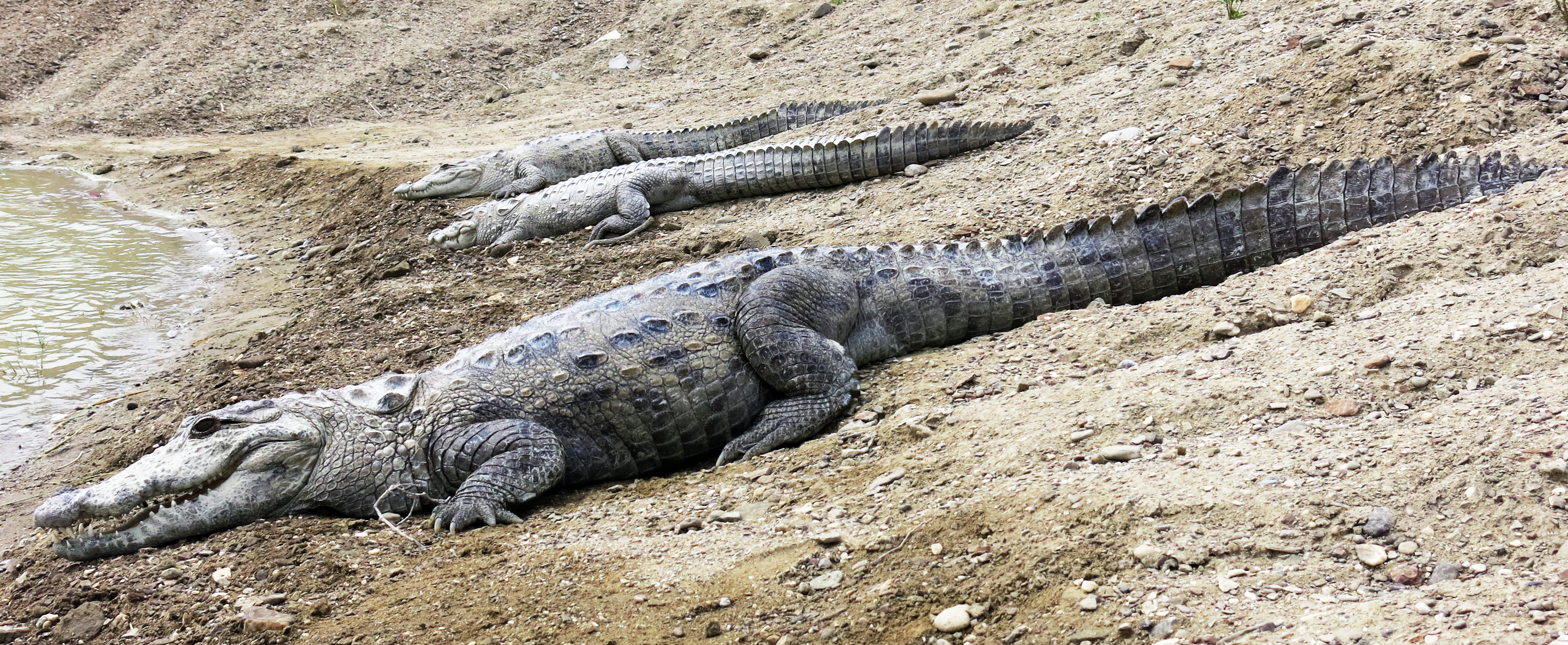
Mugger crocodile

== See also ==
- Crocodiles in India
- List of protected areas of Haryana
- List of zoos in India
- List of national parks of India
- Wildlife sanctuaries of India
- Haryana Tourism
