= Chhilchhila Wildlife Sanctuary =

Protected area in Haryana, India

- IUCN category IV (habitat/species management area)
- Location within Haryana Location within India
- Interactive map of Chhilchhila Wildlife Sanctuary
- Location: Kurukshetra district, India
- Nearest city: Bhoor Saiyda, Kurukshetra
- Coordinates: 29°56′12.45″N 76°40′50.69″E
- Area: 28.92 hectares (71.5 acres)
- Operator: Haryana Forest Department, Government of Haryana

The Chhilchhila Wildlife Sanctuary (Hindi: छिलछिला वन्यजीव अभयारण्य), also known as Seonthi Reserve Forest, is located near Kurukshetra University in Kurukshetra district in the Indian state of Haryana. Baba Rodanath Dera temple is on the periphery of the Chhilchhila Sanctuary.

The sanctuary is about 20 kilometres (12 mi) to the west of Kurukshetra University. From the Pehowa-Kurukshetra Road at Bhor Saidan, it is nearly 10 km south on Bhor Saidan - Sarsa Road. Crocodile Breeding Centre, Kurukshetra is located at Bhor Saidan on Pehowa-Kurukshetra Road.

The Chhilchhila Sanctuary is located in a depression which has a small lake created by an embankment. The sanctuary, as a staging and wintering ground of avifauna, has recorded (between April 2009 and March 2012) 57 species (33 winter migrants, 2 summer migrants and 22 resident species) of both resident and migrant wetland birds which belong to 37 genera and 16 families. Two species which have been classified Near Endangered have been identified in the sanctuary: the Oriental darter (Anhinga melanogaster) and the painted stork (Mycteria leucocephala).

== Background ==
=== History ===
Chhilchhila lake was notified as a Bird Sanctuary on 28 November 1986.

Under the provisions of the Wildlife (Protection) Act, 1972 (53 of 1972) of the Government of India, a zone of 5 kilometres (3.1 mi) surrounding the sanctuary has been declared an Eco-sensitive Zone to preserve its ecology and environment.

=== Folklore ===
According to a local legend, the lake in the sanctuary had an ancient link during the epic Mahabharata days when the Pandavas escaped to Haridwar through a tunnel under the lake.

== Sanctuary ==
The sanctuary, as a wetland which is encircled by agricultural lands, provides adequate feeding grounds and safety for the birds that visit. The farmlands with scattered trees provide foraging areas and the lake provides a food supply to the birds in the form of crustaceans and invertebrates, as well as the water plants and plankton that flourish in the lake.

=== Topography ===
The sanctuary covers an area of 28.92 hectares (71.5 acres).

Within the depression of the park there is a small shallow man-made lake which is supplied by good rainfall runoff;) it is covered with marshy vegetation and its depth varies from 4.5 metres (15 ft) in the monsoon months to 1.8–2.7 metres (5 ft 11 in – 8 ft 10 in) during the summer. Within this lake there are several platforms and also mounds covered with bushes and some trees. The area around the lake is farmland.

The sanctuary experiences three climatic seasons: summer (March–June), monsoon (July–September) and winter (October –February). Normal rainfall is an average of 582 millimetres (22.9 in) per year. Temperatures experienced in the sanctuary are a maximum of 45 °C (113 °F) in the summer and a low of 30 °C (86 °F) during winter.

=== Flora ===
Dry deciduous type vegetation is dominant in the sanctuary. The tree species identified are the: Acacia arabica, Azadirachta indica, Prosopis cineraria, eucalyptus, Ficus benghalensis, Ziziphus jujuba, Prosopis juliflora, Cassia tora, Ficus religiosa, Dalbergia sissoo. Small and medium-sized woody plants found are Capparis decidua, Calotropis procera, Adhatoda vasica, Alhagi maurorum and Xanthium strumarium. Weeds have also been noted in the sanctuary and these are Achyranthes aspera, Amaranthus spinosus, Boerhavia diffusa, Chenopodium ambrosioides , Malvastrum, and Parthenium. Some of the aquatic plant species recorded are Azolla, Cyperus, Hydrilla, and Typha.

=== Avifauna ===
The wintering migrant birds which flock to the sanctuary were recorded at different periods during the winter months. The early arrivals in October were gadwall (Aythya ferina), northern pintail (Anas acuta), northern shoveller (Anas clypeata), common teal (Anas crecca), common pochard (Aythya ferina), and common coot (Fulica atra). The birds recorded during November were mallard (Anas platyrhynchos), Indian spot-billed duck (Anas poecilorhyncha), and knob-billed duck (Sarkidiornis melanotos). The departure of the birds from the sanctuary was also noted in different months, towards the end of the winter season. The summer birds recorded were the lesser whistling duck (Dendrocygna javanica) and the cotton teal (Nettapus coromandelianus).

== Conservation ==
=== Threats ===
Major threats identified to the sanctuary are anthropogenic pressure involving encroachment of land, collection of firewood, grazing of cattle, and clearing of new vegetation on the borders of the wetland. During severe summer months, water reserves in the lake are inadequate to maintain the biodiversity of the environment. Improper management is also said to be causing problems.

=== Required conservation efforts ===
Due to the threats faced by the sanctuary, the conservation measures which need to be addressed are: establishing patrols to minimize disturbance when the birds visit to breed; and enhancing the water supply to the lake, which is purely rain-fed, from any nearby canal system.

== See also ==
- List of National Parks & Wildlife Sanctuaries of Haryana, India
