= Kukrail Reserve Forest =

Urban forest in India

Kukrail Reserve Forest (Hindi: कुकरैल संरक्षित वन), an urban forest created in 1950s as a plantation forest, is located about 9 km northwest from Lucknow city centre in the Uttar Pradesh state of India. It has a captive breeding and conservation center for the freshwater gharials (gavialis gangeticus), one of the 3 native species of crocodiles in India.The Kukrail river flows through it.

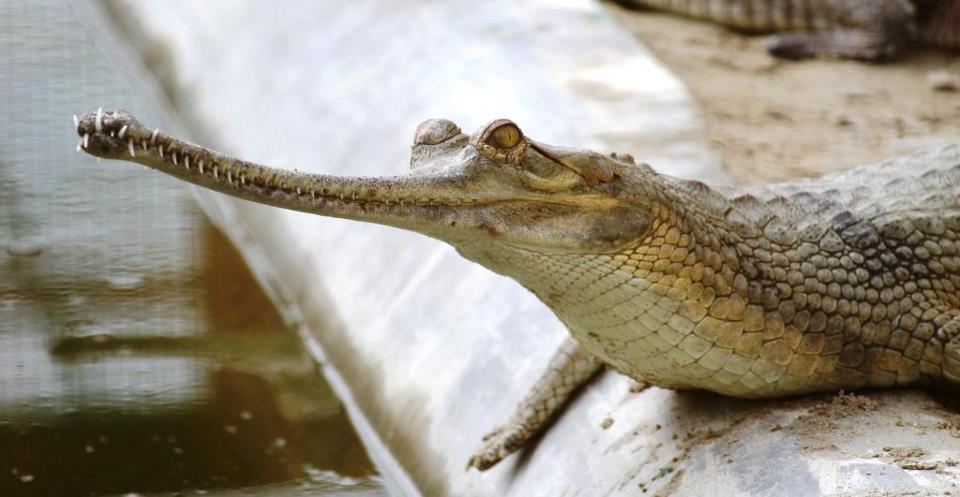
A young gharial in the breeding center at Kukrail Reserve Forest.

It is one of such 3 crocodile-breeding centers in India. Kukrail crocodile centre and the Madras Crocodile Bank Trust (breeds all 3 native crocodile species of India - freshwater muggers, freshwater gharials and salt-water crocodiles) are rated as top two most success crocodile breeding centres by National Geographic Society, the third being the Crocodile Breeding Centre at Kurukshetra (breeds only freshwater muggers).

== Background ==
=== Etymology ===
It is named after the place where it was planted in Lucknow, i.e. Kukrail Pul.

=== History ===
Forest was planted in 1950 and gharial breeding program commenced in 1978.

== Kurail urban plantation forest ==
=== Location ===
Kukrail Reserve Forest is located in Indranagar, adjacent to Mayur Residency Extension, on picnic spot road.

The forest was planted in 1950s over 5000 acres to serve as city's green lungs. Forests department has several nurseries - herbal nursery, medicinal nursery and sapling nursery - spread across the forest, which are connected by the nature trails and sell plants at low price. Sapling from the nurseries here are sent across the state for the afforestation. It is a popular picnic spot.

=== Flora ===
Forest has teak, peltophorum, acacia, prosopis juliflora, mango, eucalyptus, holoptelea integrifolia, Dates, Ficus infectoria, peepal, neem and numerous other plant species.

=== Fauna ===
The forest has over 200 species residents local and migrants birds. March to April spring season is best for bird watching.

== Conservation ==
=== Gharial conservation ===
Kukrail Gharial Rehabilitation Centre, breeds endangered gharial which is one of 3 native crocodile species of India, all 3 of which are endangered, other 2 being mugger and salt water crocodile which are not breed here. By 1975, only 300 gharials were remaining in Uttar Pradesh. Consequently, Uttar Pradesh Forest Department collected gharial eggs from the river banks, incubated, and released adult gharials in to various rivers. Kukrali captive-breeding programme for gharial is one of the two such most successful wildlife conservation programmes in the country, other being Madras Crocodile Bank Trust.

Kurail Gharial breeding center project was established in 1978 by the Uttar Pradesh forest department in collaboration with Ministry of Environment and Forests of India, after a 1975 study by the International Union for Conservation of Nature and Natural Resources (UNO) estimated that there were only 300 crocodile left in the open rivers of Uttar Pradesh.

==== Gharial breeding ====
Center has been 4 resident females and two resident male gharials for captive breeding, till 2016 total of 5410 gharial juveniles have been released into various rivers including 254 into Ganges river. Apart from breeding crocodiles in the park, crocodile eggs are also collected from the banks of Ramganga, Suheli, Girwa and Chambal rivers. The female crocodile lays eggs in April by digging holes on the river banks. The young crocodiles hatch in a period of 60 to 80 days. When young crocodiles come out of these eggs after artificial hatching at the center, they are fed and looked after till they become capable of defending themselves against other predators. The young crocodiles are then released into the waters of Chambal, Sharda, Ghaghra, Girwa, Ramganga and Ganges rivers. This programme has contributed to the improvement in the gharial's status not only in Uttar Pradesh but also in the neighbouring states of Madhya Pradesh and Rajasthan as well as has provided gharials to zoos and nature parks in Odisha, Kanpur, Delhi, West Bengal, Chennai, Bhutan, Tokyo, New York, Pakistan, and Afghanistan.

==== Gharial research ====
For the scientific study, at the time of release into the wild the juveniles are tagged with color-coded tags and unique identification numbers which can be later seen with the help of binoculars. Some gharials were released with high-frequency (VHF) radio tags into the Ghaghra River for better tracking for the scientific study. Centre also uses biologging to research the underwater behaviour of free-ranging gharials in which a lightweight camera is tied to the head of gharial at the time of release which detaches from the gharial after 4 hours; it collects diving depths, swimming speeds and frequency of movements, etc. Detached cameras are collected for the research.

=== Mugger rehabilitation ===
Mugger (crocodylus palustris) rescued from the surrounding area are kept here to provide veterinary care until they are healed enough to be released back in the rivers.

=== Turtle conservation ===
Softshell turtle conservation, in collaboration with Turtle Survival Alliance (TSA), was established as part of the Ganga Action Plan which conducts scientific research and develops broad based inclusive colonies of all endangered turtles.

== See also ==
- Mugger
- Salt water crocodile
- Crocodile Breeding Centre, Kurukshetra for mugger
- Madras Crocodile Bank Trust for gharial, mugger and salt water crocodiles
