= Kukrail River =

River in India

Kukrail is a left-bank small tributary of the Gomti River which merges with it in Lucknow, Uttar Pradesh.

== Course ==
The river originates from a well near Dasaur Baba Pond in Asti village in Bakshi Ka Talab of Lucknow. It then travels around 6km through the Kukrail Reserve Forest. It flows around 28km-long course before it joins the Gomti river.

== History ==
According to local folklore, the river was originated about 200 years ago. It was first documented in a 1904 gazetteer. In 1960, it's water level reached 113.2 metres, which lead to the construction of embankments along the river in 1962. In 1980, the land between the Kukrail and other tributaries of Gomti, called the Municipal Sled Farm, was given to the Lucknow Development Authority (LDA) for development.

== Protection ==
In 2024, a 50 metres strip along the Kukrail river was declared flood plain. The Lucknow Development Authority conducted a massive demolition drive in Akbarnagar area as a part of this, where over 1,800 illegal structures were removed.
