= Gharial conservation in Pakistan =

The gharial (Gavialis gangeticus) is classified as a critically endangered species. Its last sighting in Pakistan was reported in 1985. However, there have been recent reports indicating that the gharial has been sighted once again, specifically in the Punjab region of Pakistan. After reported sightings, the "Gharial Wildlife Sanctuary" has been designated as a protected area under the Punjab Protected Areas Act of 2020.

== Recent sightings ==
In May 2023, sightings of the gharial were shared on social media, prompting the World Wildlife Fund (WWF) Pakistan's wildlife team to conduct an investigation. Following their survey, they confirmed the presence of gharials in the area, including juvenile individuals. This event marked the first verified sighting of the species in Pakistan after a presumed absence of three decades.

A survey team has confirmed the presence of about 10 gharials, including six baby crocodiles, in the Ganda Singh Wala area of the river. The team spotted a gharial measuring roughly 14 feet in length and two feet in width. There is speculation that these crocodiles might have migrated from India after the floods last year and have now started to reproduce in this area. Experts have noted that gharials mainly feed on fish and do not pose a threat to humans.

== Conservation efforts ==
In response to these sightings, WWF-Pakistan is collaborating with the Forestry, Wildlife and Fisheries department, Punjab and other partners to enhance conservation efforts for the gharial. The primary objective is to guarantee the newly discovered population not only survives but also thrives in its habitat through dedicated conservation measures.

The conservation plan encompasses onsite monitoring in collaboration with security authorities. The main emphasis will be on executing efficient conservation measures and safeguarding the gharials' habitat. This involves ensuring appropriate water quantity and quality, as well as managing ongoing fishing activities to protect their habitat effectively.

== Reintroduction program ==
Pakistan has formally requested the transfer of hundreds of gharial crocodiles from Nepal as part of an initiative to reintroduce this species. The government aims to reintroduce gharials into the Nara Canal wetland system to enhance its biodiversity. Additionally, this reintroduction program is anticipated to generate income for local communities through wildlife tourism, presenting a potential economic opportunity tied to conservation efforts.

== Challenges ==
While there is local support for the reintroduction of gharials in Pakistan, the request made to Nepal is confronted by several challenges. These hurdles encompass financial constraints and reservations regarding whether Pakistan has adequately addressed the conditions that initially resulted in the local extinction of the gharial species. These concerns pose obstacles to the successful transfer and reintroduction of gharials from Nepal to Pakistan.
