= Bhor Saidan =

Bhor Saidan Bhour Saidan and Bhoor Saiydan
- village
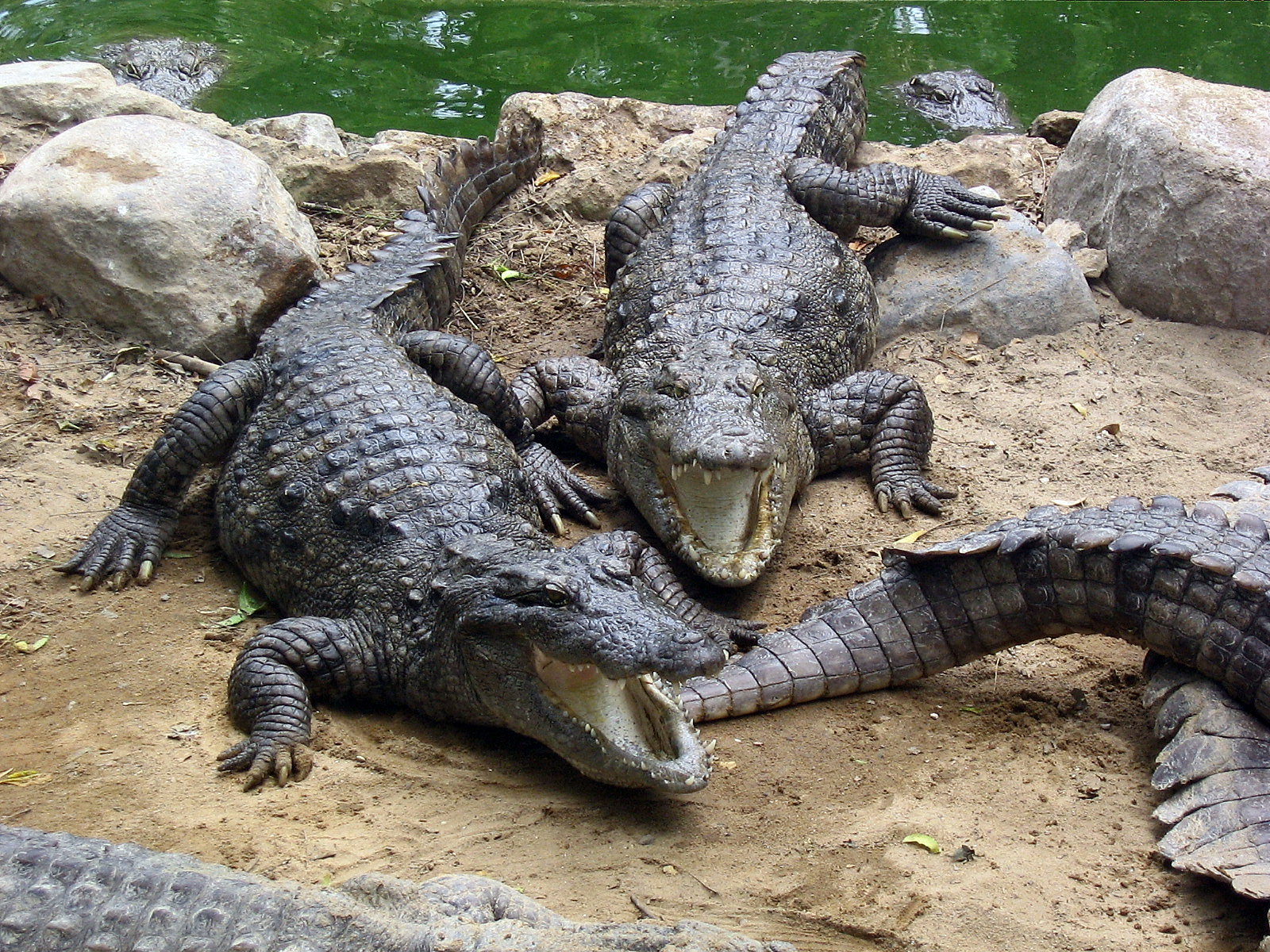
- Crocodiles Sanctuary At Bhor Saidan

- Location in Haryana, India Bhor Saidan (India)
- Coordinates: 29°57′43″N 76°41′49″E
- Country: India
- State: Haryana
- District: Kurukshetra district
- Established: Vedic period ( c. 1500 – c. 500 BCE)
- Founder: Bhurisrava (Kaurava hero)

Government
  - Type: Panchayati raj
  - Body: Gram panchayat

Languages
  - Official: Hindi
- Time zone: UTC+5:30 (IST)
- Website: www.haryanaforest.gov.in

The Bhor Saidan, formerly also spelled Bhour Saidan and Bhoor Saiydan, is a village located 22 km from Kurukshetra and 13 km west of Thanesar on the Kurukshetra-Pehowa road near Bhureeshwar Temple, one of the pilgrimage sites on the river bed of now extinct Sarasvati River in Kurukshetra in the Indian state of Haryana. It is also the location of Crocodile Breeding Centre, Kurukshetra.

== Etymology ==
Bhor Saidan village was named after Kaurava hero Bhurisrava of Mahabharta, son of Somadutta the king of Vaishali.

== Bhor Saidan Archeology mound ==
Bhor Saidan sits on an ancient archeological mound, on the banks of dried up river bed of Sarasvati River that dried up due to the movement of tectonic plates. Curator Archaeologist of Shrikrishna Museum in Kurushketra, Rajesh Purohit, discovered Painted Grey Ware culture (1200 BCE to 600 BCE)) pottery from the Vedic period of Mahabharata.

Chairman of Kurukshetra University's geology department, Rk Chaudhari, who collaborated with Oil and Natural Gas Corporation in 2006 to conducted a study of Bhor Saidan's course of Sarasvati river, explains that the sedimentary samples from Bhor Saidan and other sites along the Sarwasati river were similar to with those found in the upper Himalayas. Government of Haryana is working on implementing the plan to make the Sarasvati river flow again, by diverting the water from the Somb river, along Sarasvati river's ancient route from Adi Badri (Haryana), where the river emerges from Himalayas, to Pehowa via Bhor Saidan.

== Bhurishrava Tirtha ==
Bhor Saidan Tirath with Bhurirava kund (pond named after Bhurisrava) who was killed by the Satyaki in Mahabharata war, is an ancient Tirth (sacred place) within 48 kos parikrama of Kurukshetra pilgrimage circuit of Hindu tirths.

== Crocodiles Sanctuary At Bhor Saidan ==
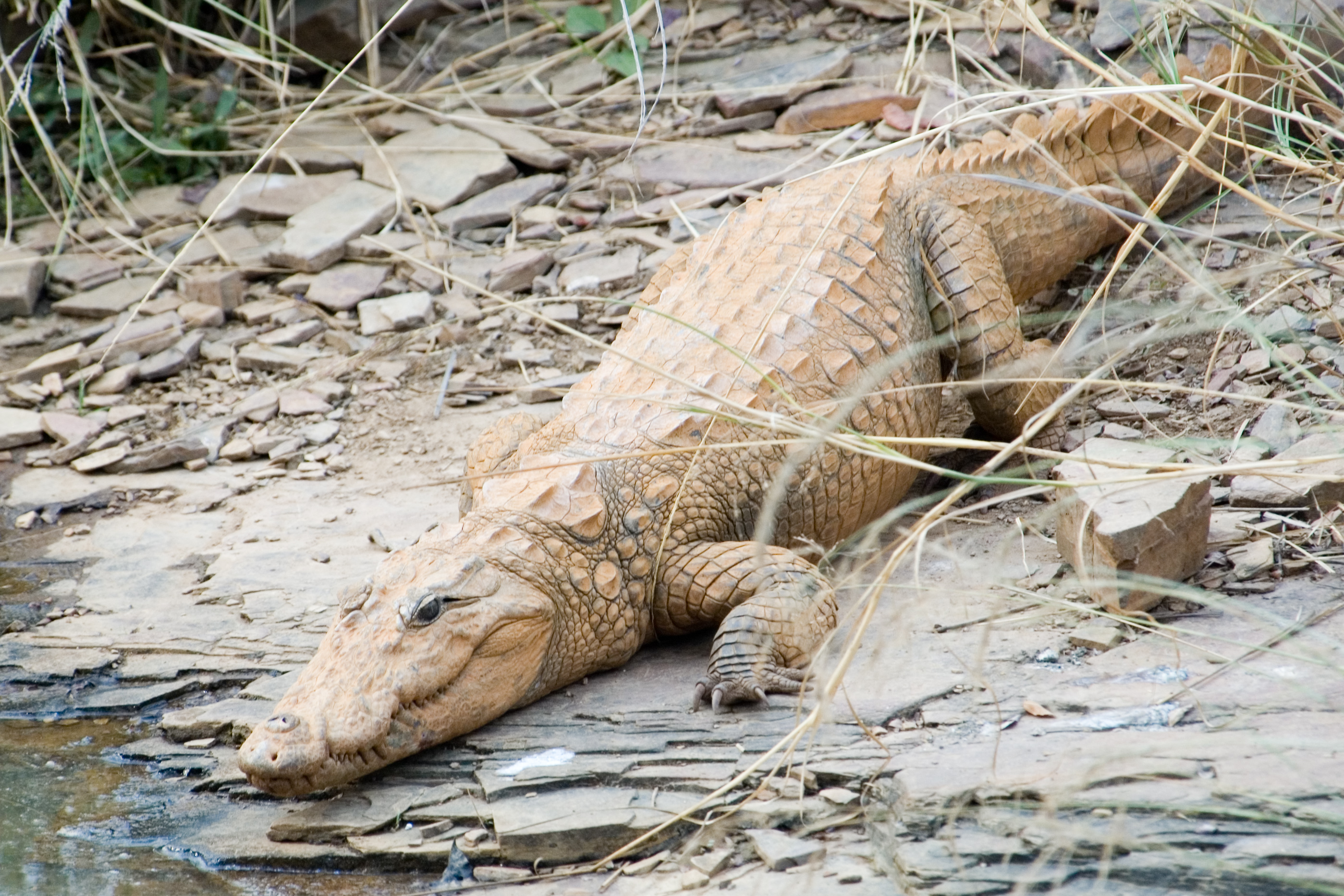
Mugger crocodile

Crocodile Breeding Centre, Kurukshetra origin lies in the fact that Mugger crocodiles are believed to have been brought by one of the Mahants of the nearby temple of the Bhor Saidan Tirath in the 1930s. In 1980, Forests Department, Haryana took over the breeding centre and the Bhor Saidan village panchayat gave 15+ acre land to the Government of Haryana to start the breeding centre. Periphery has been fenced and a mound inside the pond was created to watch the crocodiles from the close range.

== Demography ==
As per the 2011 Census of India, the village has a population of 2289; 1234 males and 1055 females in 422 families, with a literacy rate of 71.15%, 78.63% literate male and 62.72% literate female.

== See also ==
- Crocodiles in India
