= Ghara =

South Asian earthen pot

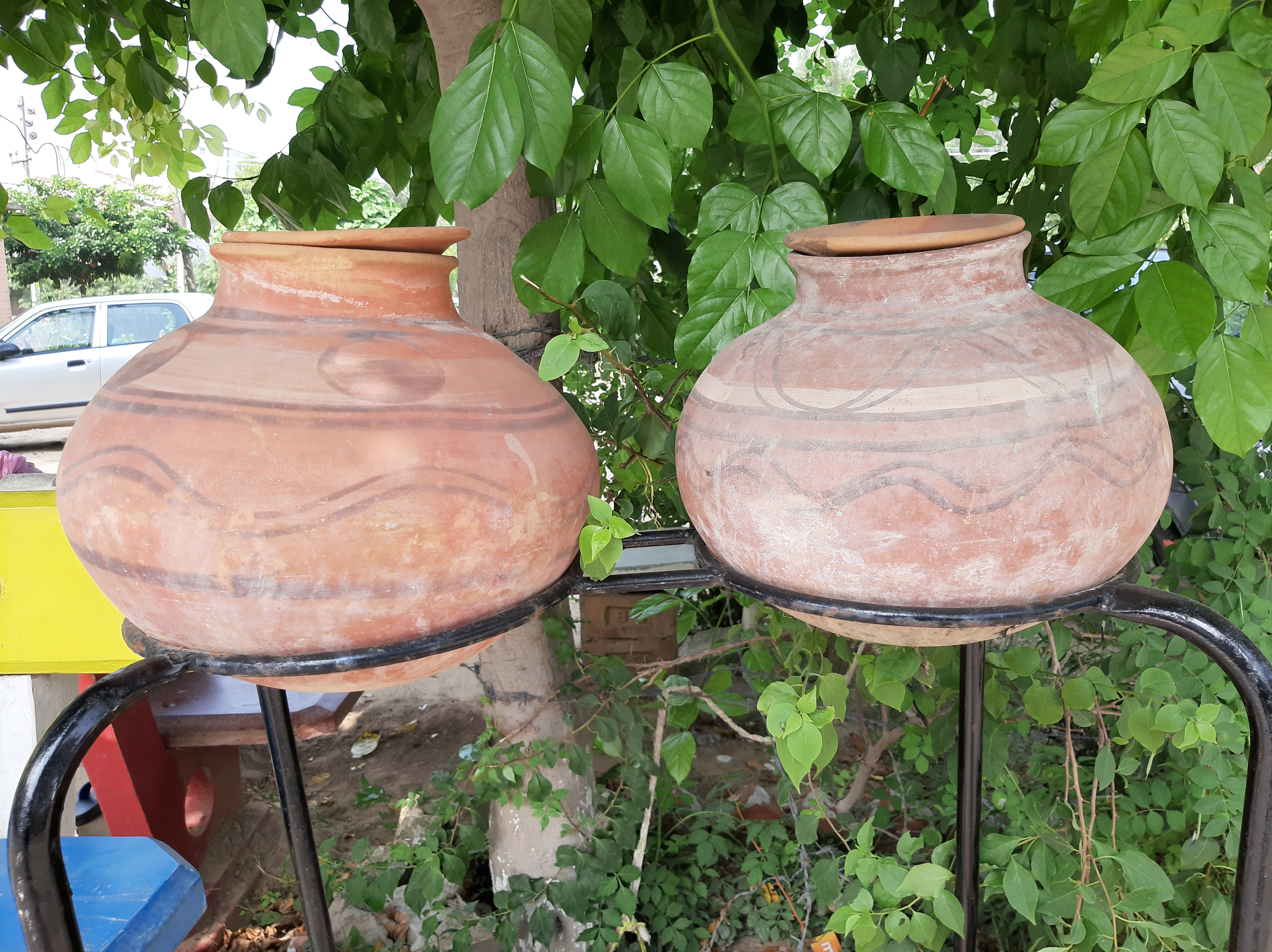
The typical shape of a ghara

Ghara is an earthen pot made in the Indian subcontinent. It is used for storing drinking water and keeping it cool.

The word ghara has cognates in Pahari, Bengali and Odia languages that can all be traced to the Sanskrit word ghaṭa meaning pot. It is spelled in Hindi: घड़ा; in Nepali: घड़ा ghaṛā; in Urdu: گھڑا; in Saraiki: دِلّا and in Punjabi: ਘਡ਼ਾ.

The word ghara is also used for the hollow bulbous protuberance on the snout of mature male gharials (Gavialis gangeticus), as it is shaped like a ghara. This protuberance enables them to emit a hissing sound that can be heard 75 m (246 ft) away.
