= Biologging =

Biologging is the use of tags attached to animals to record aspects of their behaviour, physiology or environment.

== Description ==
Biologging tags can this can just feature the location of the animal, such as with GPS animal tracking. However, biologging typically has a focus on learning about other features besides the animal's location.

Many sensor types can be used. Examples include temperature, accelerometers or microphones. Regardless of the type, the biologger sensors themselves must be of a certain minute size as to not disturb the animal being tagged.
