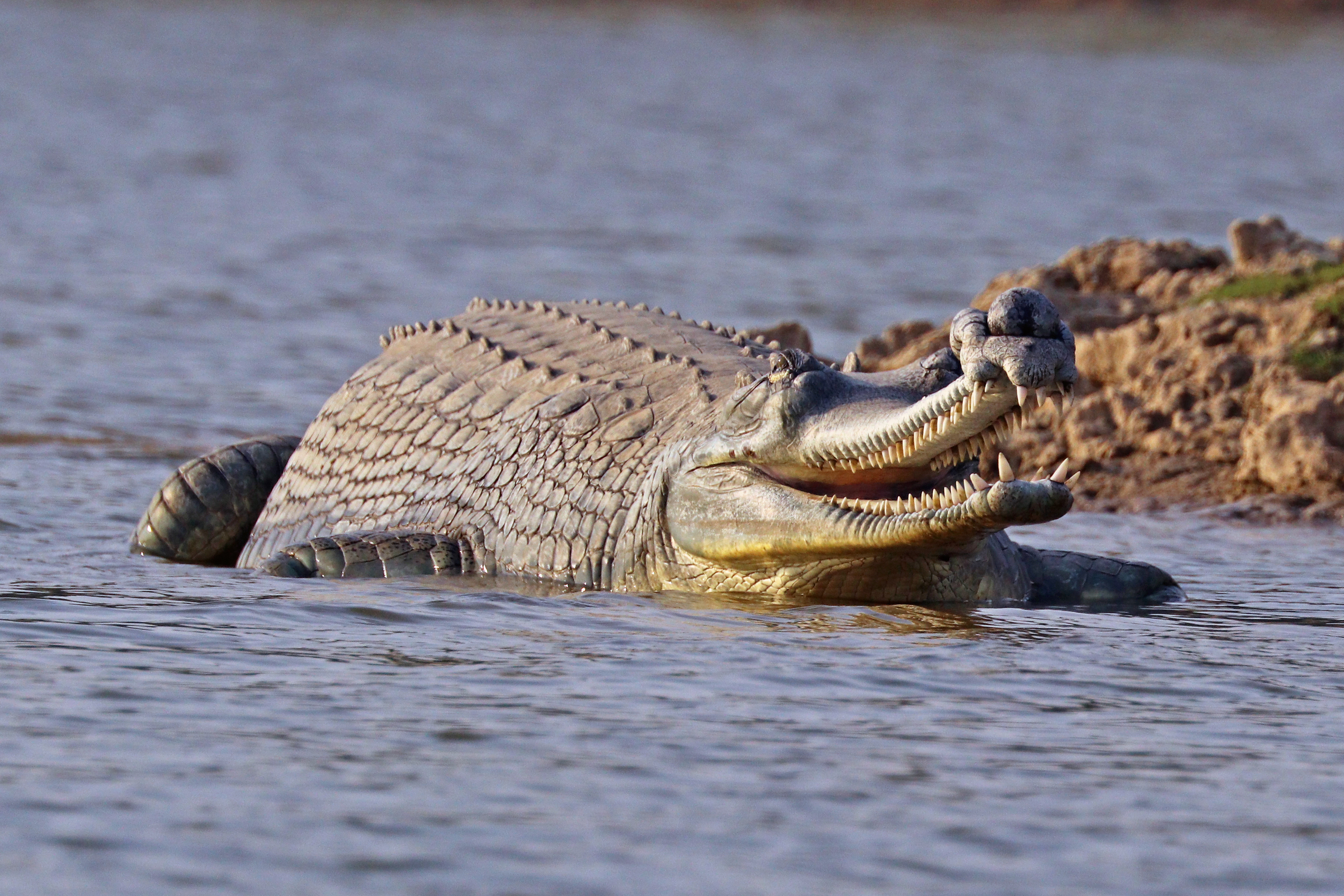
- Male gharial
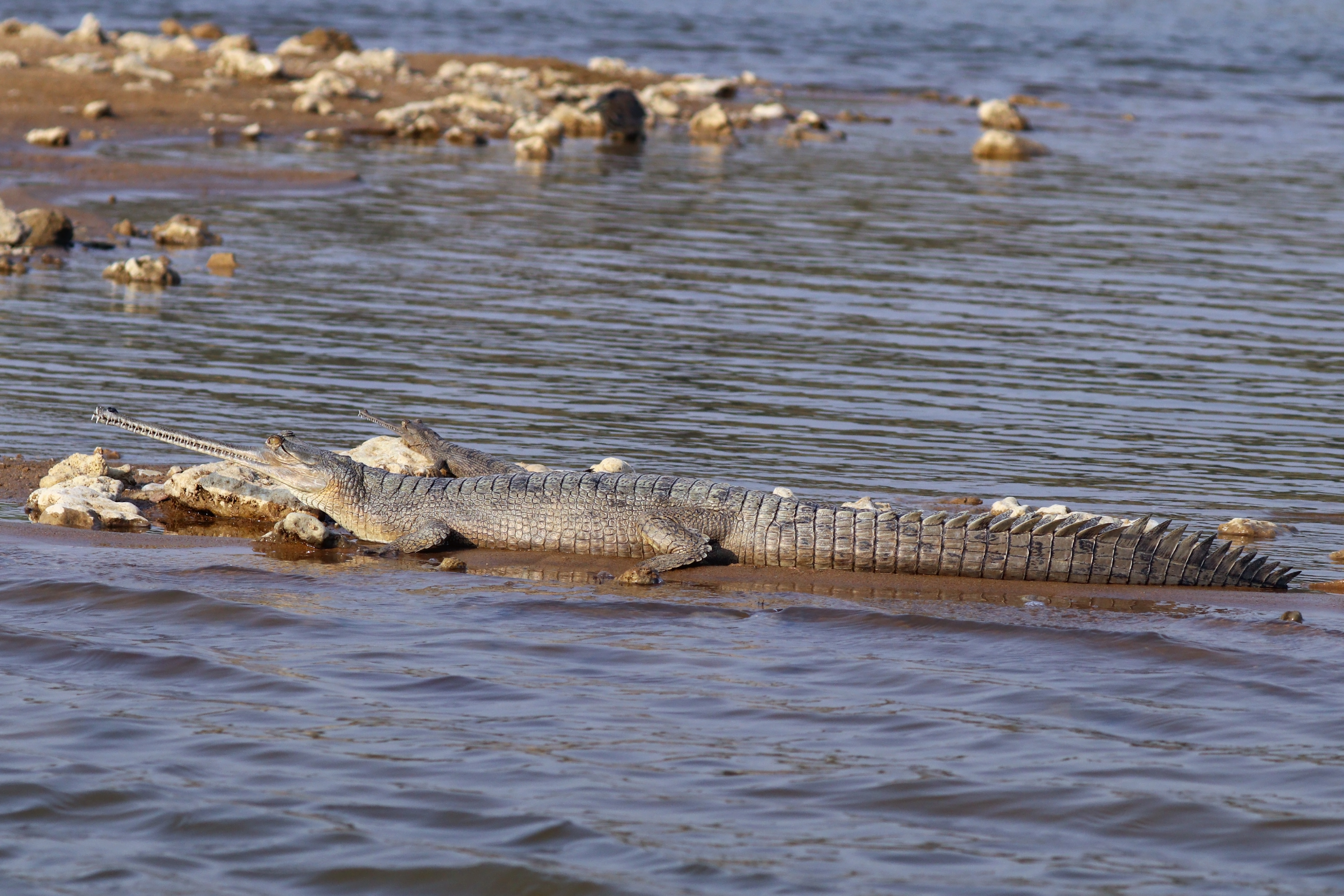
- Female and juvenile gharial

Conservation status
- Critically Endangered (IUCN 3.1)
- CITES Appendix I

Scientific classification
- Kingdom: Animalia
- Phylum: Chordata
- Class: Reptilia
- Order: Crocodylia
- Family: Gavialidae
- Genus: Gavialis
- Species: G. gangeticus

Binomial name
- Gavialis gangeticus (Gmelin, 1789)
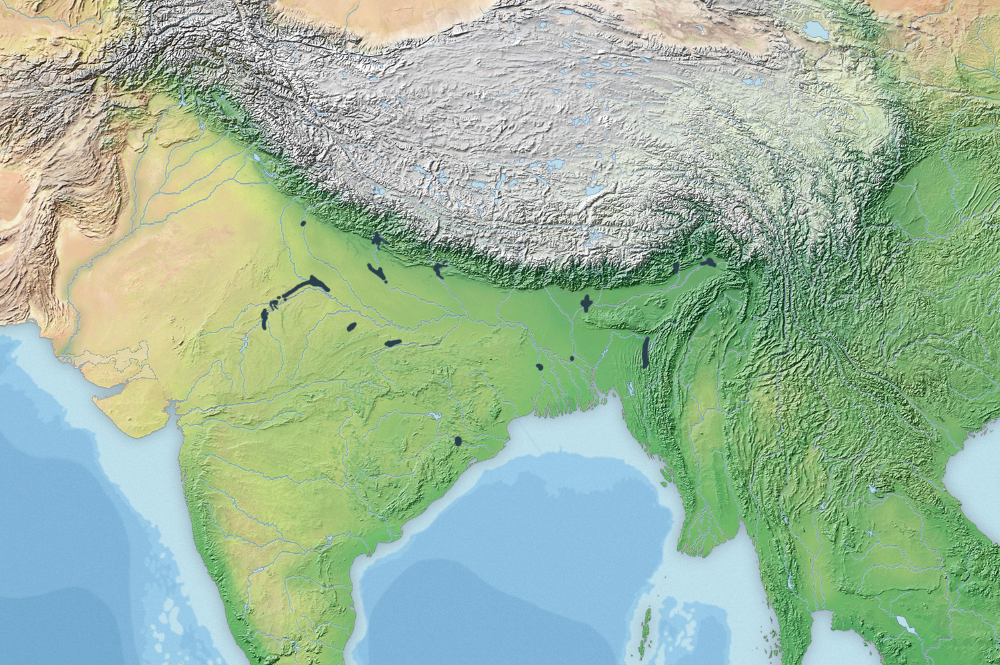
- Range of gharial as of 2019 in black

Synonyms
- Lacerta gangetica Gmelin, 1789; Crocodilus gavial Bonnaterre, 1789; Crocodilus longirostris Schneider, 1801; Crocodilus arctirostris Daudin, 1802; Crocodilus gangeticus and C. tenuirostris Cuvier, 1807; Rhamphostoma Wagler, 1830; †Gharialis hysudricus Lydekker, 1886

= Gharial =

Gharial Temporal range: Pleistocene–Present, 2.6–0 Ma

Crocodilian native to the Indian subcontinent

The gharial (Gavialis gangeticus), also known as gavial or fish-eating crocodile, is a crocodilian in the family Gavialidae and among the longest of all living crocodilians. Mature females are 2.6–4.5 m (8.5–14.8 ft) long, and males 3–6 m (9.8–19.7 ft). Adult males have a distinct boss at the end of the snout, which resembles an earthenware pot known as a ghara, hence the name "gharial". The gharial is well adapted to catching fish because of its long, narrow snout and 110 sharp, interlocking teeth.

The gharial probably evolved in the northern Indian subcontinent. Fossil gharial remains were excavated in Pliocene deposits in the Sivalik Hills and the Narmada River valley. It currently inhabits rivers in the plains of the northern part of the Indian subcontinent. It is the most thoroughly aquatic crocodilian, and leaves the water only for basking and building nests on moist sandbanks. Adults mate at the end of the cold season. Females congregate in spring to dig nests, in which they lay 20–95 eggs. They guard the nests and the young, which hatch before the onset of the monsoon. The hatchlings stay and forage in shallow water during their first year, but move to sites with deeper water as they grow.

The wild gharial population has declined drastically since the 1930s and is limited to only 2% of its historical range today. Conservation programmes initiated in India and Nepal focused on reintroducing captive-bred gharials since the early 1980s. Loss of habitat because of sand mining and conversion to agriculture, depletion of fish resources and detrimental fishing methods continue to threaten the population. It has been listed as critically endangered on the IUCN Red List since 2007.

The oldest known depictions of the gharial are about 4,000 years old and were found in the Indus Valley. Hindus regard it as the vehicle of the river deity Gaṅgā. Local people living near rivers attributed mystical and healing powers to the gharial, and used some of its body parts as ingredients of indigenous medicine.

== Etymology ==
The name 'gharial' is derived from the Hindustani word 'ghara' for an earthen pot, in reference to the nasal protuberance on the adult male's snout. It is also called 'gavial'. The name 'fish-eating crocodile' is a translation of its Bengali name 'mecho kumhir', with 'mecho' being derived from 'māch' meaning fish and 'kumhir' meaning crocodile. The name 'Indian gharial' has occasionally been used for gharial populations in India.

== Taxonomy ==
Lacerta gangetica was the scientific name proposed by Johann Friedrich Gmelin in 1789. Gmelin followed Carl Linnaeus who proposed Lacerta in 1758 to include other crocodiles and various lizards known at the time.

The gharial was placed in the genus Crocodilus by subsequent naturalists:

- Crocodilus gavial by Pierre Joseph Bonnaterre in 1789.
- Crocodilus longirostris by Johann Gottlob Theaenus Schneider in 1801.
- Crocodilus arctirostris by François Marie Daudin in 1802.
- Longirostres was a subgroup proposed by Georges Cuvier in 1807 for crocodiles with a long snout. He placed Crocodilus gangeticus with the type locality "Ganges" and Crocodilus tenuirostris without locality into this group.

The generic name Gavialis was proposed by Nicolaus Michael Oppel in 1811 for crocodiles with a cylindrical-shaped back. He placed this genus in the family Crocodilini. Rhamphostoma was proposed by Johann Georg Wagler in 1830 who considered this genus to contain two species, Crocodilus gangeticus and C. tenuirostris.

The family name Gavialidae was proposed by Arthur Adams in 1854 with Gavialis as the only genus in this family. Gavialis gangetica was the scientific name used by Albert Günther in 1864 who considered L. gangetica, C. longirostris and C. tenuirostris as synonyms and Gavialis a monotypic taxon. John Edward Gray reviewed zoological specimens in the collection of the Natural History Museum, London. He also considered the gharial monotypic in 1869. He placed it in the family Gavialidae together with the false gharial (Tomistoma schlegelii) because both have long, slender jaws and similar dentition.

Gharialis hysudricus proposed by Richard Lydekker in 1886 was based on a fossil skull from the Sivalik Hills that was larger than gharial fossil skulls known at the time. This name is considered to be a junior synonym of Gavialis gangeticus.

== Evolution ==
The evolution of the gharial and its relationship with and divergence from other crocodilians have been a subject of controversy. Some authors assumed that the gharial evolved earlier than the other crocodilians because of its distinct skull shape and dentition, indicating a more advanced level of specialization. Others suggested that it evolved much later than other crocodilians because of its low levels of blood protein divergence. As it shares this trait with the false gharial, it was suggested that they form a sister group. In contrast, it was suggested that the gharial and all the other crocodilians form a sister group as the structure of its tail muscles is unique. Sequencing of a ribosomal segment of mitochondrial DNAs of gharial and false gharial revealed that they share 22 unique nucleotides, a similarity of 94%, supporting the view that they are sister taxa. Analyses of nuclear gene sequences of both species also support the view that they are sister taxa. Molecular genetics and tip dating studies indicates a genetic divergence between the gharial and false gharial in the Eocene about 38 million years ago.

The genus Gavialis probably originated in the region of India and Pakistan in the Early Miocene. Fossil gharial remains excavated in the Sivalik Hills of Haryana and Himachal Pradesh are dated to between the Pliocene and the Early Pleistocene. Fossil gharial remains were also found at two sites in the Ayeyarwady River valley in central Myanmar, which are dated to the Late Pleistocene. During the Quaternary, Gavialis dispersed as far as Java via the Siva–Malayan route, which did not require saltwater crossings. Fossil remains of Gavialis bengawanicus found on Java were dated to the Early Pleistocene. G. bengawanicus fossils found in Thailand's Nakhon Ratchasima Province support the hypothesis of gharial dispersal through riverine systems. It represents the only valid extinct Gavialis species.

=== Phylogeny ===
The below cladogram of the major extant crocodile groups is based on the latest molecular studies and shows the gharial's close relationship to the false gharial, and how the gavialids and crocodiles are more closely related than the alligatoroids:

- Crocodilia
  - Alligatoridae
    - Caimaninae
      - - Caiman
        - Melanosuchus
      - Paleosuchus
    - Alligatorinae
      Alligator
  - Longirostres
    - Crocodylidae
      - Crocodylus
      - - Mecistops
        - Osteolaemus
    - Gavialidae
      - Gavialis
      - Tomistoma

Here is a more detailed cladogram that shows the gharial's proposed placement within Gavialidae, including extinct members:

- Gavialidae
  - - - - - - - - Gharial
                - Gavialis bengawanicus†
              - Gavialis browni†
            - Gryposuchus colombianus†
          - Ikanogavialis†
        - - Gryposuchus pachakamue†
          - Piscogavialis†
      - Harpacochampsa†
    - - - Toyotamaphimeia†
        - Penghusuchus†
      - Gavialosuchus†
  - - Tomistoma lusitanicum†
    - False gharial Tomistoma schlegelii

== Characteristics ==
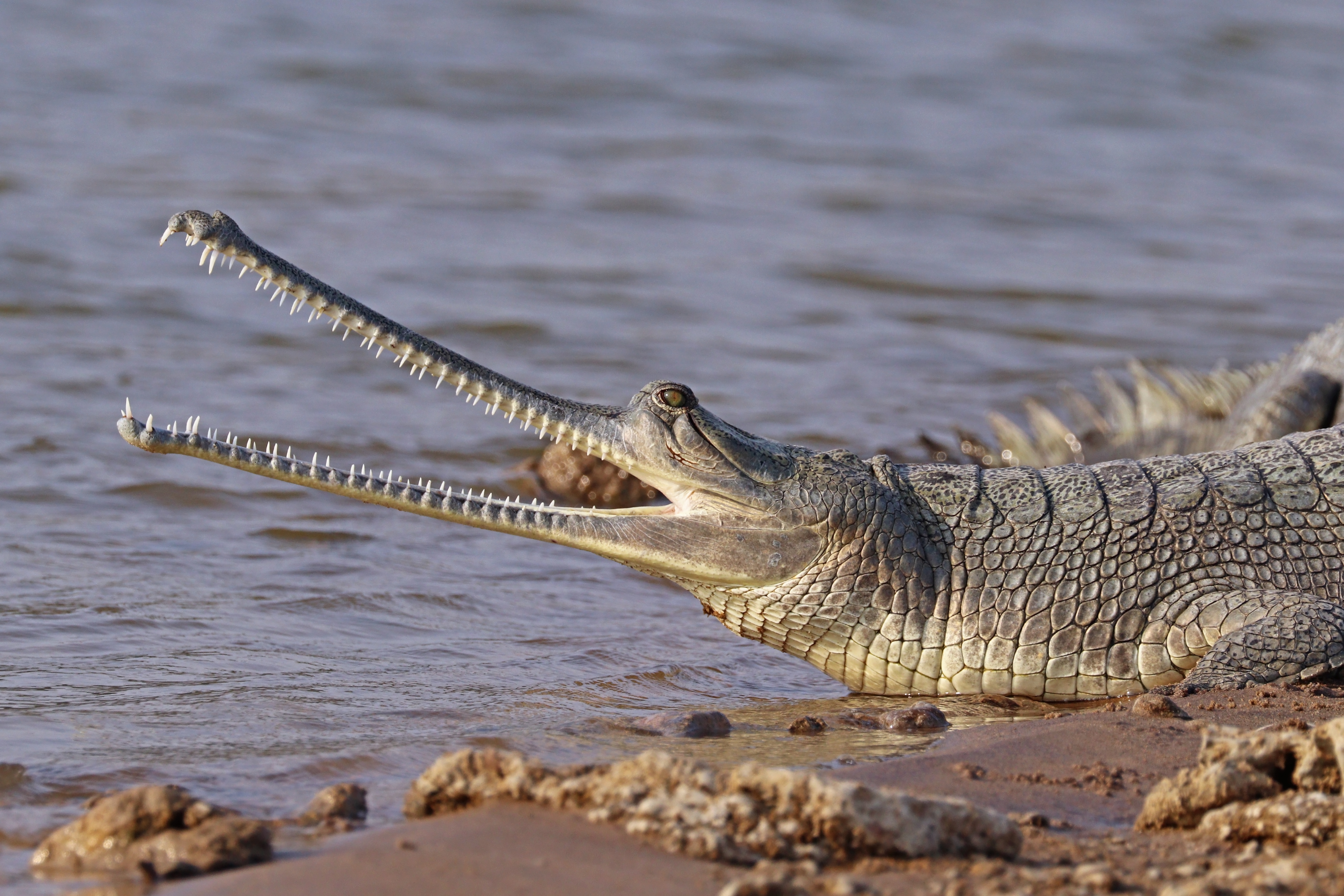
Adult female gharial

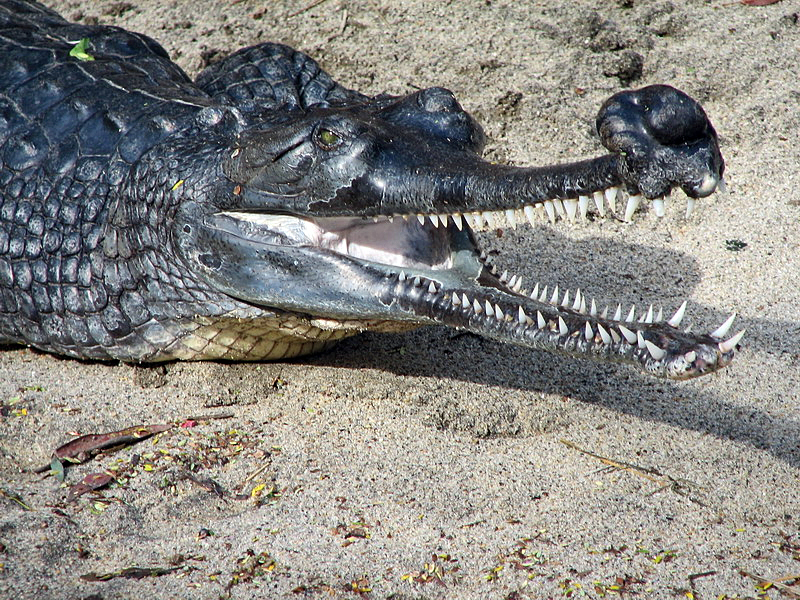
Adult male gharial

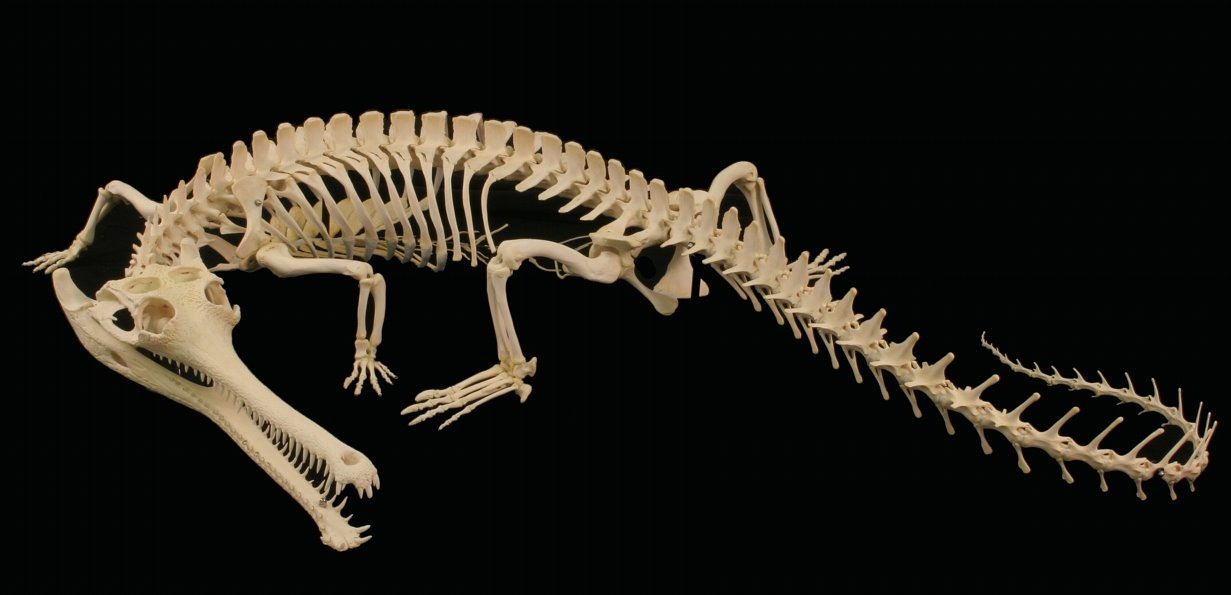
Gharial skeleton

The gharial is olive-coloured, with adults being darker than young, which have dark brown cross bands and speckles. Its back turns almost black at 20 years of age, but its belly is yellowish-white. It has four transverse rows of two scales on the neck, which continue along the back. Scutes on the head, neck and back form a single continuous plate composed of 21 to 22 transverse series, and four longitudinal series. Scutes on the back are bony, but softer and feebly keeled on the sides. The outer edges of the forearms, legs, and feet have crests jutting out; fingers and toes are partly webbed.

Its snout is very long and narrow, widened at the end, and has 27 to 29 upper teeth and 25 or 26 lower teeth on each side. The front teeth are the largest. The first, second, and third lower jaw teeth fit into spaces in the upper jaw. The extremely long mandibular symphysis extends to the 23rd or 24th tooth. The snout of adult gharials is 3.5 times longer than the width of the skull's base. Because of this long snout, the gharial is especially adapted to catching and eating fish. The nasal bones are rather short and widely spaced from the premaxillae. The jugal bone is raised. It becomes proportionally thicker with age. Two individuals in the weight range of 103–121 kg (227–267 lb) had an average measured bite force of 1,784–2,006 N (401–451 lb_{f}).

Male gharials develop a hollow bulbous nasal protuberance at the tip of the snout upon reaching sexual maturity. This protuberance resembles an earthen pot known locally as "ghara". The male's ghara starts growing over the nostrils at an age of 11.5 years and measures about 5 cm × 6 cm × 3.5 cm (2.0 in × 2.4 in × 1.4 in) at an age of 15.5 years. It enables the males to emit a hissing sound that can be heard 75 m (246 ft) away; this sound is thought to attract females. The gharial is the only living crocodilian with such visible sexual dimorphism. Mature male gharials have larger skulls than females, exceeding a basal length of 715 mm (28.1 in) and a width of 287 mm (11.3 in).

Female gharials reach sexual maturity at a body length of 2.6 m (8.5 ft) and grow up to 4.5 m (15 ft). Males mature at a body length of at least 3 m (9.8 ft) and grow up to a length of 6 m (20 ft). Adult males weigh about 160 kg (350 lb) on average, but large males can reach a weight of 600–750 kg (1,320–1,650 lb). The gharial is among the largest living crocodilians, with the heaviest recorded male weighing 977 kg (2,154 lb). A 6.55 m (21.5 ft) long gharial was claimed to have been killed in the Ghaghara River in Faizabad in August 1920, though no reliable measurements were taken. Male gharials with an alleged length of 7.16 to 9.14 m (23.5 to 30.0 ft) were sighted around the turn of the 20th century in Indian rivers. Overall, the gharial is less massive when compared to other crocodilians of similar length; a 4.9 m (16 ft) long gharial weighed around 560 kg (1,230 lb), while a 4.8 m (16 ft) long Nile crocodile weighed 680 kg (1,500 lb).

== Distribution and habitat ==
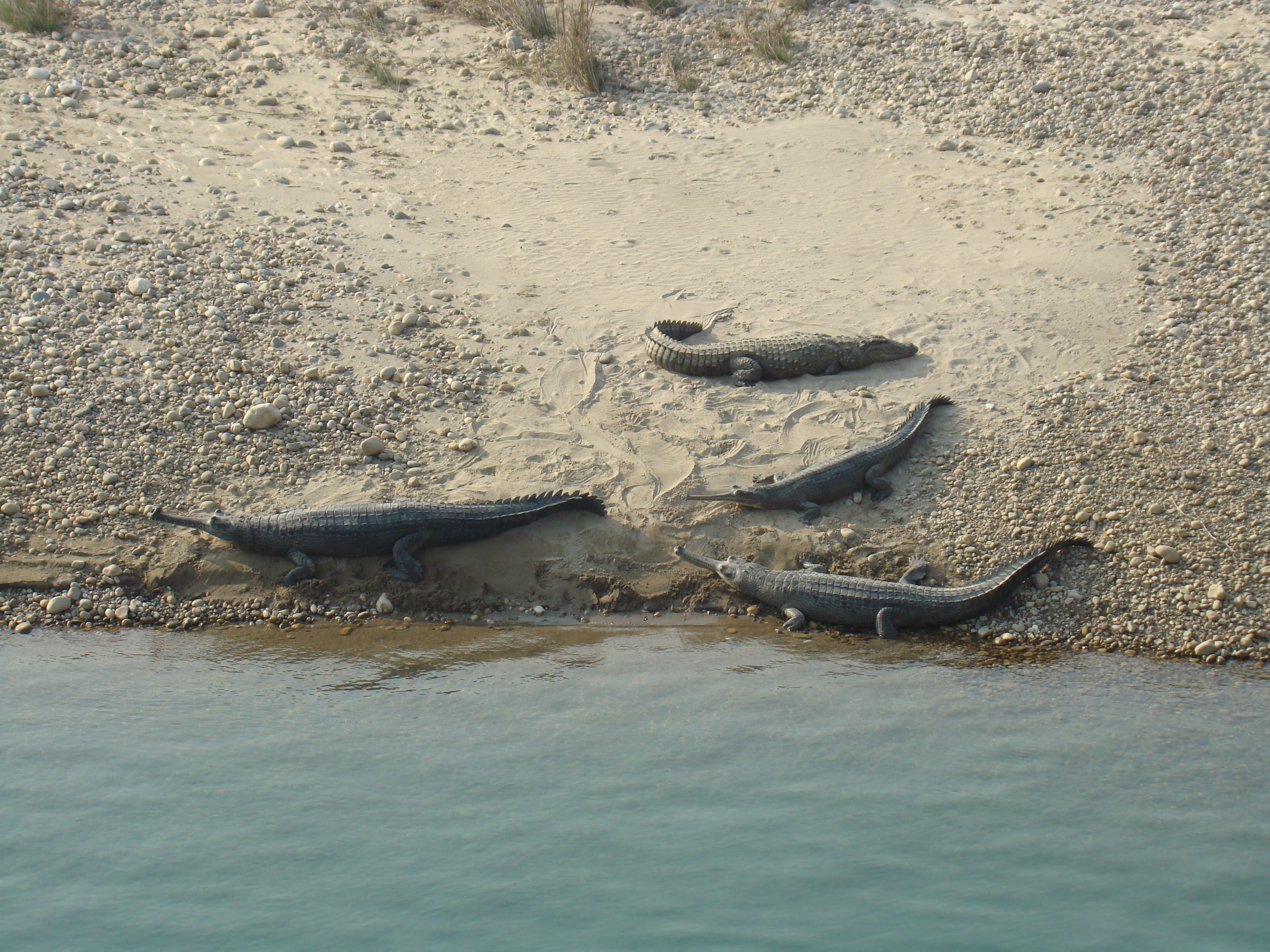
Gharials in Karnali River, Nepal, with a mugger crocodile in the back

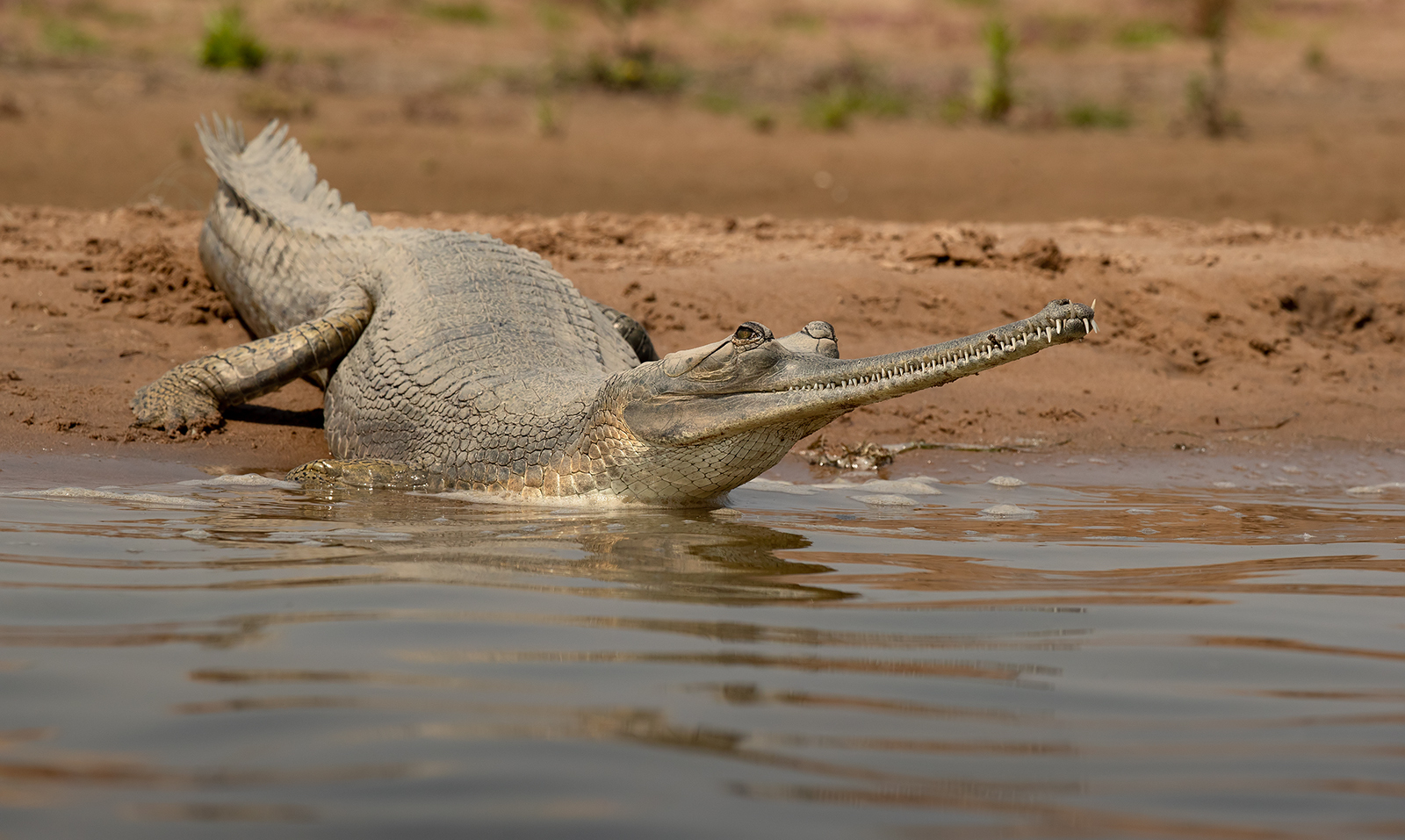
Gharial in National Chambal Sanctuary

The gharial once thrived in all the major river systems of the northern Indian subcontinent, from the Indus River in Pakistan, the Ganges in India, the Brahmaputra River in northeastern India and Bangladesh to the Irrawaddy River in Myanmar. In the early 20th century, it was considered common in the Indus River and its Punjabi tributaries. By the early 1980s, it was almost extinct in the Indus. During surveys in 2008 and 2009, no gharial was sighted in the river. It was also present in India's Godavari River but was hunted to extinction between the late 1940s and the 1960s. It was considered extinct in the Koshi River since 1970. In the 1940s, it was numerous in the Barak River in Assam, which held big fish at the time including golden mahseer (Tor putitora). A few individuals were also sighted in tributaries of the Barak River in Assam, Mizoram and Manipur up to 1988, but surveys were not carried out. In 1927, a gharial was shot in the Shweli River in Myanmar, a tributary of the Ayeyawady River. This is the only authenticated record in the country attesting the survival of gharials into the 20th century. Whether gharials still live in the Shweli River today is possible but remained unclear in 2012.

By 1976, its global range had decreased to only 2% of its historical range, and fewer than 200 gharials were estimated to survive. It is locally extinct in Bhutan and Myanmar.

In Pakistan, fishermen reported several sightings of adult and juvenile gharials in the Sutlej River in 2023; a 70 km (43 mi) strip of the river was notified as Gharial Wildlife Sanctuary in July 2023. A survey in 2023 in an area of 170 km^{2} (66 sq mi) along a 5 km (3.1 mi) river stretch revealed two breeding sites and 27 individuals.

Since the early 1980s, the population has been reinforced with captive-bred gharials that were released into wild habitats in India and Nepal. As of 2019, the global population was estimated to comprise at maximum 900 individuals, including about 600 mature adults in six major subpopulations along 1,100 km (680 mi) of river courses and another 50 mature adults in eight minor subpopulations along 1,200 km (750 mi) of river courses.

In Nepal, small populations are present and slowly recovering in tributaries of the Ganges, such as the Karnali–Babai River system in Bardia National Park and the Narayani–Rapti river system in Chitwan National Park. In spring 2017, the Babai River was surveyed using an unmanned aerial vehicle, which detected 33 gharials on a stretch of 102 km (63 mi).

In India, gharial populations are present in the:

- Ramganga River in Corbett National Park, where five gharials were recorded in 1974. Captive-bred gharials were released since the late 1970s. The population is breeding since 2008, and increased to about 42 adults by 2013. Most of them congregate along an 8 km (5.0 mi) long stretch of the Kalagarh Reservoir's shoreline. Surveys in 2015 revealed a population of 90 gharials, including 59 breeding adults.
- Ganges, where 494 gharials were released between 2009 and 2012 in Hastinapur Wildlife Sanctuary.
- Girwa River in Katarniaghat Wildlife Sanctuary where the small breeding population was reinforced with captive reared gharials since 1979. A total of 909 gharials were released until 2006, but only 16 nesting females were recorded in the same year. In December 2008, 105 individuals were counted, including 35 adults. In spring 2009, 27 nests were detected in seven sites. The number of nest sites decreased from seven in 2017 to two in 2019, possibly due to the upgrowth of woody vegetation and reduced river flow near sandbanks.
- Gandaki River downstream the Triveni barrage west of Valmiki Tiger Reserve and adjacent to Sohagi Barwa Sanctuary. The population increased from 15 gharials in 2010 to 54 individuals recorded in March 2015 on a stretch of 320 km (200 mi). 35 of these gharials were wild-born. The population in the 320 km (200 mi) long river section from the Triveni barrage to the confluence with the Ganges was estimated at 196 adults, 161 juveniles, 140 sub-adults and 37 yearlings between post-monsoon season of 2019 and pre-monsoon 2021.
- Chambal River in National Chambal Sanctuary where 107 gharials were recorded in 1974. Captive-bred gharials were released since 1979, and the population increased to 1,095 gharials in 1992. Between December 2007 and March 2008, 111 gharials were found dead. A total of 948 gharials were counted during surveys in 2013 along the protected river stretch of 414 km (257 mi). In 2017, this population was estimated at 617–761 mature individuals and more than 1250 individuals by two different survey teams; 411 nests were found. By 2019, the population had increased to 1857 individuals including 1116 adults; and 486 nests were recorded.
- Parbati River, a tributary of the Chambal River, where gharials started using a few sand banks since about 2015; 29 gharials were observed in 2016, and 251 hatchlings were counted at two nesting sites in 2017.
- Yamuna River where eight young gharials were detected in autumn 2012 near the confluence of the Ken and Yamuna Rivers. They were probably offspring of the breeding population in the Chambal River and had drifted downriver during monsoon floods.
- Son River where 164 captive-reared gharials were released between 1981 and 2011.
- Koshi River in Bihar, where two gharials were sighted basking in late January 2019 during a survey targeting South Asian river dolphins (Platanista gangetica) on a stretch of about 175 km (109 mi). This is the first record of wild gharials in the river since the 1970s.
- Mahanadi River in Odisha's Satkosia Gorge Sanctuary where about 700 gharials were released between 1977 and the early 1990s. During a 1.5 year long survey in 2005–2006, only one male and one female gharial were detected moving together and sharing sand banks in the river.

Between 1979 and 1993, fewer than 20 individuals were sighted in the upper reaches of the Brahmaputra River between Kaziranga National Park and Dibru-Saikhowa National Park. This population had declined due to commercial fishing, poaching, encroachment by local people in gharial breeding grounds and siltation of river beds following deforestation. In 1998, it was not considered to be viable. About 30 gharials were observed in small lakes and tributaries of the Brahmaputra River in Assam between 2004 and 2007.

In Bangladesh, gharials were recorded in Padma, Jamuna, Mahananda and Brahmaputra rivers between 2000 and 2015.

== Behaviour and ecology ==
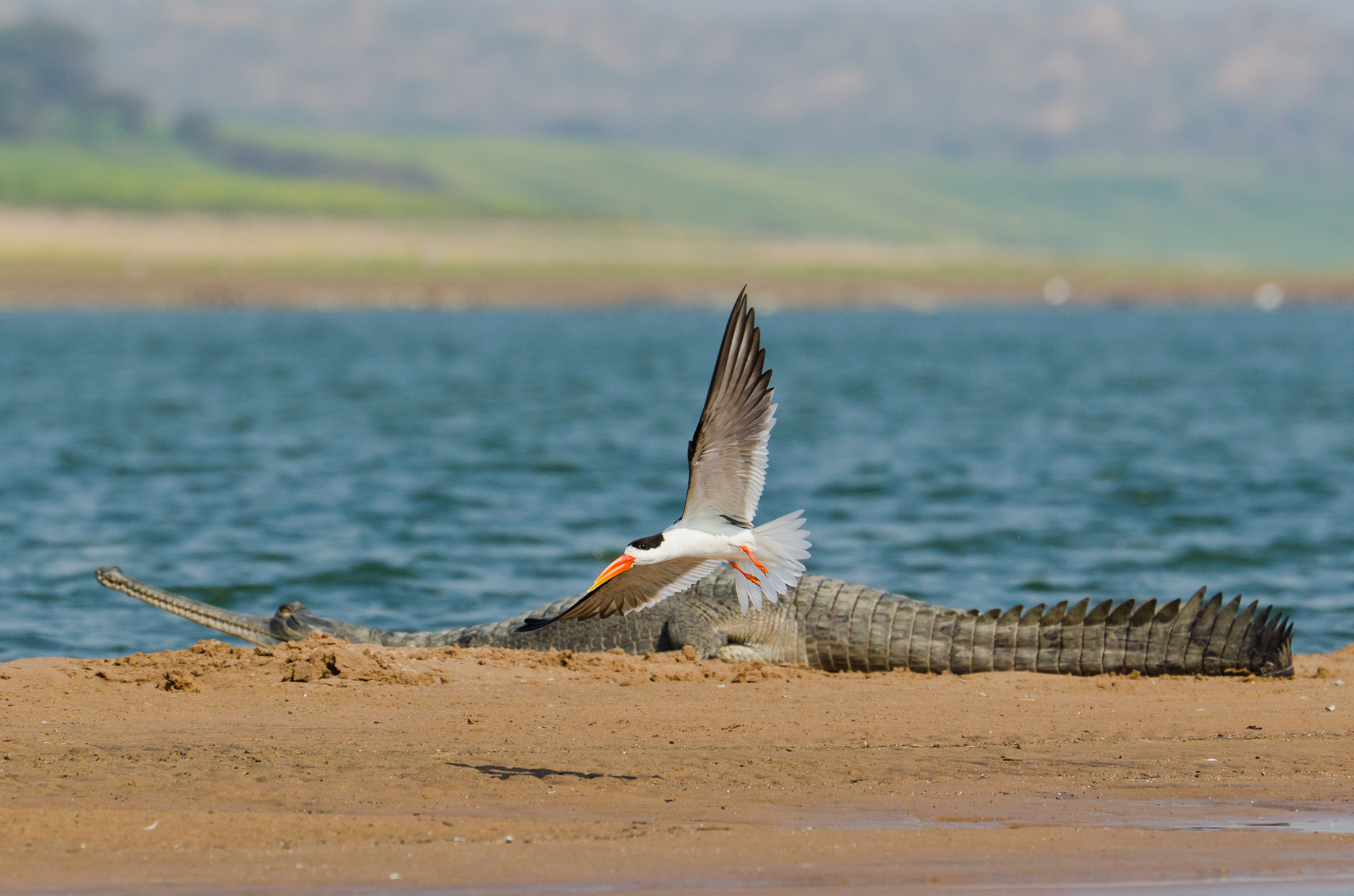

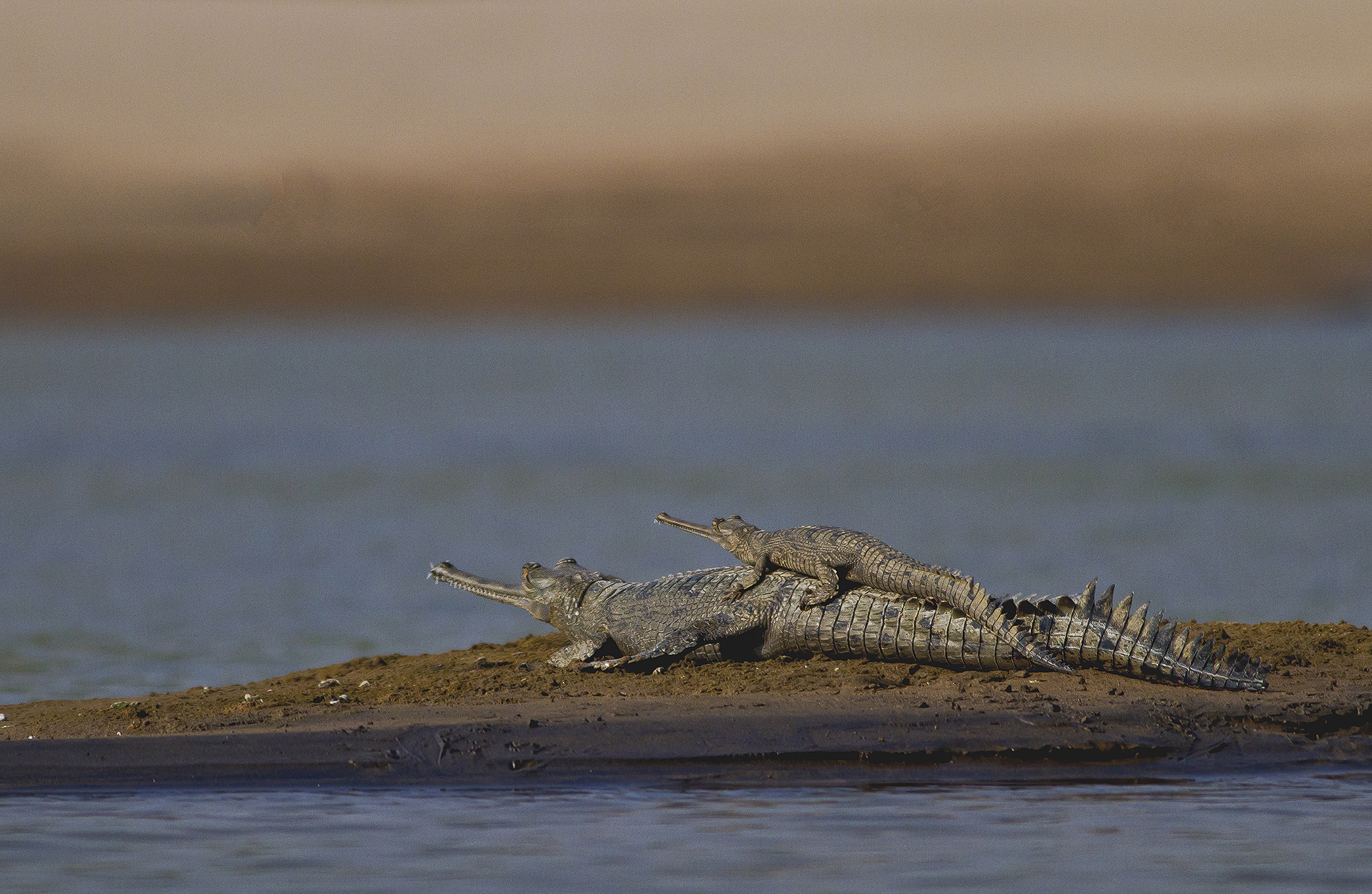
Gharials in National Chambal Sanctuary

The gharial is the most thoroughly aquatic crocodilian. It leaves the water only for basking on riverbanks. Being cold-blooded, it seeks to cool down during hot times and to warm up when ambient temperature is cool. Gharials bask daily in the cold season, foremost in the mornings, and prefer sandy and moist beaches. They change their basking pattern with increasing daily temperatures; they start basking earlier in the mornings, move back into the river when it is hot, and return to the beach later in the afternoon. Groups comprising an adult male, several females and subadults have been observed to bask together. Adult males dominate groups and tolerate immature males. Large groups of young, subadult and adult gharials form in December and January to bask. Adult males and females associate by mid-February.

The gharial shares riverine habitat with the mugger crocodile (Crocodylus palustris) in parts of its range. They use the same nesting grounds, but differ in the selection of basking sites. The gharial basks close to water on shallow, sandy beaches and lays eggs only in sandy soil near water. The mugger crocodile also basks on sandy beaches, but unlike the gharial climbs steep embankments and rocks, and moves farther away from beaches for both basking and nest building. It also preys on fish, but has a broader prey base than the gharial including snakes, turtles, birds, mammals and dead animals.

=== Feeding ecology ===
The gharial is well adapted to hunting fish underwater because of its sharp interlocking teeth and long narrow snout, which meets little resistance in the water. It does not chew its prey, but swallows it whole. Juvenile gharials were observed to jerk their heads back to manoeuvre fish into their gullets, sliding them in head first. Young gharials feed on insects, tadpoles, small fish and frogs. Adults also feed on small crustaceans. Remains of Indian softshell turtle (Nilssonia gangetica) were also found in gharial stomachs. Gharials tear apart large fish and pick up and swallow stones as gastroliths, probably to aid digestion or regulate buoyancy. Some gharial stomachs also contained jewellery. Stones weighing about 4.5 kg (10 lb) were found in a gharial's stomach that was shot in the Sharda River in 1910.

=== Reproduction ===
Females mature at a body length of around 2.6 m (8.5 ft). Captive females breed at a body length of 3 m (9.8 ft). Male gharials mature at 15–18 years of age, when they reach a body length of around 4 m (13 ft) and once the ghara is developed. The ghara is apparently used to indicate sexual maturity, as a sound resonator when bubbling underwater or for other sexual behaviours. During the breeding season from February to March, adult male gharials emit sudden, high amplitude, pulsatile sounds that are audible on land at distances of 200–500 m (660–1,640 ft) and last 11–55 milliseconds.

Courting and mating start by mid-February at the end of the cold season. In the dry season, reproductive females observed in the Chambal River routinely move 80–120 km (50–75 mi) and join female breeding groups to dig nests together. They select sites in riverside sand or silt banks located between 2.5 and 14.5 m (8.2 and 47.6 ft) away from the water and above a water level of 1 to 3.5 m (3.3 to 11.5 ft). These nests are 20–55 cm (0.66–1.80 ft) deep with a diameter of about 50–60 cm (1.6–2.0 ft). Females have been observed digging "trial nests". Between end of March and early April, they lay 20–95 eggs. A record clutch with 97 eggs was found in Katarniaghat Wildlife Sanctuary. The eggs are the largest of all crocodilians and weigh an average of 160 g (5.6 oz). Each egg is 85–90 mm (3.3–3.5 in) long and 65–70 mm (2.6–2.8 in) wide. After 71 to 93 days of incubation, young gharials hatch in July just before the onset of the monsoon. Their sex is most likely determined by temperature, like in most reptiles. Females dig up the hatchlings in response to hatching chirps, but do not assist them to reach the water. They stay at nesting sites until monsoon floods arrive and return after monsoon.

Captive male gharials observed in the 1980s did not participate in guarding nests. A captive male gharial was observed to show an interest in hatchlings and was allowed by the female to carry hatchlings on his back. In the Chambal River, females were observed to stay close to nest sites and guard young gharials until the shoreline was flooded. VHF radio tracking of a junior male gharial revealed that he was the dominant male guarding nests at a communal nesting site for two years. The availability of open riverbanks at potential nesting sites is crucial for reproductive success.

=== Development ===
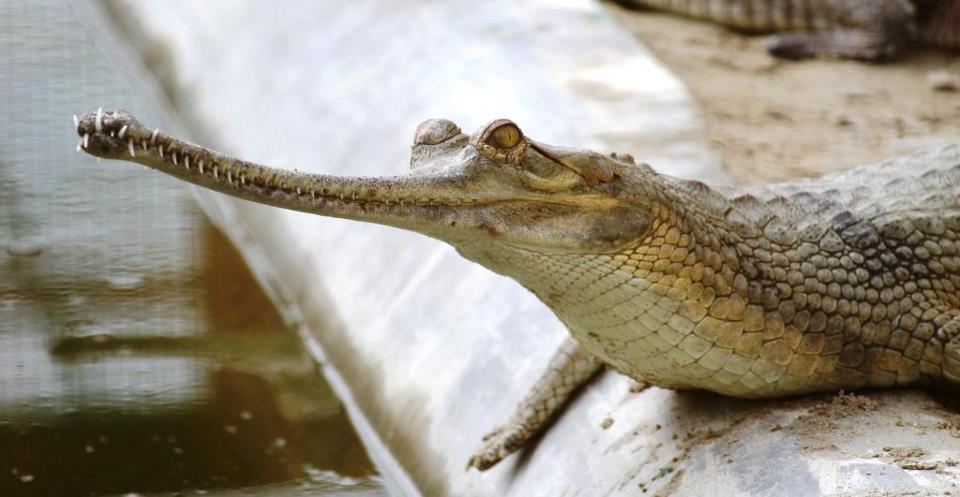
Young gharial in the breeding center at Kukrail Reserve Forest

Hatchlings range from 34–39.2 cm (13.4–15.4 in) in body length with a weight of 82–130 g (2.9–4.6 oz). In two years, they grow to a length of 80–116 cm (31–46 in) and of 130–158 cm (51–62 in) in three years. Gharials hatched and raised in Nepal's Gharial Conservation and Breeding Center measured 140–167 cm (55–66 in) and weighed 5.6–10.5 kg (12–23 lb) at the age of 45 months in April 2013. They consumed up to 3.5 kg (7.7 lb) of fish per individual and month. By the age of 75 months, they had gained 5.9–19.5 kg (13–43 lb) in weight and grown 29–62 cm (11–24 in) reaching body lengths of 169–229 cm (67–90 in).

Young gharials in their first year of age hide and forage in shallow water, preferably in sites that are surrounded by debris of fallen trees. A study along a 425 km (264 mi) stretch of the Chambal River revealed that juvenile gharials up to a body length of 120 cm (3.9 ft) prefer basking sites where the mid river water is 1–3 m (3.3–9.8 ft) deep. As their body size increases, they move to sites with deeper water. Subadult and adult gharials above a body length of 180 cm (5.9 ft) prefer sites where the water is deeper than 4 m (13 ft).

Young gharials move forward by pushing the diagonally opposite legs synchronously. At a young age, they can also gallop but do so only in emergency situations. When they reach a length of about 75 cm (30 in) and a weight of about 1.5 kg (3.3 lb) at the age of 8–9 months, they change to an adult pattern of locomotion of pushing forward with hind and front legs simultaneously. Adults do not have the ability to walk on land in the semi-upright stance as other crocodilians. When basking on the beach, they often turn round so as to face the water.

== Threats ==
The gharial population is estimated to have declined from 5,000–10,000 individuals in 1946 to fewer than 250 individuals in 2006, a decline of 96–98% within three generations. Gharials were killed by fishermen, hunted for skins, trophies and indigenous medicine, and their eggs collected for consumption. The remaining individuals form several fragmented subpopulations. Hunting is no longer considered a significant threat. However, the wild population declined from an estimated 436 adult gharials in 1997 to fewer than 250 mature individuals in 2006. One reason for this decline is the increased use of gill nets for fishing in gharial habitat. The other major reason is the loss of riverine habitat as dams, barrages, irrigation canals and artificial embankments were built; siltation and sand-mining changed river courses; and land near rivers is used for agriculture and grazing by livestock.

When 111 dead gharials were found in the Chambal River between December 2007 and March 2008, it was initially suspected that they had died either because of toxicants or the illegal use of fish nets, in which they became entrapped in and subsequently drowned. Later post mortem pathological testing of tissue samples revealed high levels of heavy metals such as lead and cadmium, which together with stomach ulcers and protozoan parasites reported in most necropsies were thought to have caused their deaths. Water pumps used for pumping water out of the Chambal River have proven to negatively impact the gharial population.

Threats in unprotected stretches of the Karnali River include quarrying for boulders, sand mining and unlicensed fishing.

== Conservation ==
The gharial is listed on CITES Appendix I. In India, it is protected under the Wildlife Protection Act of 1972. In Nepal, it is fully protected under the National Parks and Wildlife Conservation Act of 1973.

=== Reintroduction programmes ===
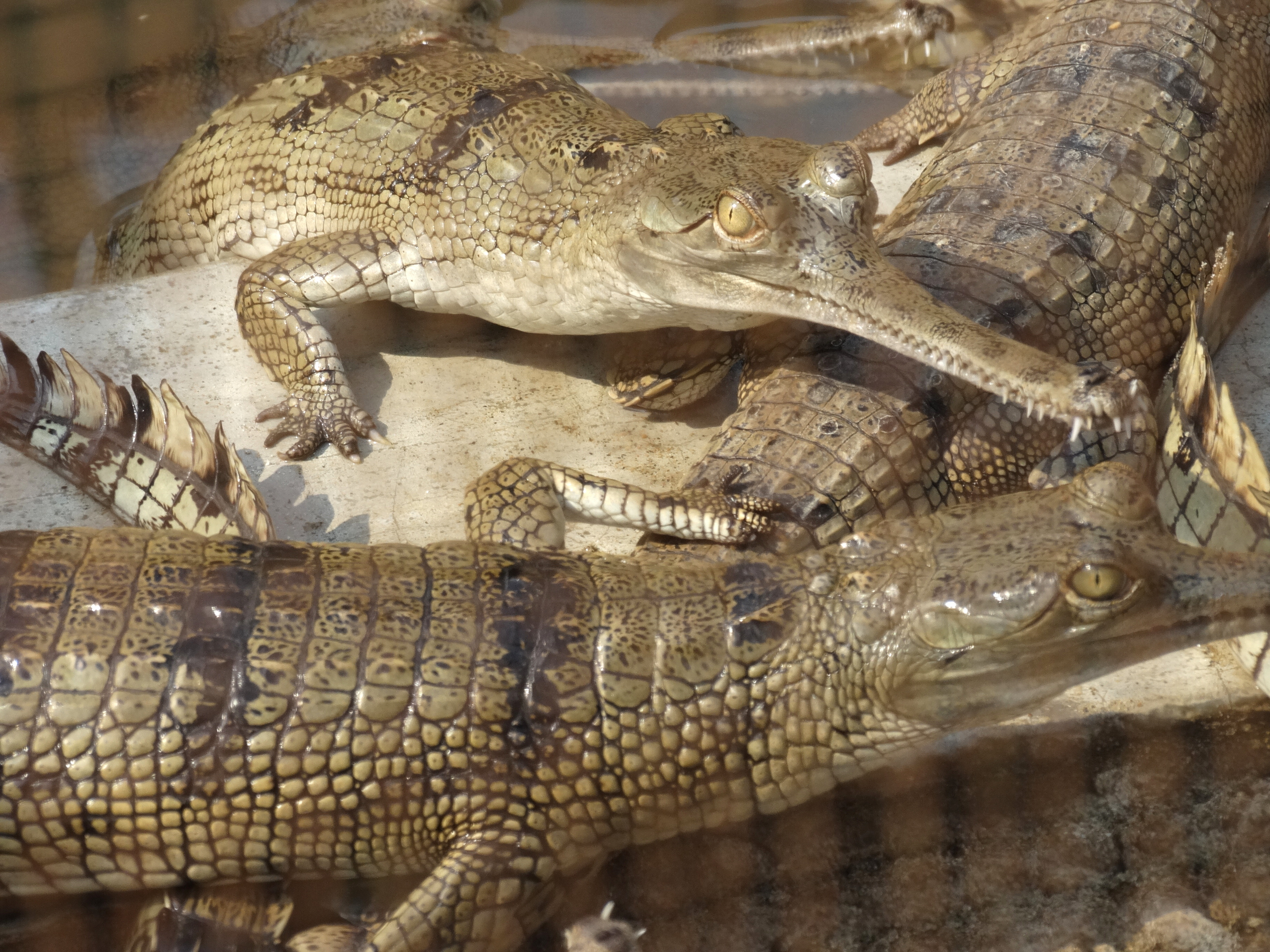
Gharials in the Gharial Conservation and Breeding Center at Chitwan National Park

Since the late 1970s, the gharial conservation approach has been focused on reintroduction. Rivers in protected areas in India and Nepal used to be restocked with captive-bred juvenile gharials. Gharial eggs were incubated, hatched and juvenile gharials raised for two to three years and released when about one metre in length.

In 1975, the Indian Crocodile Conservation Project was set up under the auspices of the Government of India, initially in Odisha's Satkosia Gorge Sanctuary. It was implemented with financial aid of the United Nations Development Fund and the Food and Agriculture Organization. The country's first gharial breeding center was built in Nandankanan Zoological Park. A male gharial was flown in from Frankfurt Zoological Garden to become one of the founding animals of the breeding program. In subsequent years, several protected areas were established. In 1976, two breeding centres were established in Uttar Pradesh, one in Kukrail Reserve Forest and one in Katarniaghat Wildlife Sanctuary, with facilities to hatch and raise up to 800 gharials each year for release in rivers. Between 1975 and 1982, sixteen crocodile rehabilitation centers and five crocodile sanctuaries were established in the country. Gharial eggs were initially purchased from Nepal. In 1991, the Ministry of Environment and Forests withdrew funds for the captive-breeding and egg-collection programs, arguing that the project had served its purpose. In 1997–1998, over 1,200 gharials and over 75 nests were located in the National Chambal Sanctuary, but no surveys were carried out between 1999 and 2003. Gharial eggs collected from wild and captive-breeding nests amounted to 12,000 until 2004. Eggs were incubated, and hatchlings were reared to a length of about one meter or more. More than 5,000 gharials were released into Indian rivers between the early 1980s and 2006. Despite the release of 142 gharials between 1982 and 2007 into the Ken River, only one adult female gharial was observed in the river in spring 2013, indicating that most of the released gharials had not reproduced. Juvenile gharials have also been released into the Beas River in Punjab, India.

In Nepal, wild eggs collected along rivers have been incubated in the Gharial Conservation and Breeding Center in Chitwan National Park since 1978. The first batch of 50 gharials was released in spring 1981 into the Narayani River. In subsequent years, gharials were also released into five other rivers in the country. In 2016, this center was overcrowded with more than 600 gharials aged between 5 and 12 years, and many were too old to be released. Between 1981 and 2018, a total of 1,365 gharials were released in the Rapti–Narayani river system. Reintroducing gharials helped to maintain this population, but the survival rate of released gharials was rather low. Of 36 marked gharials released in the spring seasons of 2002 and 2003 into the Rapti–Narayani rivers, only 14 were found alive in spring 2004. This reintroduction programme has been criticised in 2017 as not being comprehensive and coordinated, as often too old and unsexed gharials were released at disturbed localities during unfavourable cold months and without assessing the efficiency of these releases. It has been suggested to instead leave wild nests in place, increase protection of nesting and basking sites and monitor the movement of gharials.

Releasing captive-reared gharials did not contribute significantly to re-establishing viable populations. Monitoring of released gharials revealed that the reintroduction programmes did not address multiple factors affecting their survival. These factors include disturbances from diversions of river courses, sand mining, cultivation of riversides, fishing by local people and mortality related to fishing methods like the use of gill nets and dynamite. In 2017, members of the Crocodile Specialist Group therefore recommended to foster engagement of local communities in gharial conservation programs.

In May 2023, sightings of the gharial were reported in the Punjab region of Pakistan. This marked the first confirmed sighting of the species in Pakistan after a presumed absence of three decades. In response to these sightings, WWF-Pakistan, in collaboration with the other partners, aims to step up conservation efforts for the gharial. The goal is to ensure that the newly discovered population not only survives but thrives. Pakistan has requested the transfer of hundreds of gharial crocodiles from Nepal in an effort to reintroduce the species.

=== In situ projects ===
The riverbanks of Girwa river were cleared from woody vegetation on sand banks and mid-river islands in 2019, and sand was added in 2020 to create an artificial sand bank of about 1,000 m^{2} (11,000 sq ft). This intervention helped to stabilise and optimise the soil temperature at this site. In 2020, the number of gharial nests on this river stretch increased to 36 from 25 in 2018, and the number of unhatched eggs and dead hatchlings decreased significantly.

=== In captivity ===
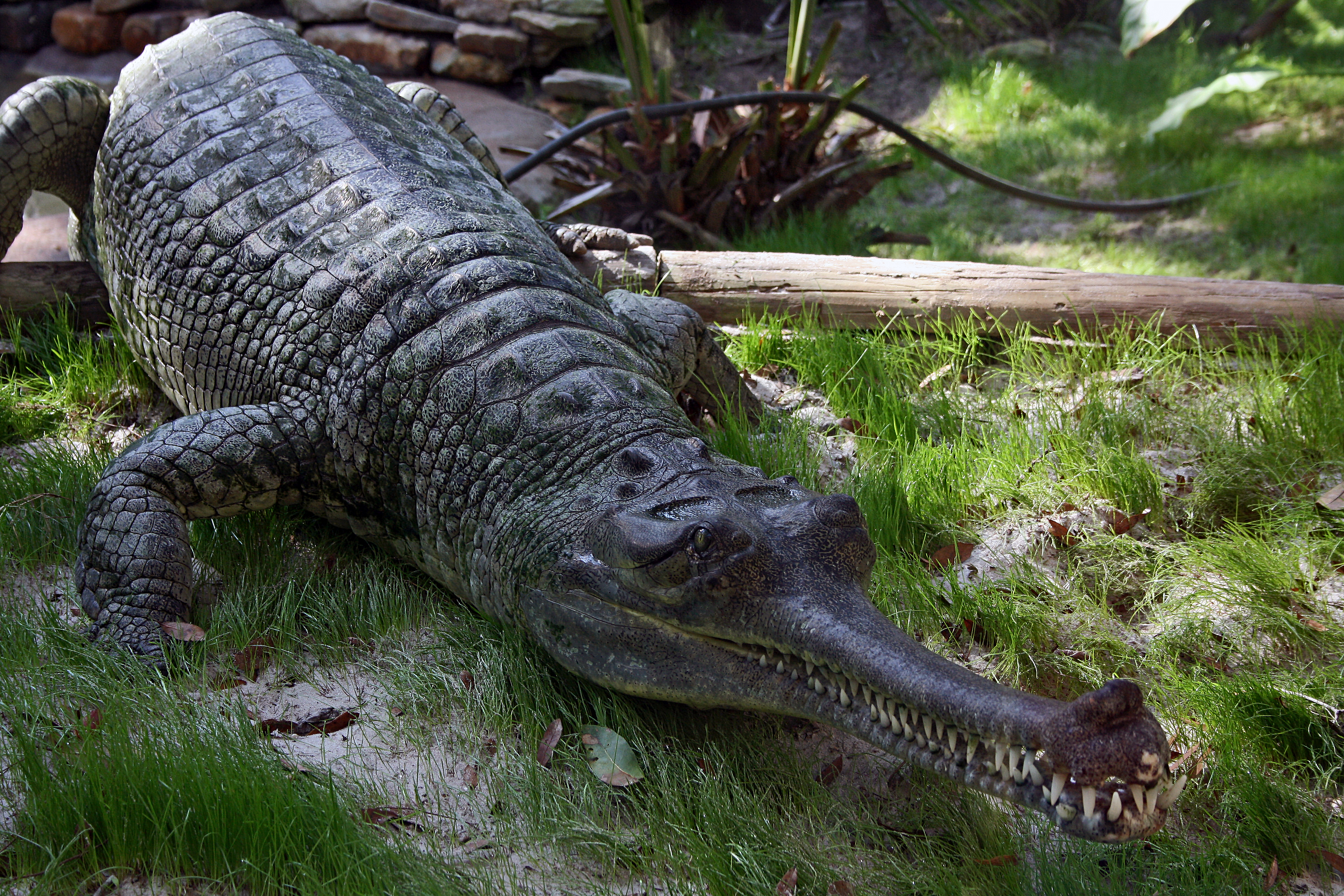
Gharial in a Florida zoo

As of 1999, gharials were also kept in the Madras Crocodile Bank Trust, Mysore Zoo, Jaipur Zoo and Kukrail Gharial Rehabilitation Centre in India.

In Europe, gharials are kept in Prague Zoo and Protivin Crocodile Zoo in the Czech Republic, and the Berlin Zoo in Germany. La Ferme aux Crocodiles, a crocodile farm in France, received six juveniles in 2000 from the Gharial Breeding Centre in Nepal.

In the United States, gharials are kept in Busch Gardens Tampa, Cleveland Metroparks Zoo, Fort Worth Zoo, Honolulu Zoo, San Diego Zoo, National Zoological Park, San Antonio Zoo and Aquarium and St. Augustine Alligator Farm Zoological Park. Bronx Zoo and Los Angeles Zoo received gharials in 2017. In 2023, Fort Worth Zoo announced the birth of four gharials.

== In culture ==
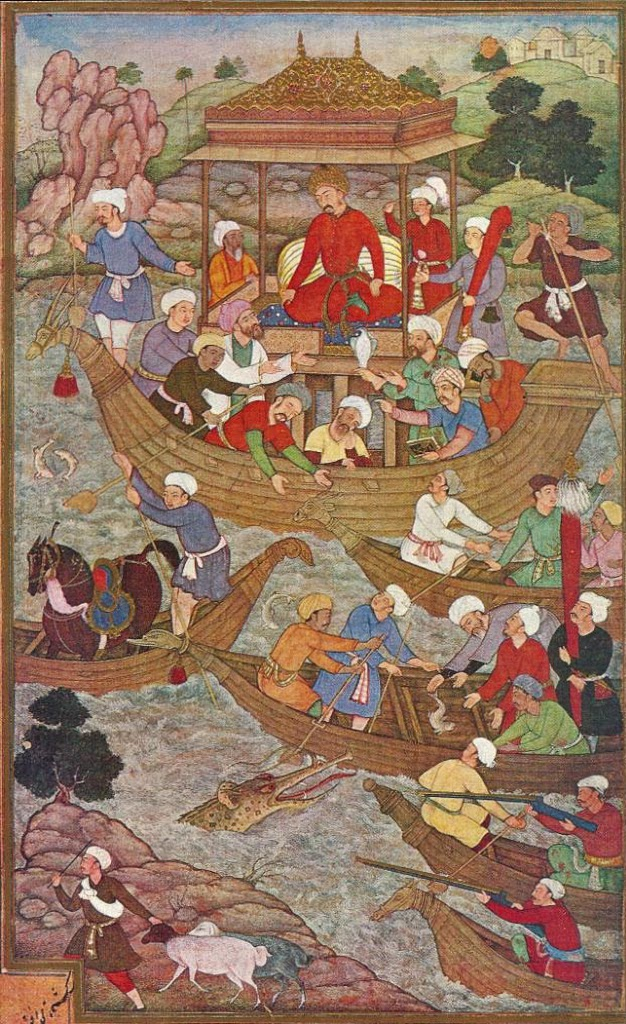
A miniature illustration of the Baburnama showing a gharial, c. 1598, National Museum, New Delhi

The earliest known depictions of the gharial date to the Indus Valley Civilisation. Seals and tablets show gharials with fish in their mouths and surrounded by fish. A tablet shows a deity flanked by a gharial and a fish. These pieces are about 4,000 years old and were found at Mohenjo-daro and Amri, Sindh.

A gharial is depicted on one of the rock carvings on a pillar of the Sanchi Stupa, which dates to the 3rd century BC. In Hindu mythology, the gharial is the vehicle of the river deity Gaṅgā and of the wind and sea deity Varuna.

In the 16th-century book Baburnama, Zahir-ud-din Muhammad Babur accounted of a gharial sighting in the Ghaghara River between Ghazipur and Benares in 1526.

In 1915, a British officer observed the traditional method of Kehal fishermen hunting gharials along the Indus. They staked nets about 60–75 cm (2 ft 0 in – 2 ft 6 in) below the waterline close by a sandbank and waited hidden for gharials to come out of the river for basking. After some time, they left their hiding places, prompting the gharials to dart off to the river and get entangled in the nets.

Local people in Nepal attributed various mystical powers to the ghara of male gharials and killed them to collect their snouts. Tharu people believed that the ghara would repel insects and pests when burnt in a field, and that gharial eggs would be an effective cough medicine and aphrodisiac. Jewellery found in gharial stomachs may have been the reason for the belief of local people that they would eat humans.

Local names for the gharial include 'Lamthore gohi' and 'Chimpta gohi' in Nepali, whereby gohi means crocodile; 'Gharial' in Hindi; 'Susar' in Marathi; 'Nakar' and 'Bahsoolia nakar' in Bihari; 'Thantia kumhira' in Odia, with 'thantia' being derived from the Sanskrit word 'tuṇḍa' meaning beak, snout, elephant's trunk; the male is called 'Ghadiala' and the female 'Thantiana' in Odia.

== See also ==
- Gharial conservation in Pakistan
- Crocodiles in India
- List of reptiles of South Asia
