= Crocodilia in India =

Three species of crocodilian are present in India. The mugger (or marsh) crocodile (Crocodylus palustris) is found in lakes and rivers throughout the country. The saltwater crocodile (C. porosus) is found along the eastern coast of the country and the Nicobar and Andaman Islands. The gharial (Gavialis gangeticus) is found in river areas, though is greatly reduced from its previous range. In the pre-historic period, seven species resided in India.

== Family Crocodylidae ==
=== Mugger crocodile ===
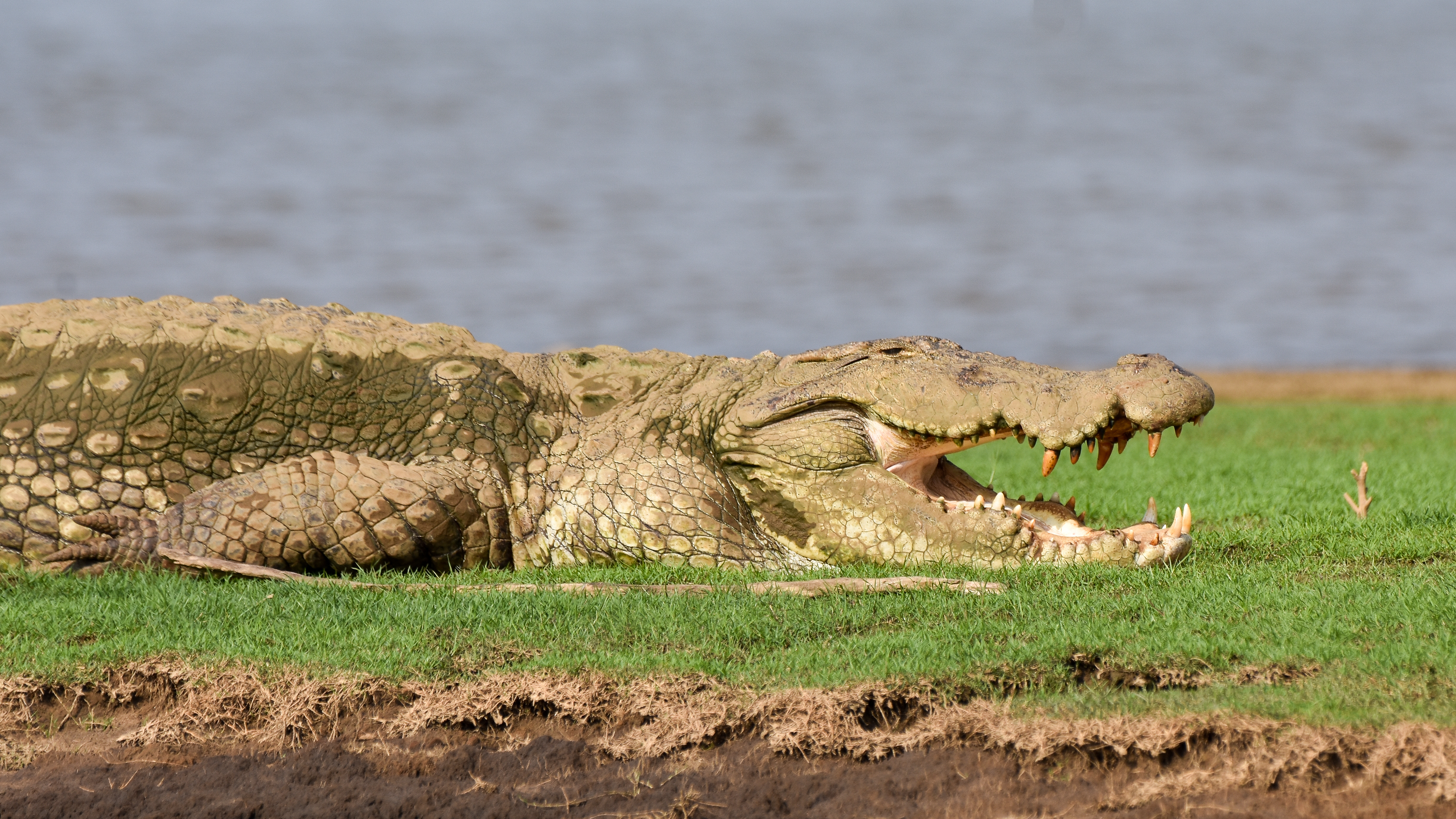
Mugger Crocodile Basking in Kabini, India

The mugger crocodile is India's most common species. They are not as long as saltwater crocodiles. Their average size is about 2.5–3 metres (8.2–9.8 ft) for Females and 3–4 metres (9.8–13.1 ft) for males. An Indian biologist (of American origin) named Romulus Whitaker established the Madras Crocodile Bank for conservation and breeding of crocodiles. Today, there are thousands of crocodiles in the Madras bank. Although, in the rest of India, one can still see crocodiles in the wild - in rivers and national parks.

=== Saltwater crocodile ===
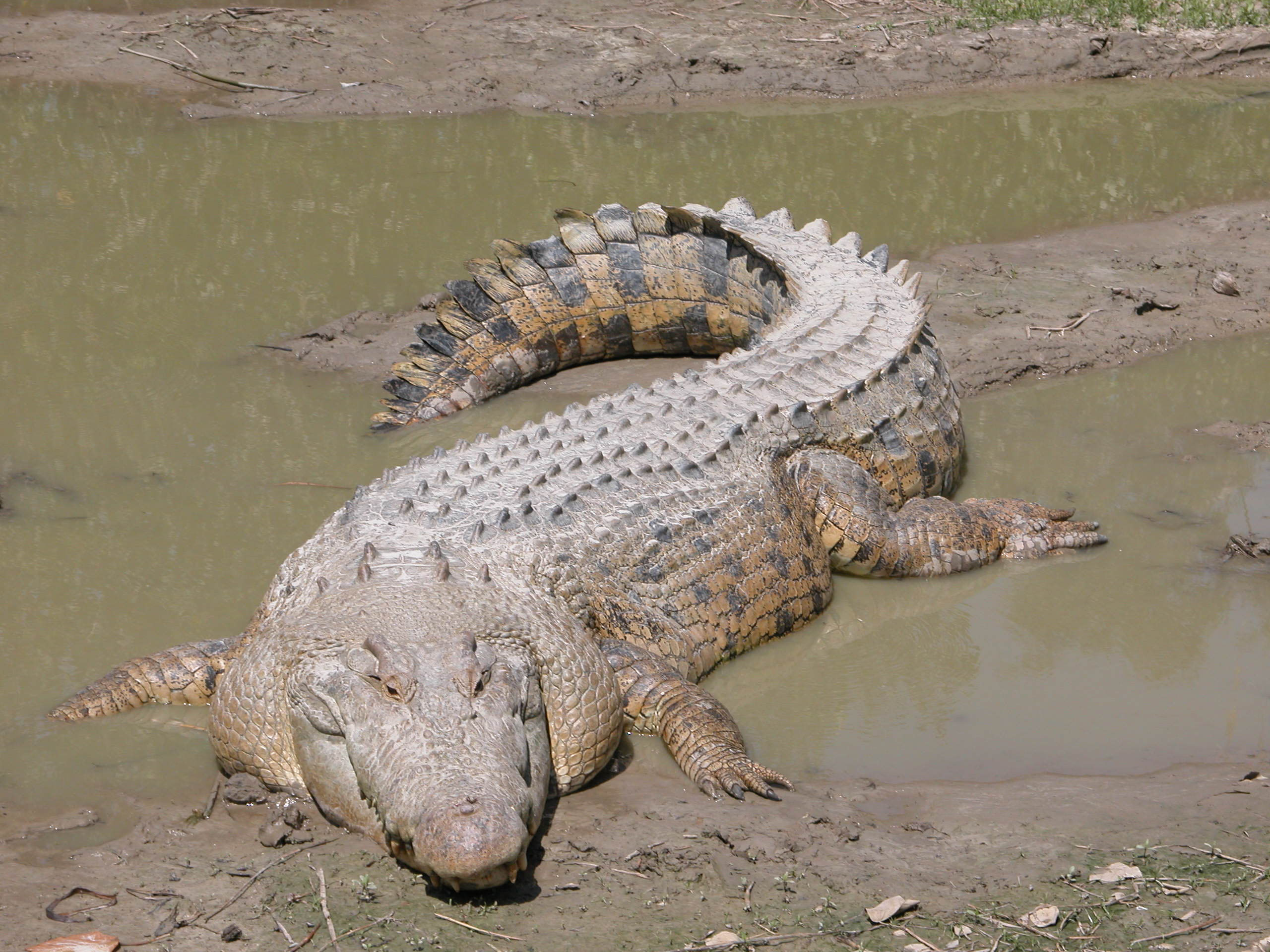
Saltwater crocodile

The saltwater crocodile is found in the eastern states of Odisha, West Bengal, Andhra Pradesh and Tamil Nadu as well as the Nicobar and Andaman Islands. The largest specimen was found in Odisha, and reached 7.0 m (23.0 ft)(source?). Its population numbers about 300. Saltwater crocodiles live in the mangroves of Bhittarkanika and Sunderbans, Mahanadi Delta, and in the swamplands in Odisha and West Bengal (including rivers).

== Family Gavialidae ==
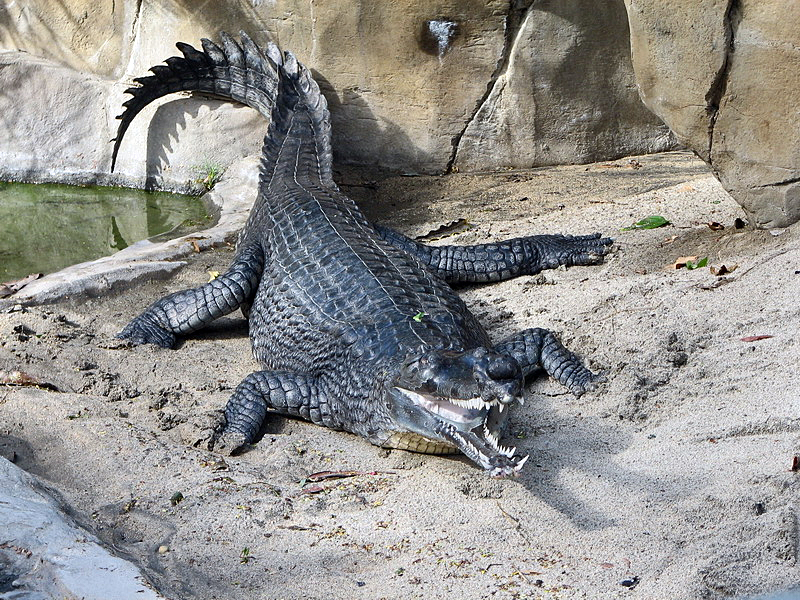
A captive gharial at the San Diego Zoo

The largest gharial in the wilderness was a specimen which measured 19.5 ft (5.9 m), and was found in the River Girwa, at Katarniaghat Wildlife Sanctuary. It is the rarest crocodilian species. Only four were left in 1975 when Whitaker started a breeding programme for gharials. Their population had increased to about 1000. Earlier, they were found in rivers from Japan to Spain. They are now limited to India, Bangladesh and Nepal. They are found only in some rivers of India which include the Chambal, Girwa, Ganges, Yamuna, Kali, Kosi and Gandak.

The Wildlife Institute of India (WII) conducted a survey of gharial populations in the Ganga-basin, over an area of 7,000 square kilometers. The basin-wide survey, published in early 2026, recorded over 3,000 gharials.

== Human intervention ==
Crocodile farms are used mainly for conservation and breeding programs. In January 2019, a controversial programme to relocate 300 crocodiles from the area of the Statue of Unity in Gujarat started.

== See also ==
- Madras Crocodile Bank Trust
- List of reptiles of South Asia
