= East Deccan dry evergreen forests =

Ecoregion of India

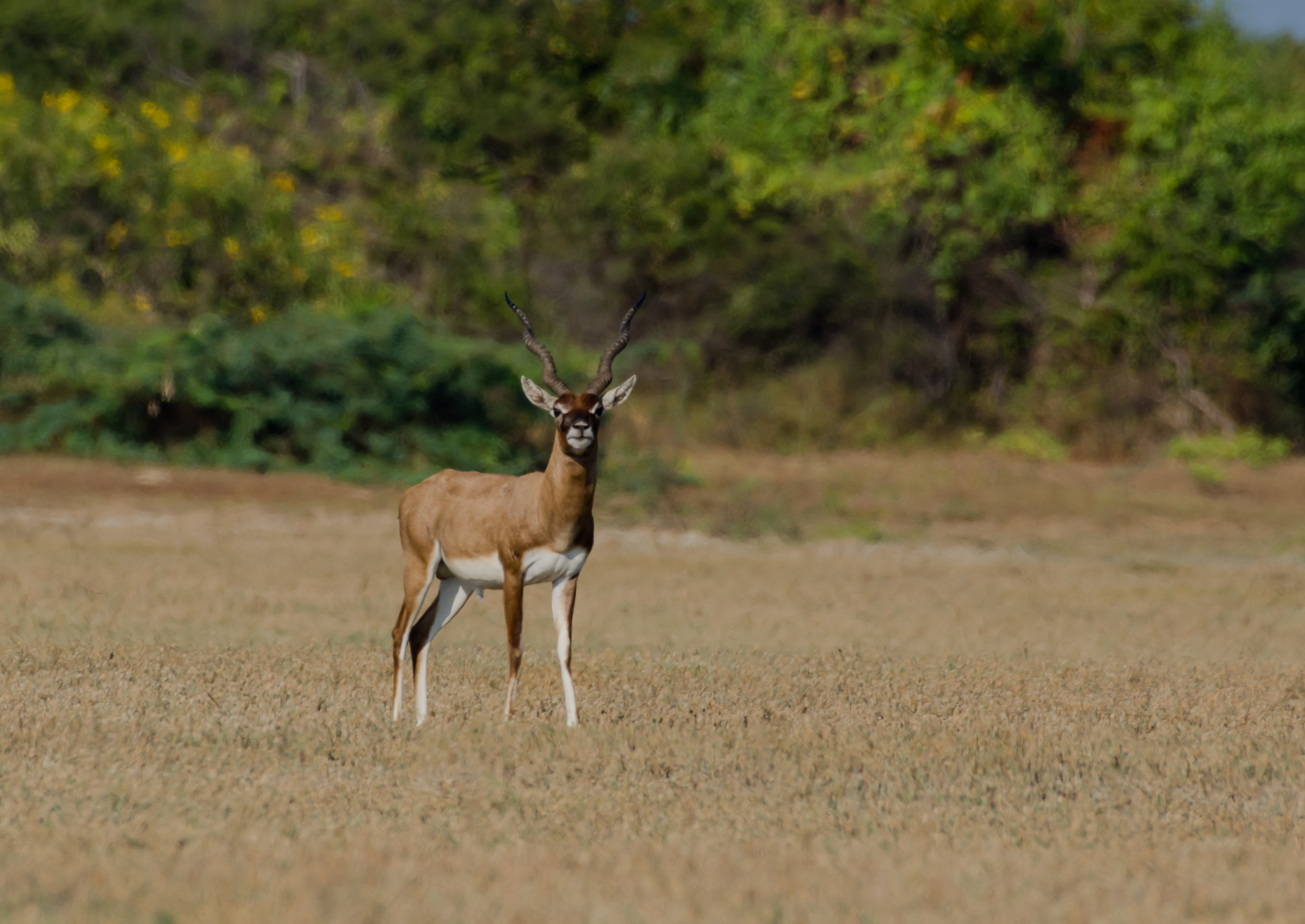
- Blackbuck at Point Calimere Wildlife and Bird Sanctuary

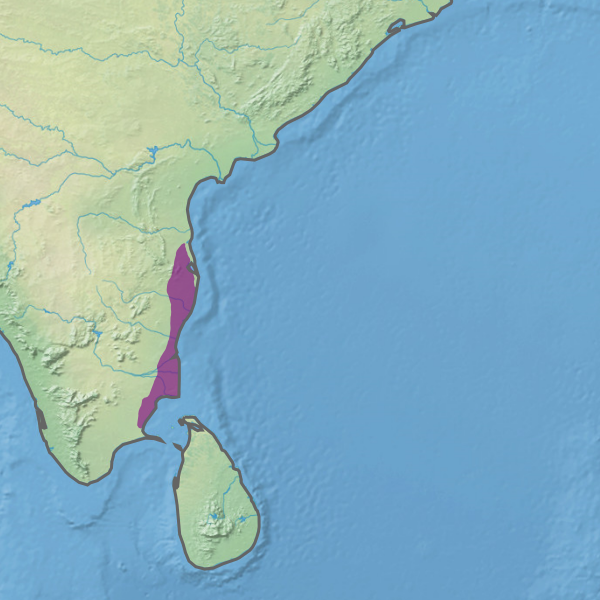
- Ecoregion territory (in purple)

Ecology
- Realm: Indomalayan
- Biome: tropical and subtropical dry broadleaf forests
- Borders: Deccan thorn scrub forests; Godavari-Krishna mangroves

Geography
- Area: 25,084 km^{2} (9,685 mi^{2})
- Country: India
- States: Andhra Pradesh; Tamil Nadu, Puducherry (union territory)

Conservation
- Conservation status: critical/endangered
- Protected: 572 km^{2} (2%)

The East Deccan dry evergreen forests is an ecoregion of southeastern India. The ecoregion includes the coastal region behind the Coromandel Coast on the Bay of Bengal, between the Eastern Ghats and the sea. It covers eastern Tamil Nadu, part of Puducherry and south eastern Andhra Pradesh.

== Setting ==
The East Deccan dry evergreen forests lie in the rain shadow of the Western Ghats and Eastern Ghats, which block the rain-bearing summer southwest monsoon.

The ecoregion covers an area of 25,500 square kilometers (9,800 sq mi), extending from Ramanathapuram District of Tamil Nadu to Nellore District of Andhra Pradesh. Most of the terrain is flat and under 100 m elevation, except for small hillocks and low hills. Parts of the ecoregion occur between the Godavari-Krishna mangroves ecoregion along the coast to the east and the Deccan thorn scrub forests to the west.

Much of the ecoregion is densely settled, and has been substantially altered by human activity, including agriculture, grazing, and forestry, over the centuries. The ecoregion is home to the metropolis of Chennai (Madras), and a number of other cities, including Pondicherry, Thanjavur, Kanchipuram and Nellore. It is estimated that 95% of the original forest cover has been cleared, and the species composition of the remaining forests have been altered by intensive human use including the removal of all the taller trees.

Unlike most of the world's tropical and subtropical dry broadleaf forests, whose trees tend to lose their leaves during the dry season to conserve moisture, the East Deccan dry evergreen forests retain their leaves year round. Only two other ecoregions exhibit a similar pattern, the Sri Lanka dry-zone dry evergreen forests and the Southeastern Indochina dry evergreen forests.

The ecoregion is home to two important wetlands, Kaliveli Lake in Viluppuram District of Tamil Nadu, and Pulicat Lake north of Chennai. Kaliveli Lake is one of the largest wetlands in peninsular India, and is deemed a wetland of national and international importance by the IUCN. It is a seasonal wetland, with a gradient from freshwater to brackish water, and is an important feeding and breeding ground on migratory bird flyway. It is currently threatened by encroachment by agricultural fields, wildlife poaching, loss of the surrounding forests, and increases in commercial prawn farming.

== Climate ==
Annual rainfall in this ecoregion ranges between 1000 mm and 1800 mm, while the mean annual temperature is around 27.5°C (ranging from an absolute minimum of about 17°C in January to a maximum of around 40°C in May-June). Rain mostly falls during the highly variable northeast monsoon between October and December.

== Flora ==
The original vegetation of the ecoregion consisted of forests with an understory of evergreen trees and an emergent canopy of taller deciduous trees, including Albizia amara, and Chloroxylon swietenia. Intensive human use of the forests over the centuries has mostly eliminated the deciduous canopy species, and the ecoregion's remaining forests are now characterized by areas of leathery-leaved evergreen forest, with a relatively low (10-meter) closed canopy. Predominant species are Manilkara hexandra, Mimusops elengi, Ceylon ebony (Diospyros ebenum), strychnine tree (Strychnos nux-vomica), Eugenia spp., Drypetes sepiaria, and Flacourtia indica.

Across 75 sites of tropical dry evergreen forests, one study enumerated 149 woody plant species, including 102 trees, 47 lianas, and 3 herbs, with the number of woody plant species per site ranging from 10 to 69 species.

One study in two remnant sacred groves in this ecoregion recorded 169 angiosperm species, of which the dominant tree species were Albizia amara, A. odoratissima, Borassus flabellifer, Buchanania axillaris, Chloroxylon swietenia, Drypetes sepiaria, Ficus benghalensis, Lannea coromandelica, Lepisanthes tetraphylla, Memecylon umbellatum, Pterospermum suberifolium, and Syzygium cumini. Puthupet forest (12°05’702”N – 79° 87’ 148” E) is predominantly Memecylon umbellatum, with Pterospermum canescens, Diospyros ebenum, Drypetes sepiaria, Aglaia elaeagnoidea, Pongamia pinnata, Azadirachta indica, Walsura trifoliolata, Calophyllum inophyllum, and Albizia amara.

The density of trees in the forest stands ranges from 953 to 1357 stems (of girth greater than 20 cm at breast height) per hectare. 6-8 percent of the ecoregion remains in forest, which is found in isolated pockets. Most of the ecoregion's forests have been degraded into tropical dry evergreen scrublands, characterized by thorny species such as Ziziphus glaberrima, Dichrostachys cinerea, Catunaregam spinosa, and Carissa spinarum.

The plant community of remnant dry evergreen forest patches in sacred groves includes rare evergreen species such as Polyalthia suberosa, Aglaia elaeagnoidea, and Pamburus missionis, besides medicinal herbs like Hemidesmus indicus, Gloriosa superba, Andrographis paniculata, Dioscorea oppositifolia, and Tinospora cordifolia.

== Fauna ==
Mammals found in this ecoregion include the dhole (Cuon alpinus), sloth bear (Melursus ursinus) and Indian spotted chevrotain (Moschiola indica).

== Protected areas ==
Two percent of the ecoregion lies in reserves and protected areas. Another 6% is forested but unprotected. Many forest areas are very small, and include temple groves and reserved forests.

Protected areas include Guindy National Park in Chennai District, and Nanmangalam, and Vandalur reserve forests in Kanchipuram District. In Villupuram District, the Marakkanam reserve forest includes the three forest areas of Marakkanam, Kurumpuram, and Agaram. The sacred grove of Marakkanam preserves a section of evergreen closed canopy forest. Kurumpuram forest (12º4’N-79º44’E) was designated a reserve forest in 1960, but has suffered degradation from timber poaching, firewood harvesting, and hunting wild animals. Several other temple groves in the area around Puducherry, including Puthupet, Pillaichavadi, Mudaliarchavadi, and Kottakarai, preserve small enclaves of forest.

The Point Calimere Wildlife and Bird Sanctuary protects a 17.26 km^{2} enclave of dry evergreen forest, as well as tidal wetlands and mangroves. Other coastal preserves in the region include Vettangudi Bird Sanctuary (30 km^{2}) in Sivaganga district of Tamil Nadu, Nelapattu Bird Sanctuary (160 km^{2}) on Pulicat Lake in Nellore district of Andhra Pradesh, and Pichavaram reserve in Cuddalore district.

Since the 1973, the Auroville Foundation has undertaken restoration of dry evergreen forest at Pitchandikulam in Auroville, near Pondicherry. The forest covers 28 ha (70 acres), and includes many native plants collected from nearby remnant forests and propagated in their nursery. In 2003 the foundation established a 14 ha (35 acre) forest and resource centre at Nadukuppam, near Marakkanam, with both dry evergreen forest species and various agro-forestry crops.
