= C20H30O5 =

The molecular formula C_{20}H_{30}O_{5} (molar mass: 350.449 g/mol, exact mass: 350.2093 u) may refer to:

- Andrographolide
- Prostaglandin E3 (PGE3)
