= Point Calimere Wildlife and Bird Sanctuary =

Protected area in Tamil Nadu, India

- IUCN category IV (habitat/species management area)
- Location within Tamil Nadu Location within India
- Interactive map of Point Calimere Wildlife and Bird Sanctuary
- Location: Tamil Nadu, India
- Coordinates: 10°19′N 79°52′E
- Area: 21.47 km^{2} (8.29 sq mi)
- Established: 1967
- Governing body: Tamil Nadu Forest Department
- Website: web.archive.org/web/20080121104043/http://www.forests.tn.nic.in/WildBiodiversity/ws_pcws.html

Ramsar Wetland
- Designated: 19 August 2002
- Reference no.: 1210

Point Calimere Wildlife and Bird Sanctuary is a protected area in Tamil Nadu, South India, covering 21.47 km^{2} (8.29 sq mi) along the Palk Strait where it meets the Bay of Bengal at Point Calimere at the southeastern tip of Nagapattinam District. It was created in 1967 for the conservation of the blackbuck and also hosts large congregations of waterbirds, especially greater flamingos. It has been classified as an Important Bird Area.

== Geography ==
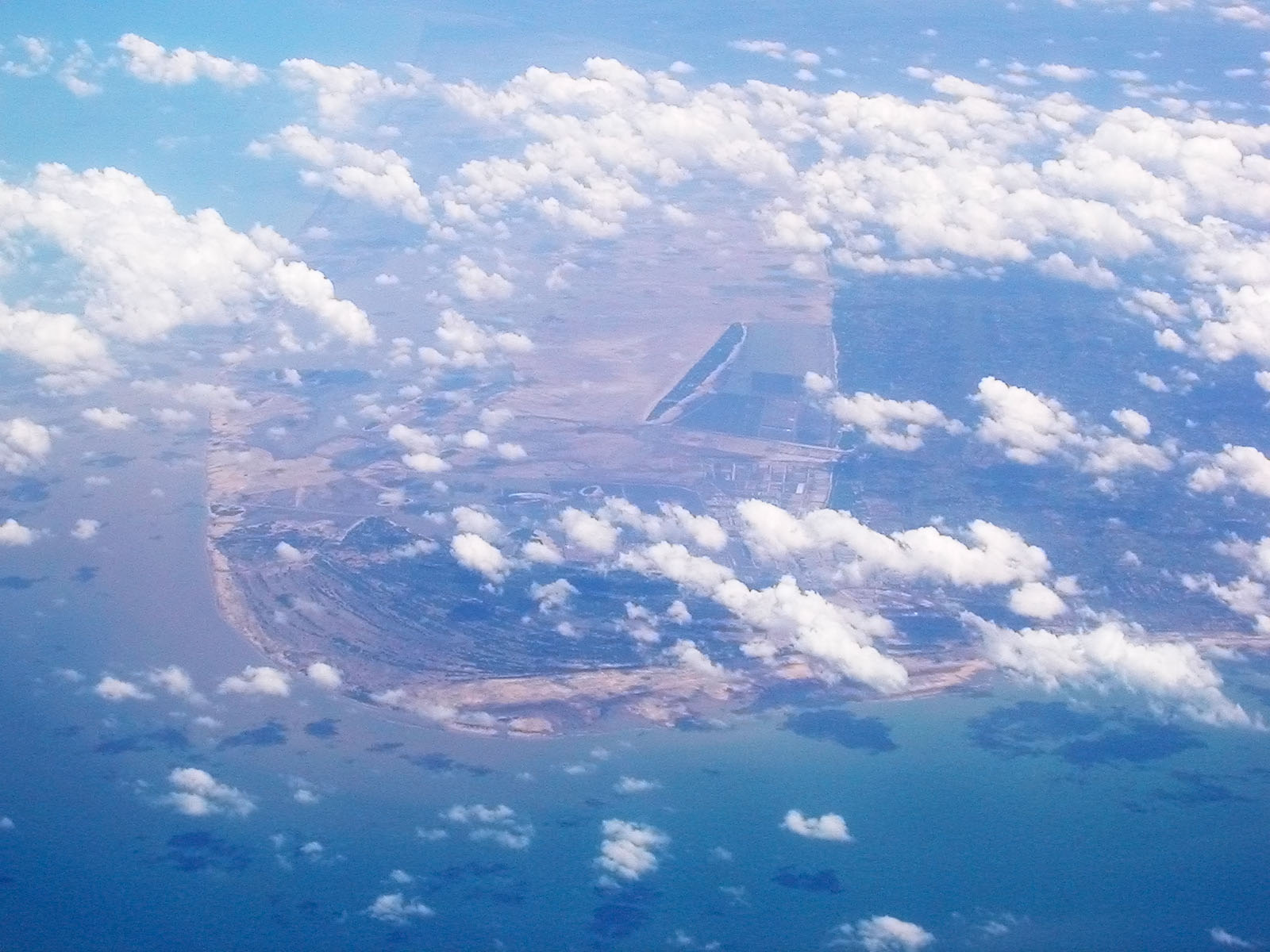
Aerial view of Point Calimere

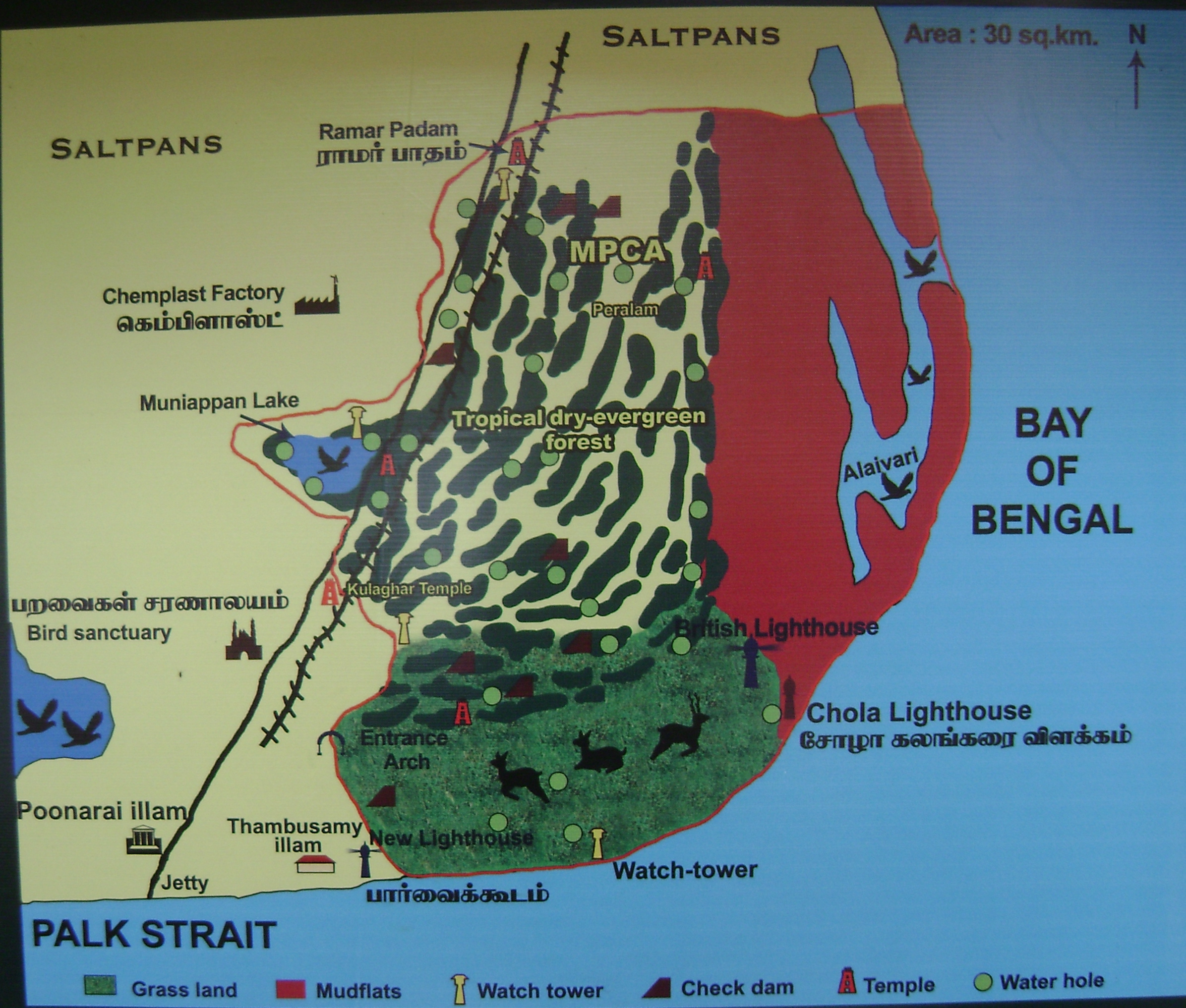
Map of the sanctuary

Point Calimere Wildlife and Bird Sanctuary forms the easternmost and most biologically diverse part of Ramsar Site no. 1210 which on 19 August 2002, was declared a place of international importance for the conservation of waterbirds and their wetlands habitats. This 385 km^{2} (149 sq mi) site comprises PCWBS, Panchanadikulam Wetland, Unsurveyed Salt swamp, Thalainayar Reserved Forest and Muthupet Mangroves. It is all part of the Great Vedaranyam Swamp, except the reserved forest.

The sanctuary is an island surrounded by the Bay of Bengal to the east, the Palk Straight to the south and swampy backwaters and salt pans to the west and north. Low sand dunes are located along the coast and along the western periphery with coastal plains, tidal mud-flats and shallow seasonal ponds in between. Sand dunes in the east are mostly now stabilised by Prosopis juliflora and the higher dunes in the west are stabilised by dense dry evergreen forests. The tallest dune in the sanctuary and the highest point of land in Nagapattinam District is 7 m (23 ft). at the northwest corner of the sanctuary at Ramar Padam.

== History ==
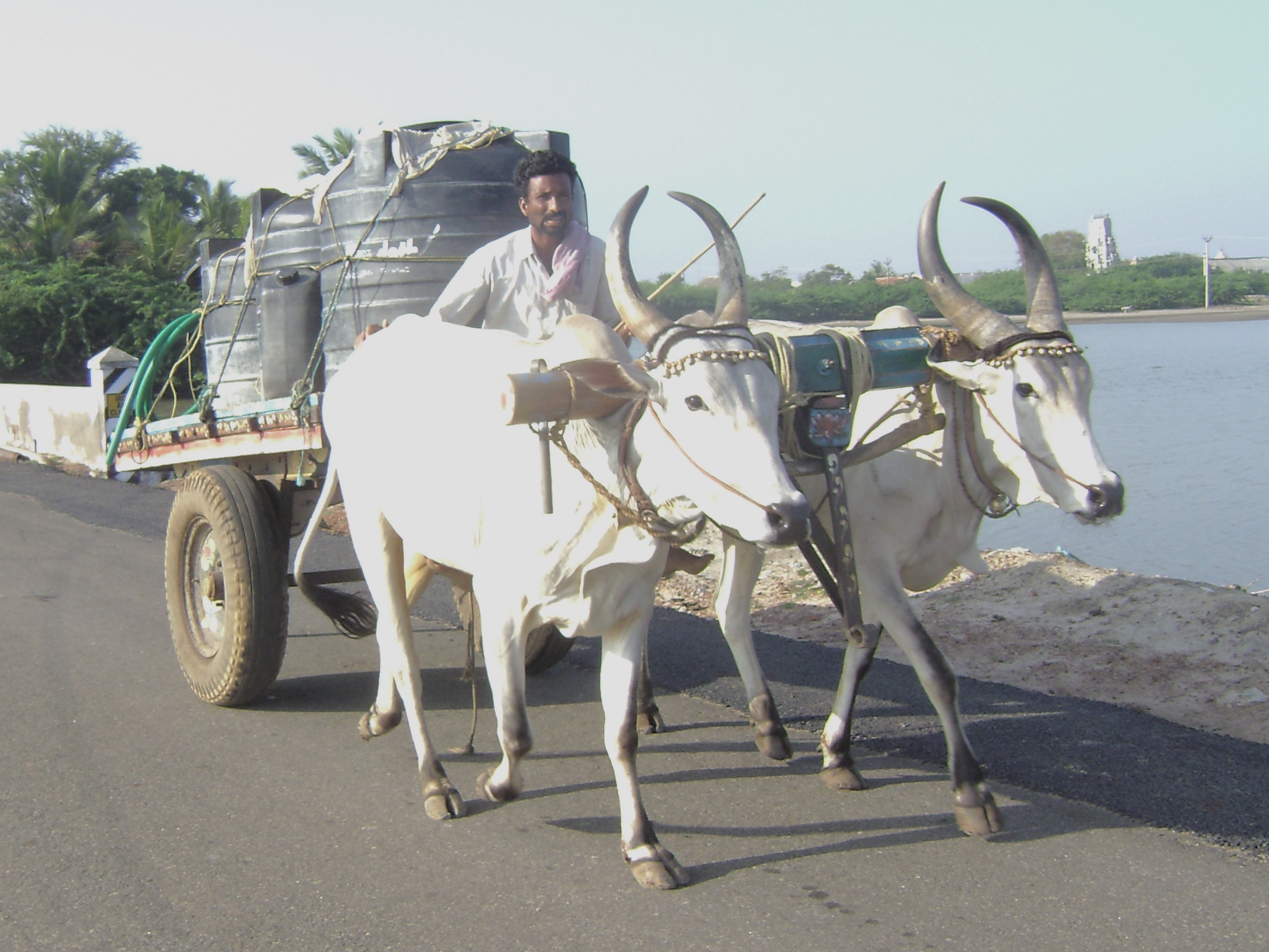
Water transport to PCWBS by bullock cart

In the early years of the Sanctuary management was concentrated on prevention of poaching and provision of water to the wildlife. Poaching has been controlled but water supply is a continuing effort. In 1979 the first of several water troughs supplied from water barrels transported by bullock cart and open wells were built. Beginning in 2001–02 several perennial water holes supplied by pipe from bore wells and a large elevated water tank on the western edge of the sanctuary were built.

Several tree planting schemes to increase biodiversity have yielded poor results, with the exception of Casuarina equisetifolia. Current practice is to avoid new tree planting and concentrate on removal of the invasive Prosopis juliflora. An annual wildlife census has been conducted since 1991.

The Bombay Natural History Society has been conducting regular bird migration studies in the sanctuary since 1959. In 2007 it is building a new field station in Kodaikadu.

On 9 March 1998 a 45 m (148 ft) modern lighthouse near Kodaikorai Beach was commissioned.

In 1999 many speed breakers were installed on the Vedaranyam – Kodaikorai road which have effectively prevented the killing of wildlife by speeding vehicles. In 2004/05 nearly 100 boundary pillars were erected for boundary demarcation.

On 26 December 2004 a tsunami as high as 3 metres (10 ft) hit the Kodiyakarai coast of the sanctuary. Seawater flooded the entire sanctuary with four feet of water. The sanctuary escaped serious damage and the sanctuary, animals and birds largely survived the giant wave, but 5,525 people were killed in neighbouring parts of Nagapattinam District.

The documentary film Point Calimere – Little Kingdom by the Coast by Shekar Dattatri won the Centre for Media Studies (CMS) Vatavaran 2007 award in the Nature category.

== Flora ==
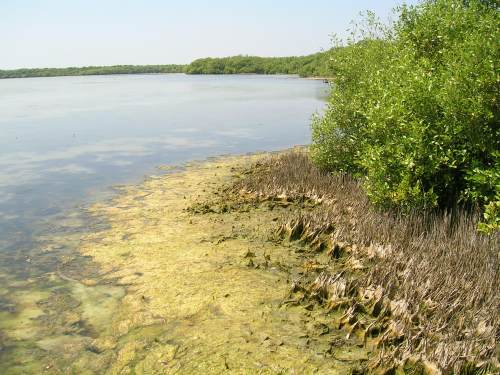
Mangrove forest at Muthupet

This site is a mix of salt swamps, mangroves, backwaters, mudflats, grasslands and East Deccan dry evergreen forests. 364 of flowering plant species have been identified in the sanctuary of which 50% are herbs and the others are climbers, shrubs and trees. About 198 of these have medicinal properties. Manilkara hexandra, locally called Palai is the dominant dry evergreen species and an important food source for fruit eating birds. Middle canopy is dominated by the invasive Prosopis juliflora and the most abundant undergrowth is Memecylon umbellatum.

== Fauna ==
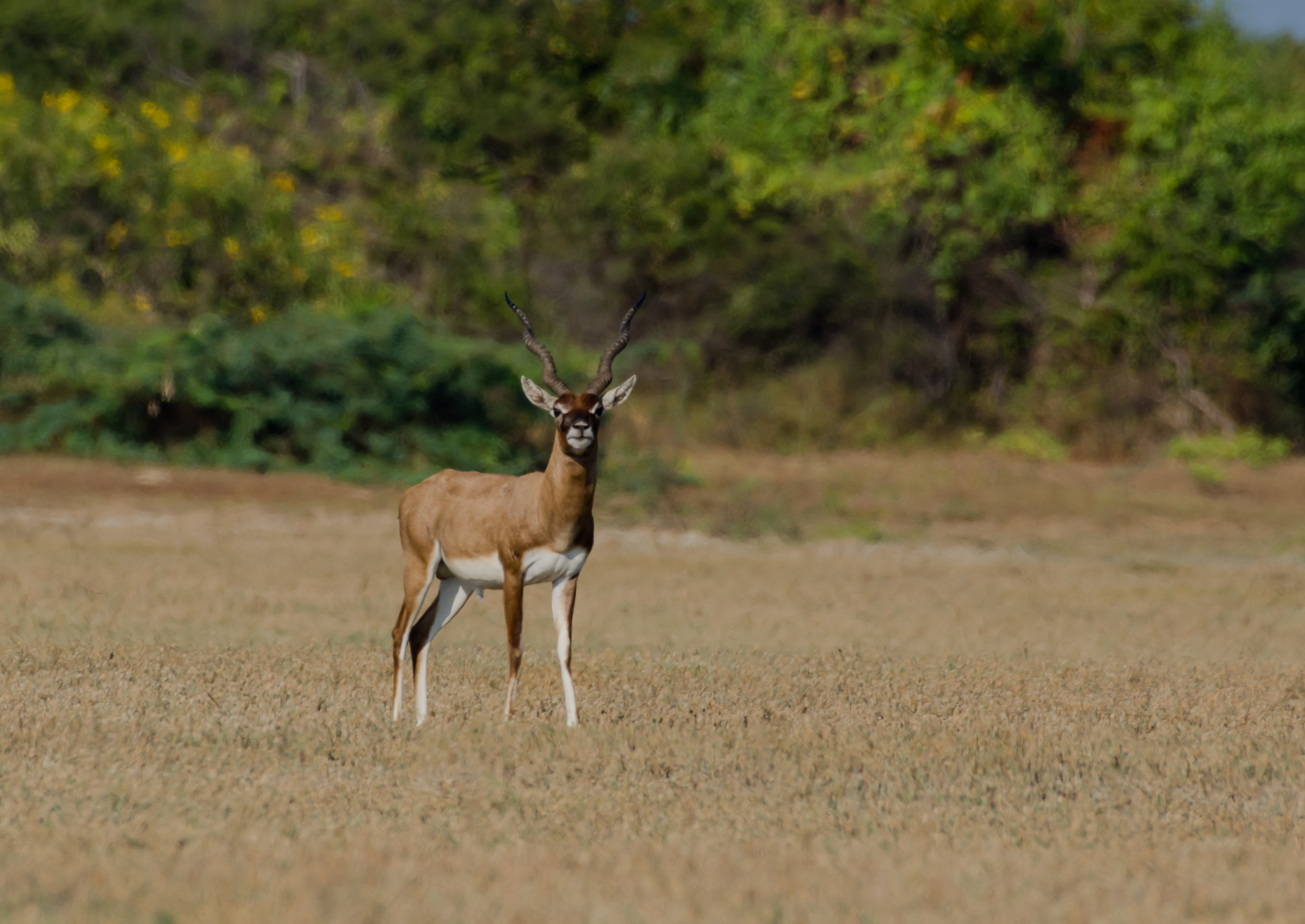
Blackbuck at point calimere sanctuary

This sanctuary is an area of high biodiversity, with 14 mammal species, 18 reptile species and nine amphibian species. The flagship species of the sanctuary is the blackbuck, one of the four antelope species in India and the most numerous large animal in the sanctuary. The population estimate of the blackbuck at Point Calimere more than doubled in thirty years, from 750–800 in 1967 to 1,908 in 1998/99. This isolated population of blackbuck probably survived unmolested throughout the centuries due to the locals' now declining belief that eating its meat causes leprosy. The predators of the blackbuck at Point Calimere are jackals, and sometimes village dogs. Competition for food is from domestic and feral cattle.

Other notable animals include: chital, golden jackal, bonnet monkey, wild boar, monitor lizard, short-nosed fruit bat, small Indian civet, Indian star tortoise, Indian grey mongoose, black-naped hare, jungle cat and feral horse. Marine species include the Bottlenose dolphin and olive ridley turtle. In 2002 a pair of Bryde's whale were found washed ashore near the sanctuary. One 10 ton 35-foot whale was successfully towed back to sea. This was the first successful rescue of a beached whale in Asia.

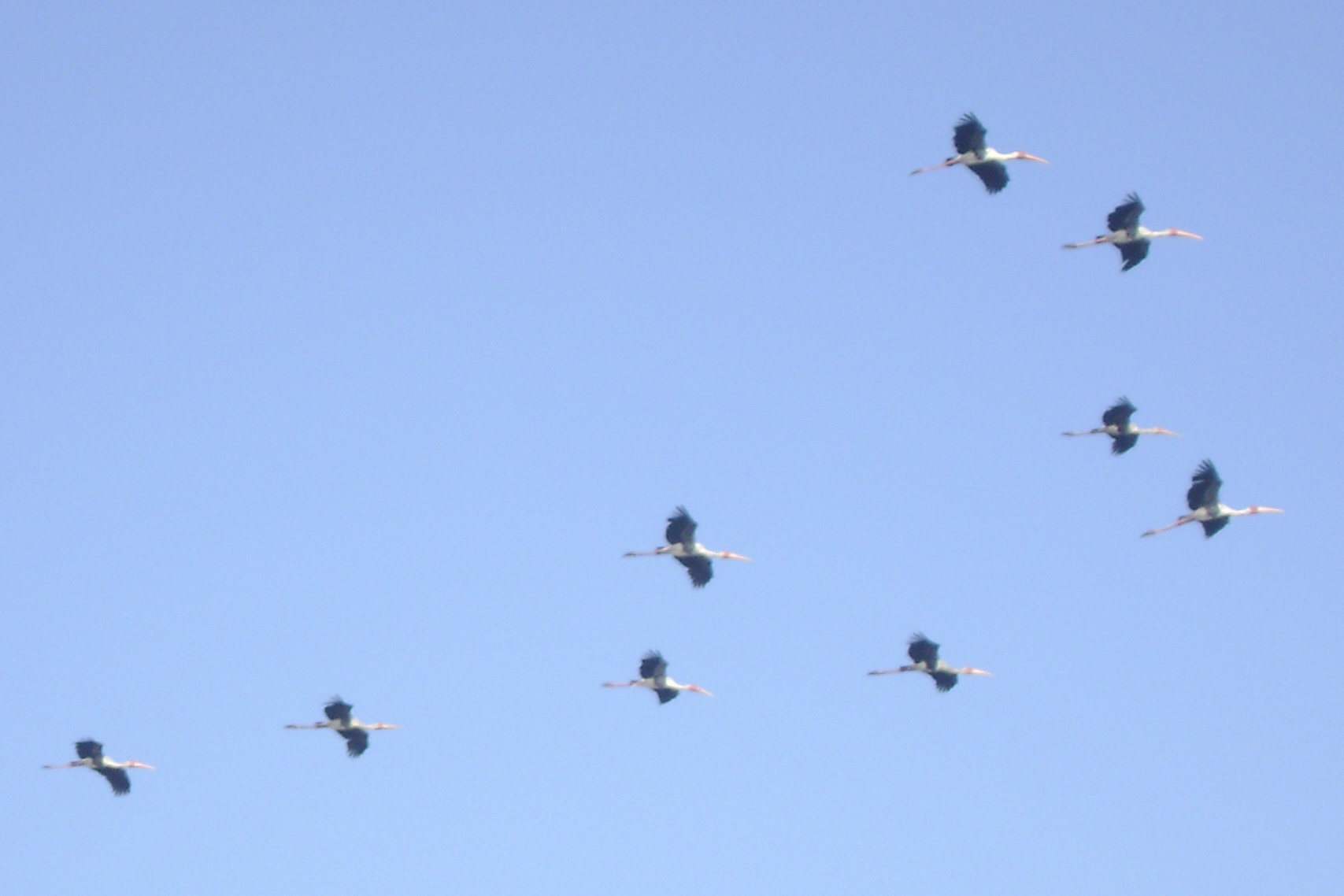
Flight of painted stork

The sanctuary hosts the second largest congregation of migratory waterbirds in India, with a peak population in excess of 100,000, representing 103 species. Over 200,000 birds have been captured, studied, ringed and released during the course of several ornithological studies in the past several years.

In October these waterbirds arrive from Rann of Kutch, Eastern Siberia, Northern Russia, Central Asia and parts of Europe for their feeding season and start returning to those breeding places in January. These waterbirds include threatened species such as spot-billed pelican, Nordmann's greenshank, spoonbill sandpiper and black-necked stork. Near threatened species include black-headed ibis, Asian dowitcher, lesser flamingo, spoonbill, darter and painted stork.

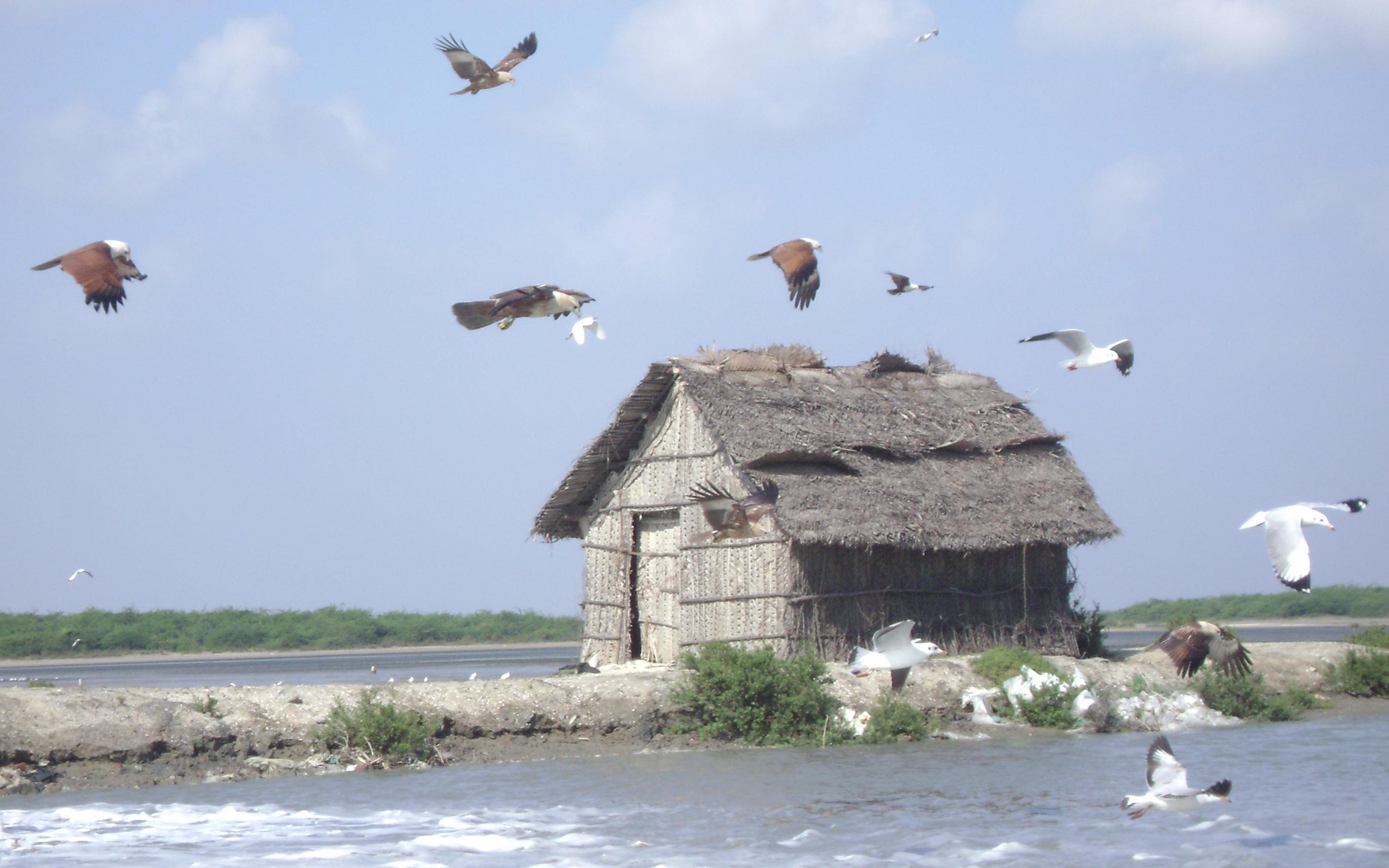
Brahminy kites and slender billed gulls

Over 15 km^{2} (5.8 sq mi) of the best tropical dry evergreen forest in India are in the sanctuary. They harbour a large variety of resident and migratory landbirds. The most common of the 35 resident species are white-browed bulbul, brahminy kite, small green-billed malkoha, crow pheasant, rose-ringed parakeet, grey partridge, blue-tailed bee-eater and common iora.

Spotted and collared doves are common in the mangroves.

== Threats ==
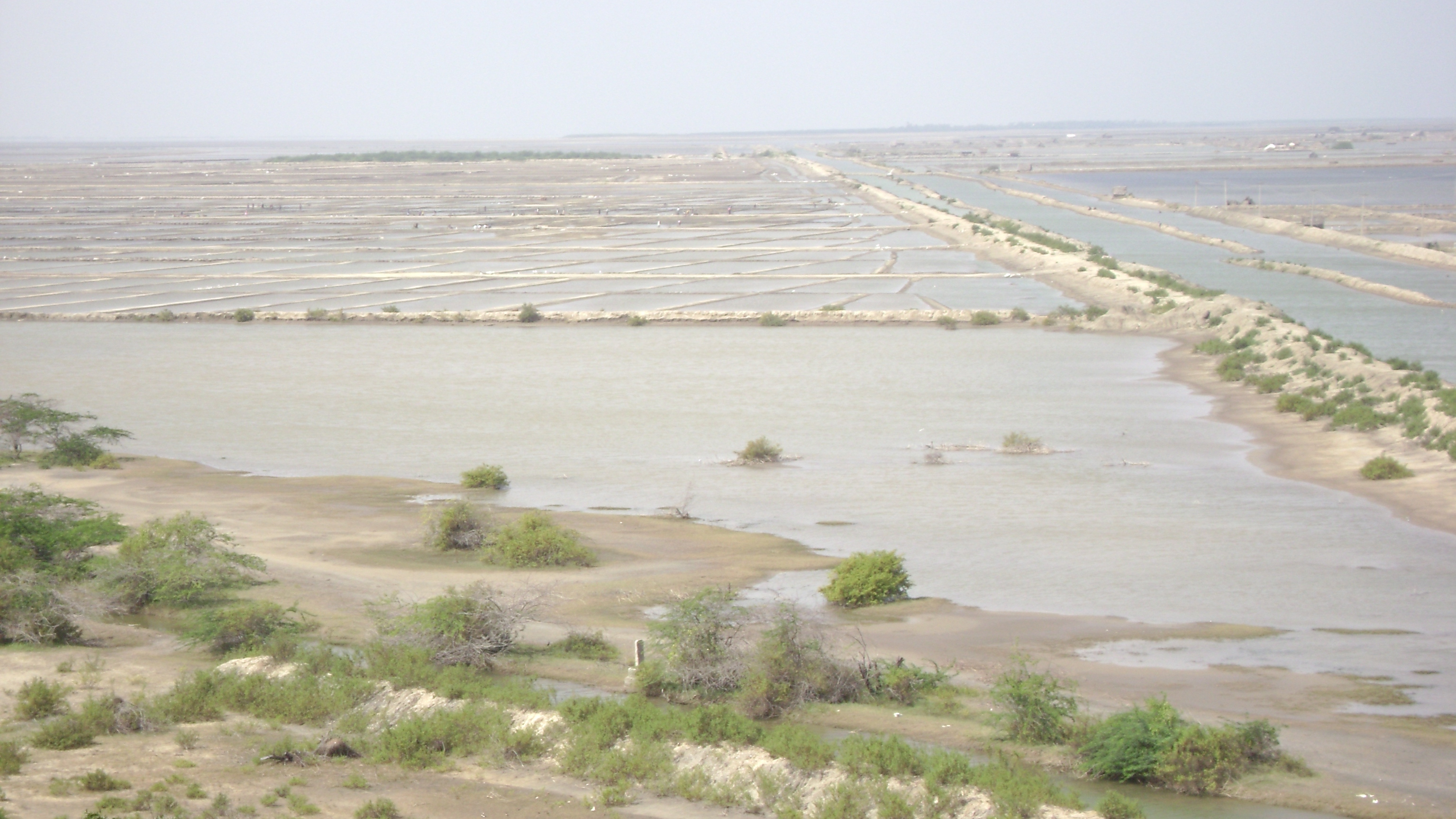
Salt pans

Major threats to the natural biodiversity and ecological balance of the sanctuary are: loss of habitat for waterbirds, soil and water salinisation by adjacent salt pans, spread of the invasive Prosopis juliflora, cattle grazing and scarcity of fresh water. Sanctuary staff conduct programs to alleviate all these issues.

== Cultural heritage ==
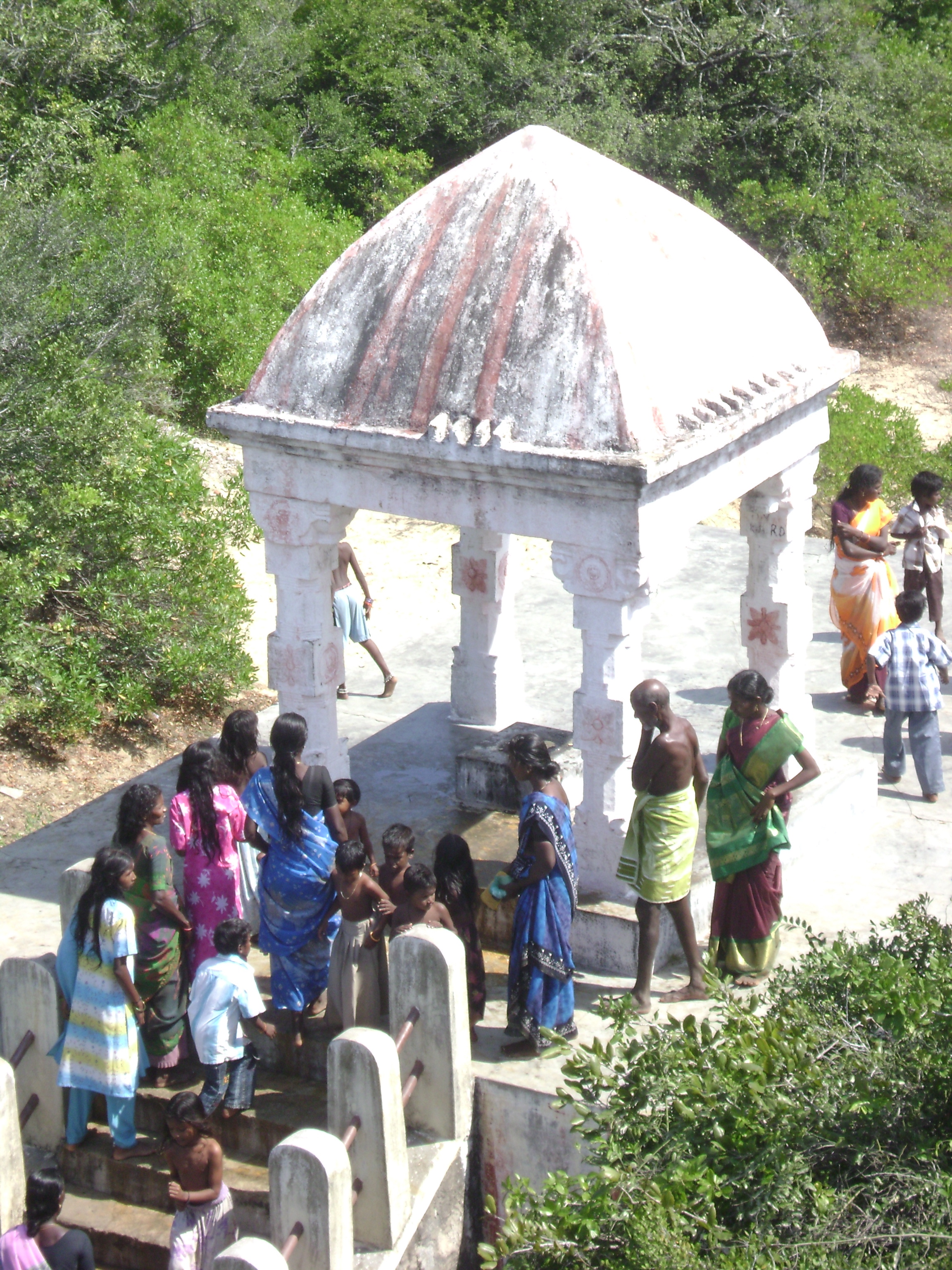
Ramar Padam shrine containing the footprints of Lord Rama in stone

Several sites of religious, historical or cultural importance are located within the sanctuary:

- Ramar Padam (literally: Ramas Footprint) located on the highest point of land in the sanctuary, is a small shrine containing the stone footprints of Lord Rama. Large numbers of Rama devotees gather here during the second week of April to celebrate Ram Navami Festival.
- Mattumunian Kovil is a small temple in the south of the sanctuary where people worship and offer prayers throughout the year. A major festival occurs here on the third Friday of September.
- Avulaiganni Dargah is the grave of a Muslim saint located near the road by Ramar Padam. His death anniversary is celebrated in late November.
- Shevrayan Kovil is a shrine to the deities Shevrayan and Soni located deep in the forests of the northern part of the sanctuary. A small village near this shrine was relocated outside the sanctuary after the creation of Kodaikarai Reserve Forest. A large congregation of devotees from Arcothurai celebrate a special festival in June and July.

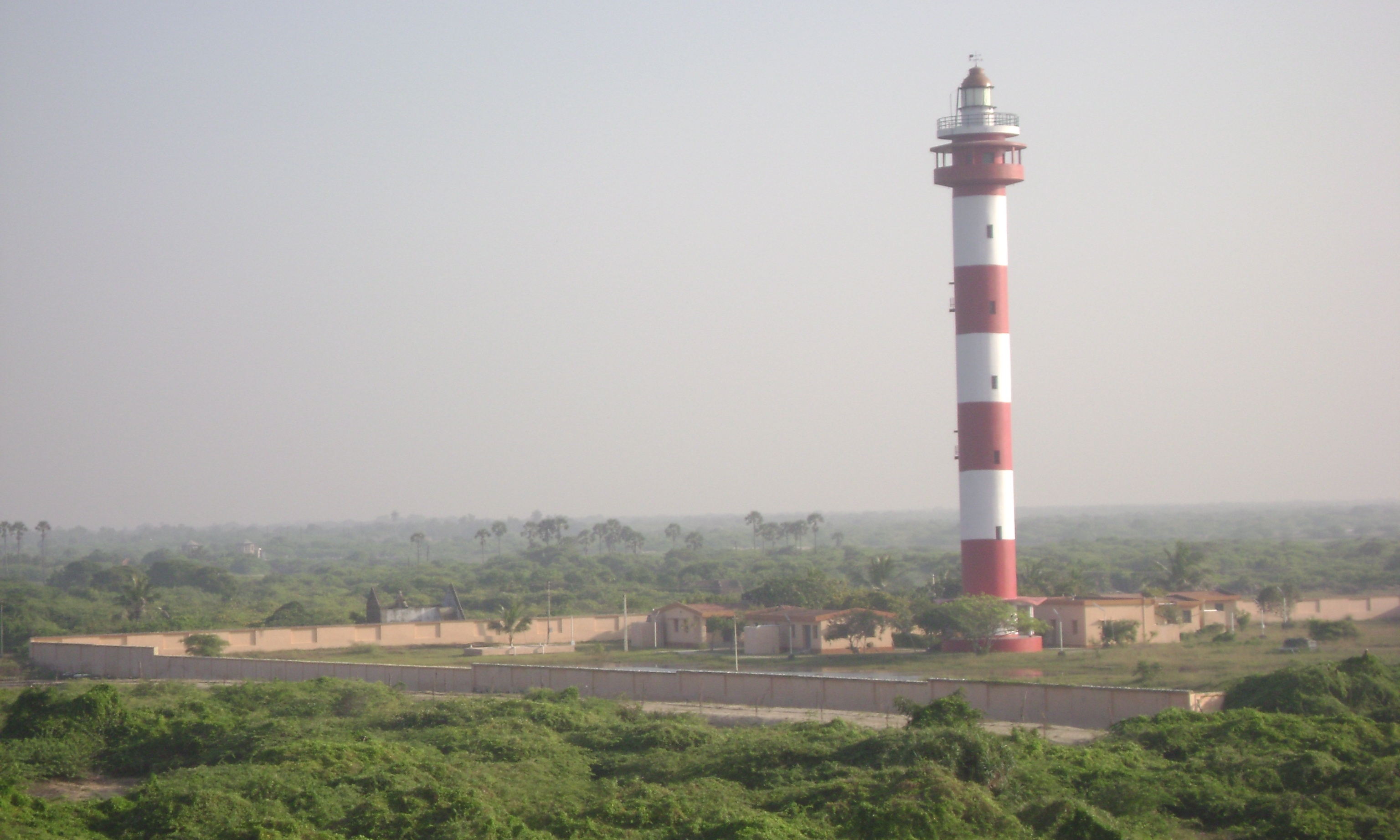
Kodaikarai Lighthouse near Kodaikorai Beach

- Chola Lighthouse is the remains of a brick and mortar lighthouse near Point Calimere said to have been built by the Cholas more than a thousand years ago. This structure was badly damaged by the 2004 Indian Ocean earthquake and tsunami but can still be seen in the intertidal zone near the British lighthouse.

== See also ==
- Point Calimere
- Kodi Kuzhagar temple
- List of birds of South India
