= Andrographis explicata =

Scientific classification
- Kingdom: Plantae
- Clade: Tracheophytes
- Clade: Angiosperms
- Clade: Eudicots
- Clade: Asterids
- Order: Lamiales
- Family: Acanthaceae
- Genus: Andrographis
- Species: A. explicata

Binomial name
- Andrographis explicata (C.B.Clarke) Gamble

Species of plant

Andrographis explicata is a species of flowering plant belonging to the genus Andrographis within the Acanthaceae family, primarily native to Southern India. This plant is an erect, woody undershrub endemic to the Southern Western Ghats of India. It grows up to 1 meter tall and has large, bristly, elliptic leaves and hairless stems. Its small, dark-purple flowers, borne in large pyramidal panicles, are characterized by a two-lobed upper lip and hairy lower lip. The plant produces long, hairy, linear-oblong capsules containing up to 12 seeds, and it typically flowers between August and December.
