= Godavari–Krishna mangroves =

Mangrove ecoregion of India's eastern coast

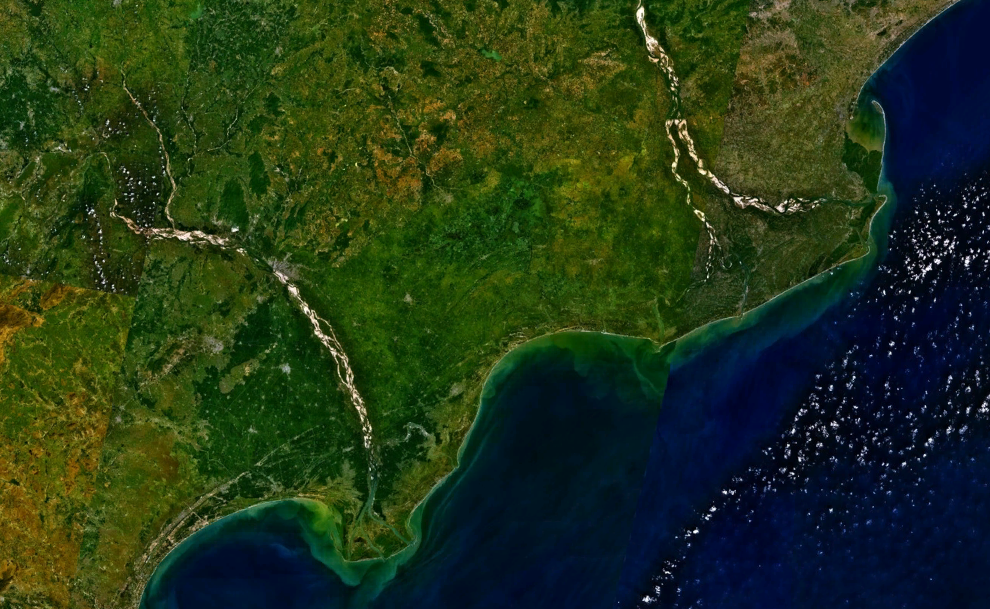
- Krishna River Delta (lower left) and Godavari River delta (upper right) imagery showing the green mangrove region.

Ecology
- Biome: Mangrove

Geography
- Area: 7,000 km^{2} (2,700 mi^{2})
- Country: India
- State: Andhra Pradesh, Odisha, Puducherry, Tamil Nadu

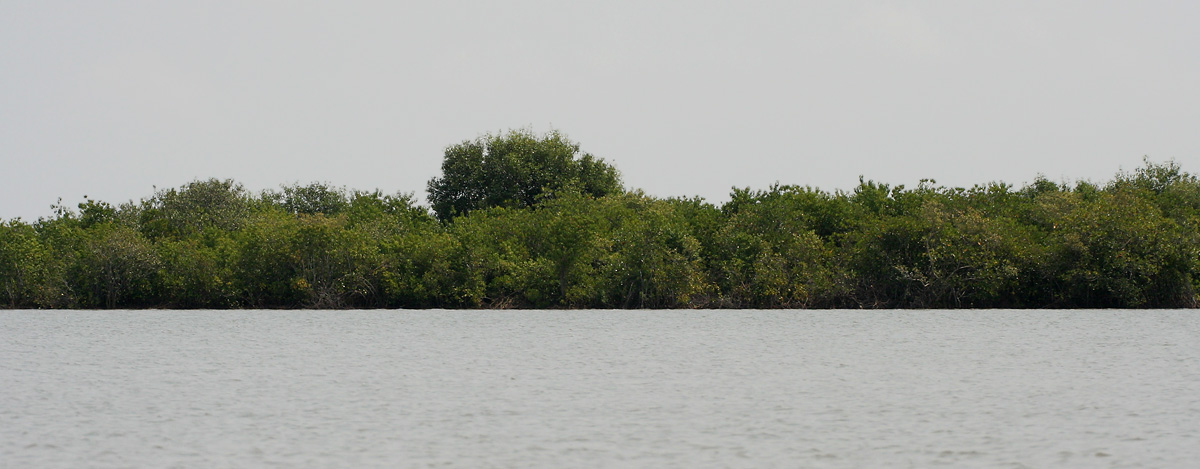
Mangroves in Krishna Delta region

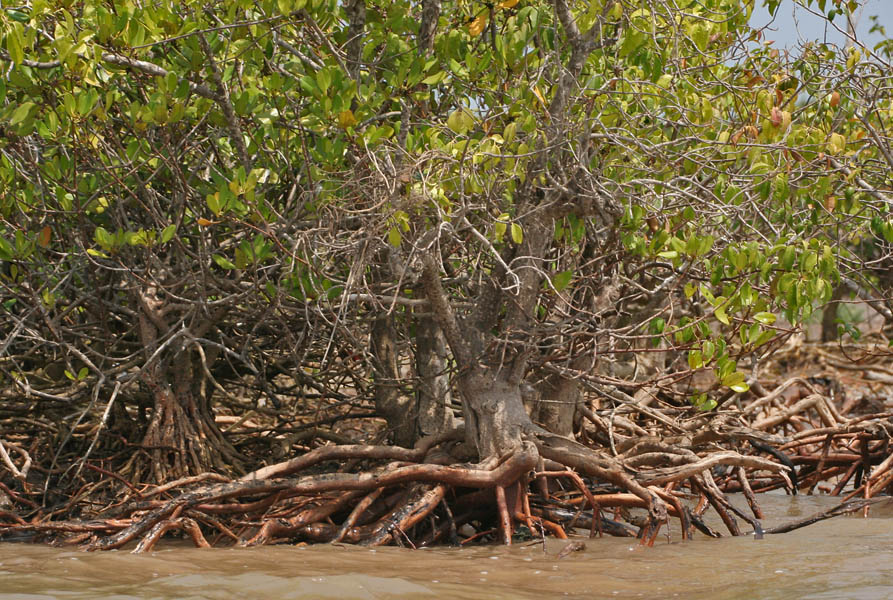
Excoecaria agallocha trees at Krishna Delta

The Godavari–Krishna mangroves are a mangrove ecoregion of India's eastern coast.

== Location and description ==
The ecoregion covers an area of 7,000 square kilometers (2,700 sq mi), in discontinuous enclaves extending from the state of Odisha in the north to Tamil Nadu in the south. The largest mangrove community in the ecoregion lies in the delta of the Godavari and Krishna rivers in Andhra Pradesh; other mangrove communities can be found at Point Calimere in Tamil Nadu, Pulicat Lake in Andhra Pradesh and Tamil Nadu, the Bhitarkanika Mangroves and Chilika Lake in Odisha, and the Pichavaram mangroves in Tamil Nadu.

== Flora ==
The predominant mangroves are all of the species include Avicennia marina, Suaeda spp., Rhizophora spp., and Bruguiera spp. These have a thick canopy and an undergrowth of climbing plants and shrubs.

== Fauna ==
Mangroves are an important coastal habitat for much wildlife such as the saltwater crocodiles who shelter among the roots and feed off the fish and other seafood in this warm mixture of fresh and seawater. These mangroves are home to many insects, molluscs, shrimp, crabs and fish as well as 140 bird species, including the threatened lesser florican (Eupodotis indica), best known for the male birds' leaping breeding displays, and large communities of aquatic birds such as egrets, flamingoes (Phoenicoptreus spp.), spot-billed pelicans (Pelecanus philippensis), Eurasian spoonbills (Platalea leucorodia), and painted storks (Mycteria leucocephala).

== Threats and preservation ==
Mangroves are vulnerable to coastal development including prawn farming, other agriculture that diverts fresh water from reaching the coast and seaside urbanisation. Most mangroves on the east coast of India have been cleared and while 14% of the ecoregion is under protection in Point Calimere Wildlife and Bird Sanctuary, Pulicat Lake Bird Sanctuary and the Bhitarkanika National Park even those areas are not secure.
