= Xiyanping =

Chemical compound

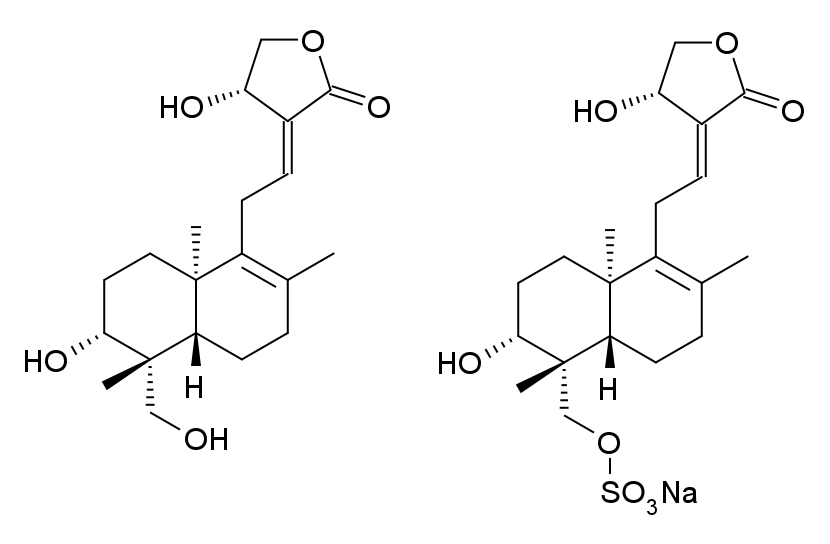

Identifiers
- IUPAC name: 9-dehydro-17-hydro-andrographolide and sodium 9-dehydro-17-hydro-andrographolide-19-yl sulfate
- CAS Number: 1418130-80-9; 1443513-92-5
- UNII: R4JE0B5I4U; Z5RVW4Z10Q

Xiyanping (喜炎平) is an anti-inflammatory and antiviral preparation developed and licensed for use in China. It is a semi-synthetic injectable product derived from the active component of the plant Andrographis paniculata (Chuan Xin Lian, 穿心蓮), which is used in Traditional Chinese medicine. Xiyanping is primarily composed of 9-dehydro-17-hydro-andrographolide and sodium 9-dehydro-17-hydro-andrographolide-19-yl sulfate. It is used mainly in the treatment of hand, foot and mouth disease, diarrhea, upper respiratory tract infections and viral pneumonia, though one case report suggested it may also be useful in the treatment of Zika fever.

== Side effects ==
Xiyanping injection may be associated with side effects typical of allergic reaction, most commonly erythema and pruritus around the injection site, but more rarely anaphylactic reactions may occur, which can be life-threatening. Also, andrographolide and related derivatives are known to be abortifacient, making xiyanping unsuitable for use in pregnant women.

== See also ==
- Artemisinin
- Forsythoside B
