= Point Calimere =

Headland in Nagapattinam, Tamil Nadu, India

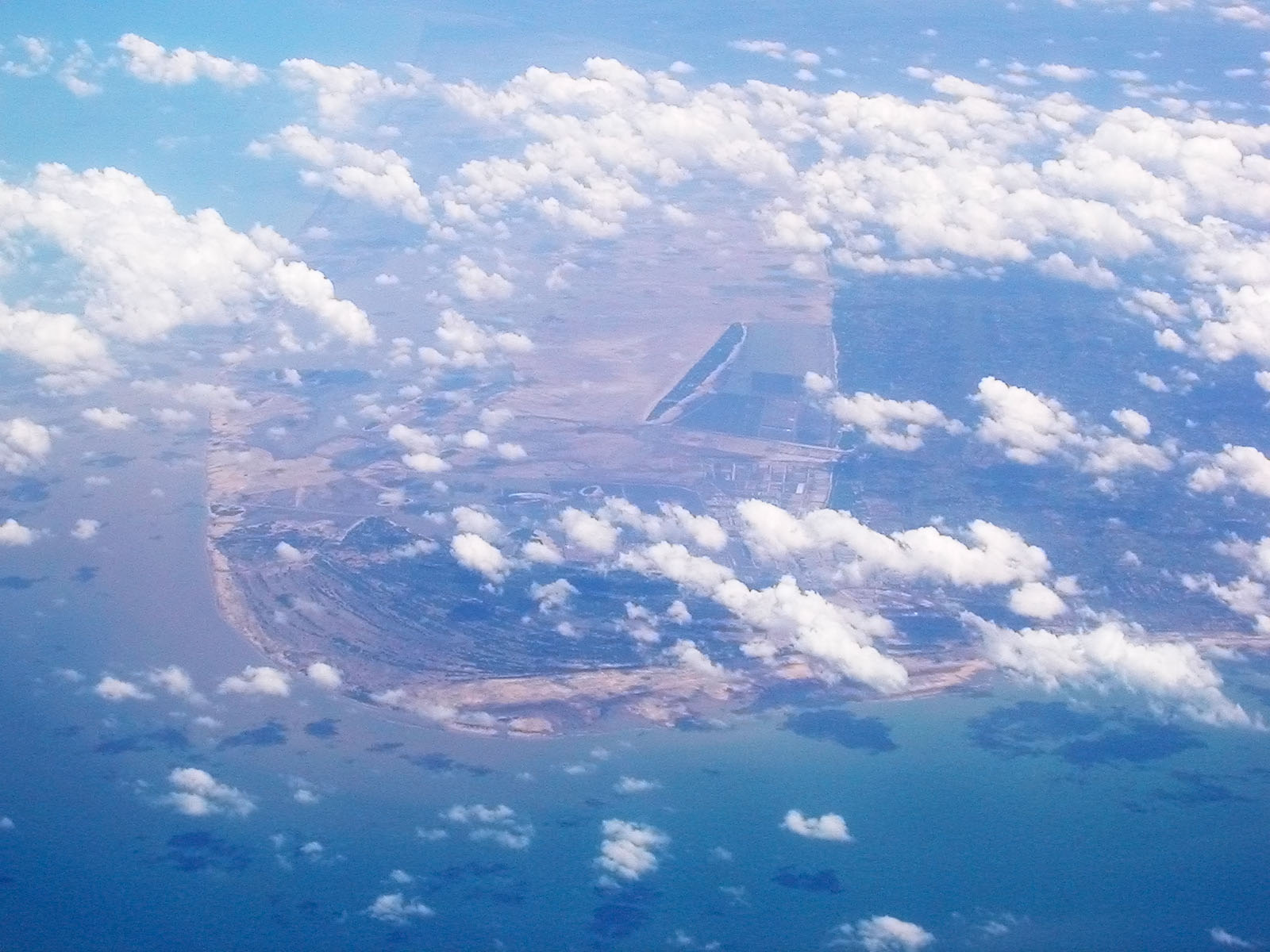
- Aerial view

- Kodiakkarai, Tamil Nadu

- Coordinates: 10°17′04.2″N 79°49′26.8″E Location of Point Calimere in the Indian coast

Point Calimere, also called Cape Calimere or Kodiakkarai, is a low headland of the Coromandel Coast, in the Nagapattinam district of the Indian state of Tamil Nadu. The Cape is located about 9 kilometres (5.6 mi) south of Vedaranyam in the Kaveri delta, and marks a nearly right-angle turn in the coastline. The antiquity of the area is evidenced by the Kodi Kuzhagar temple built during the Chola period, and a Chola lighthouse, which was destroyed in the 2004 Indian Ocean tsunami.

Kodiakkarai has been designated as a Ramsar site since August 2002. Point Calimere is also associated with the mythological Hindu epic, The Ramayana. The highest point of the cape, at an elevation of 4 metres (13 ft), is Ramarpatham, meaning "Rama's feet" in Tamil. A stone slab on the Cape bears the impressions of two feet and is said to be the place where Rama stood and reconnoitered Ravana's kingdom in Sri Lanka, which is 48 kilometres (30 mi) to the south of the Point. It is also mentioned by Kalki in his historical novel Ponniyin Selvan.

== Flora and fauna ==
The forests of Kodiakkarai, also known the Vedaranyam forests, are one of the last remnants of the dry evergreen forests that were once typical of East Deccan dry evergreen forests ecoregion. The Point Calimere Wildlife Sanctuary, with an area of 24.17 square kilometres (9.33 sq mi), was created on 13 June 1967.

The sanctuary includes the cape and its three types of habitat: dry evergreen forests, mangrove forests, and wetlands. In 1988, the sanctuary was enlarged to include the Great Vedaranyam Swamp and the Talaignayar Reserve Forest, and renamed the Point Calimere Wildlife and Bird Sanctuary, with a total area of 377 square kilometres (146 sq mi). Point Calimere is home to the endangered endemic Indian blackbuck and is one of the few known wintering locations of the spoon-billed sandpiper. It also holds large wintering populations of greater flamingos. The area is dotted with salt pans and these hold large crustacean populations that support the wintering bird life. Pesticide runoff from agricultural fields and shrimp farms has entered the ecosystem resulting in many species having high concentrations of DDT and HCH in their tissue.

== Cultural heritage ==
Several sites of religious, historical or cultural importance are located within the sanctuary:

- Ramar Padam (literally: Ramas Footprint) located on the highest point of land in the sanctuary, is a small shrine containing the stone footprints of Lord Rama. Large numbers of Rama devotees gather here during the second week of April to celebrate Ram Navami Festival.
- Kuzhagar Temple or Kodi Kuzhagar Temple (கோடிக் குழகர் கோயில்) (also called Amrithakadeswarar Temple) is a Hindu temple dedicated to Shiva, located in the town of Kodikkarai in Tamil Nadu, India. Kuzhagar is revered in the 7th century Tamil Saiva canonical work, the Tevaram, written by Tamil saint poets known as the nayanars and classified as Paadal Petra Sthalam. Kuzhagar temple is originally believed to have been built by the Cholas and it has several inscriptions dating back to the Chola period.
- Navakodi Sitthar Aalayam is a temple in south of the Kodiakkarai village. The history of this temple is the wedding ceremony of Lord Shiva and Parvathy ammaal have been attended by lot many Sitthars at this location. Chola Emperor and Mannar Sarafoji were visited this temple. A small village called "Kanakkar Madam" near this shrine was demolished by 1940s (around 80 years ago) and the people who were living there are relocated to Kodiakkarai village and they are still called as Kanakkarmadathiaar's family. A large congregation of devotees from all over Tamil Nadu state to come on special day of Amaavasai/Pournami to celebrate a special festival here every year. The greatest lord and the environment gives the peace like never ever feel.
- Sanyasin Muniaswar Kovil is a shrine between the eastern bank of Muniappan Lake and Kodiakkarai Road visited by devotees on all auspicious occasions. On 20 March a special Puja is celebrated here.
- Mattumunian Kovil is a small temple in the south of the sanctuary where people worship and offer prayers throughout the year. A major festival occurs here on the 3rd Friday of September.
- Modi Mandapam is a shrine located near Ramar Padam where people of all castes worship. Hindu legend says that Lord Vedaraneswarer spends a night here with his consort during January - February. In the first week of March a major festival is held here.
- Avulaiganni Dargah is the grave of a Muslim saint located near the road by Ramar Padam. His death anniversary is observed here at the end of November.
- Shevrayan Kovil is a shrine to the deities Shevrayan and Soni located deep in the forests of the northern part of the sanctuary. A small village near this shrine was relocated outside the sanctuary after the creation of Kodiakkarai Reserve Forest. A large congregation of devotees from Arcothurai celebrate a special festival here in June/July.
- Adivasi Colony is a community of Ambalakars living in huts of mud, coconut fronds and palmyrah leaves on the edge of Kodiakkarai village. Their traditional livelihood was the collection of non-timber forest products in the areas that are now the sanctuary. These practices are now prohibited but not fully eliminated. Many of these people catch fish and small prawns in the nearby mudflats and swamps. Some work as day labourers in the nearby salt pans. They have little interaction with other communities on the island.
- Chola Lighthouse is the remains of a brick and mortar lighthouse near Point Calimerem. It is said to have been built by the Cholas more than a thousand years ago. This structure was badly damaged by the 2004 Indian Ocean Tsunami but can still be seen in the intertidal zone near the British lighthouse.
- British Lighthouse is a 13-metre (43 ft) tall operating lighthouse built by the British at the tip of Point Calemere in 1890 and can be seen 13 nautical miles (24 km; 15 mi) at sea.
- Kodiakkarai Lighthouse is a 45-metre (148 ft) tall modern aid to navigation located near Kodiakkarai Beach and is accessible to the public between 1500 - 1700hrs. This dominates the sanctuary and may be seen by seamen far at sea.

== Gallery ==
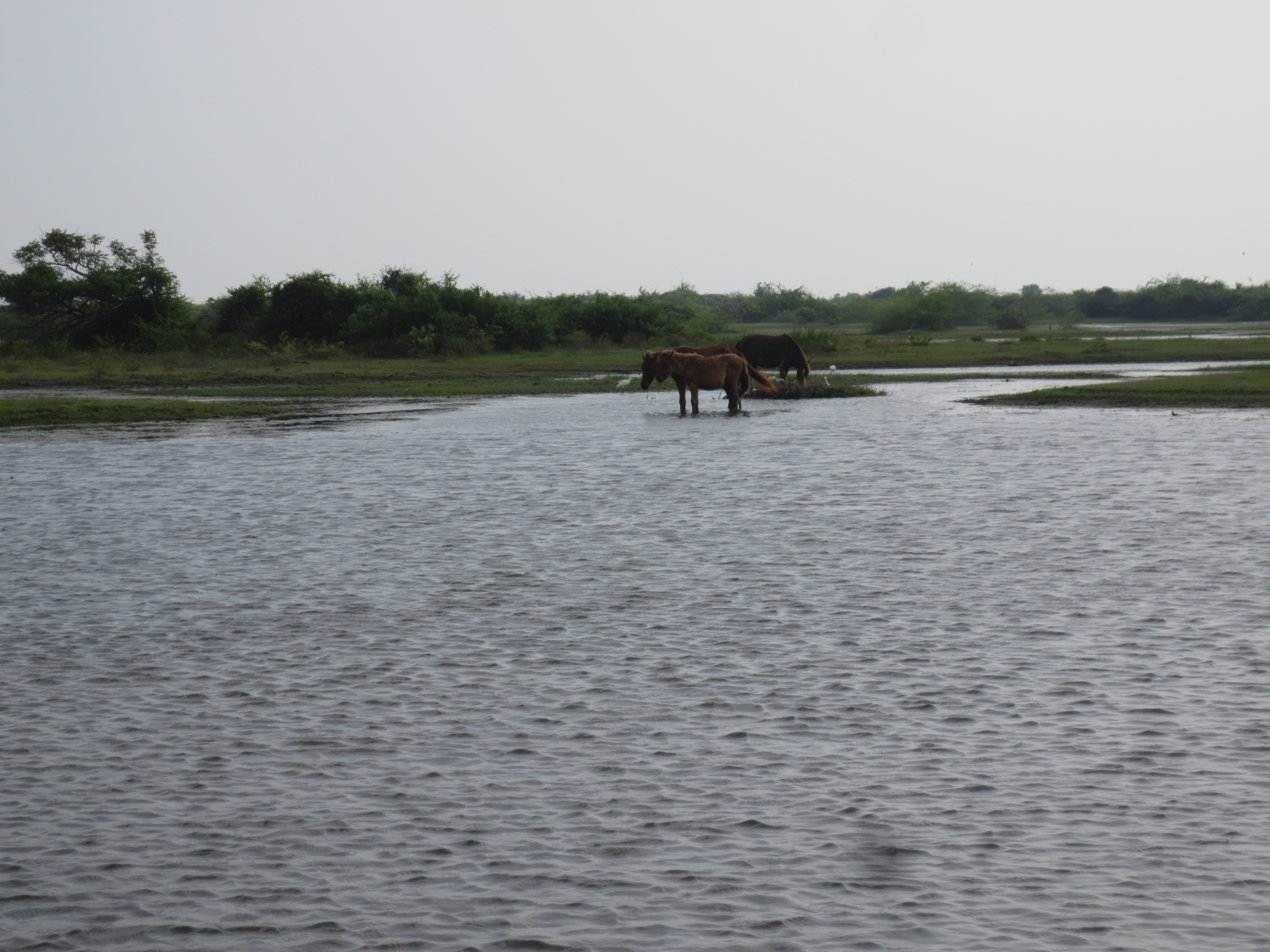
Horses

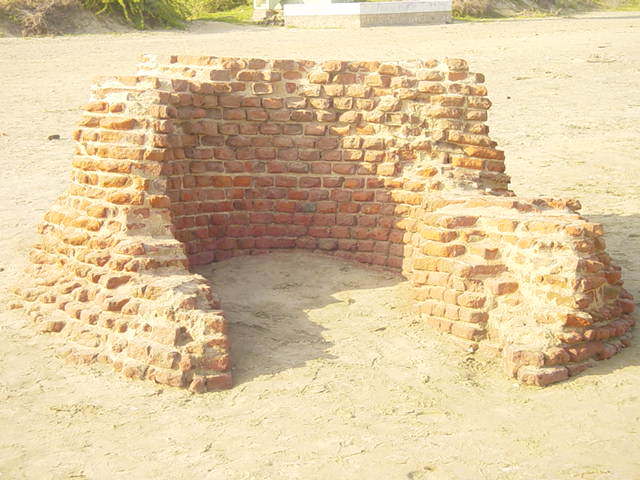
Remains of the beacon of Chola Albanske devastated by the tsunami

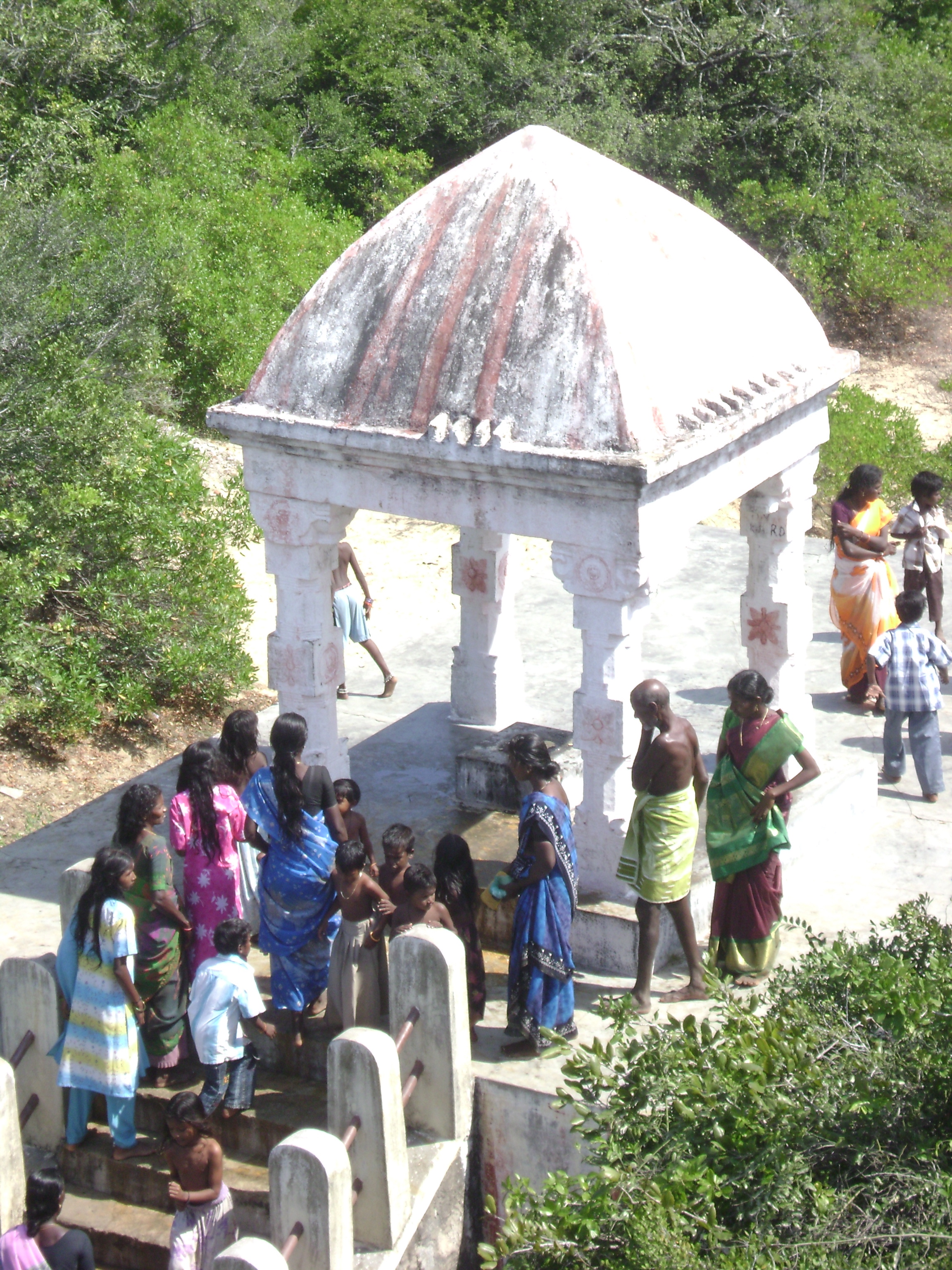
Ramar Padam shrine containing the footprints of Lord Rama in stone

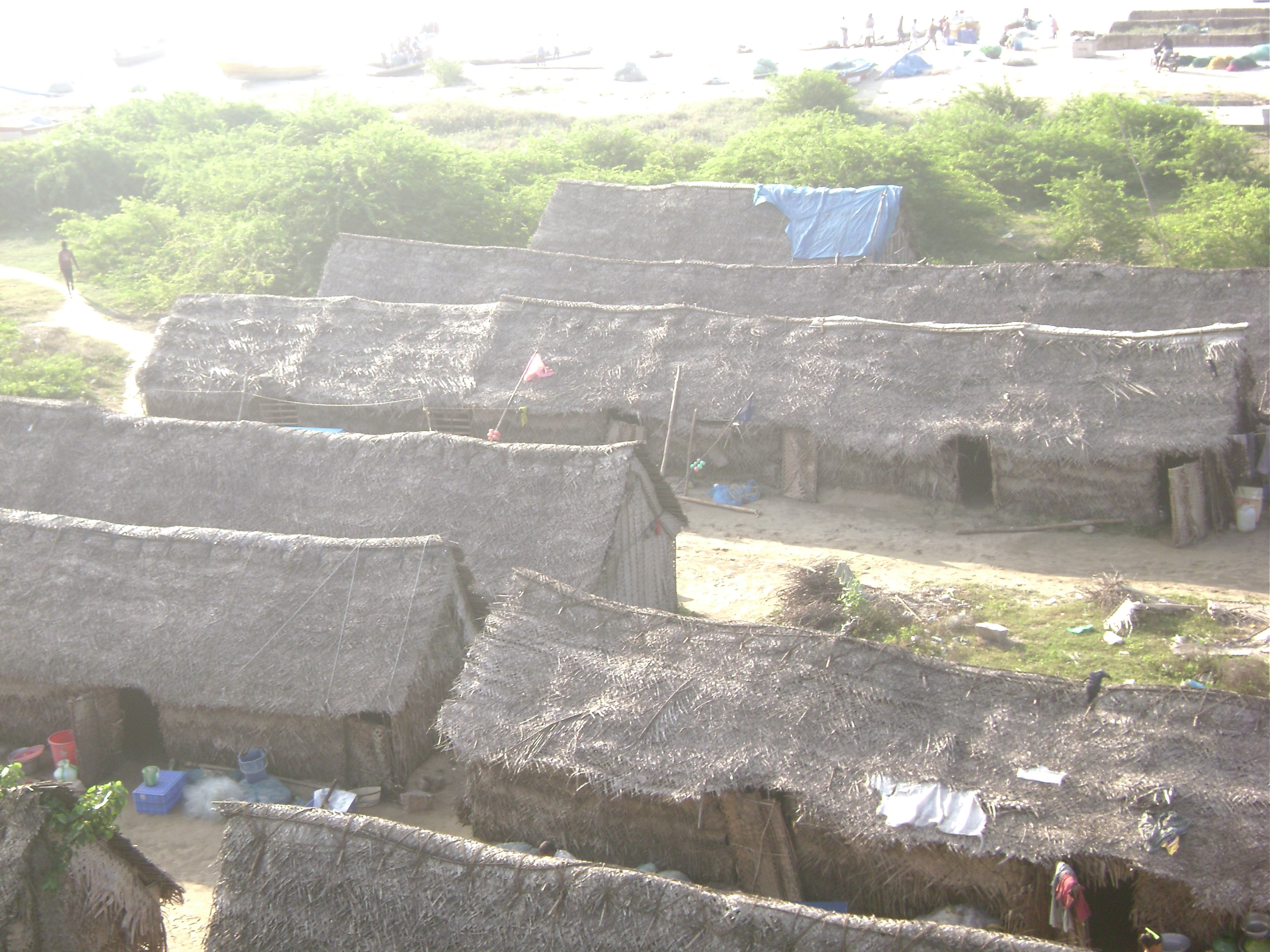
Adivasi Colony

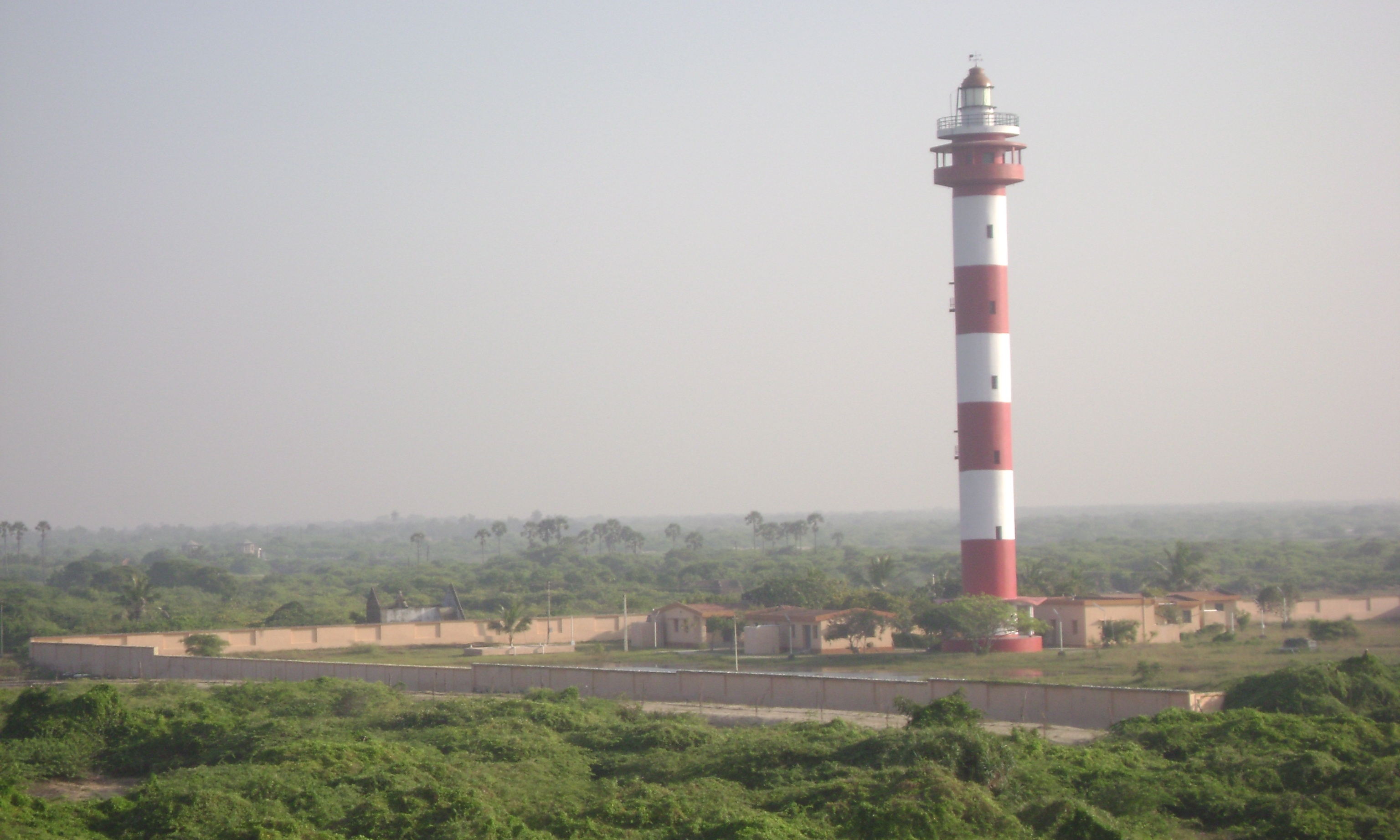
Kodiakkarai Lighthouse near Kodiakkarai Beach

== See also ==
- Kodi Kuzhagar temple
- Point Calimere Wildlife and Bird Sanctuary
- List of birds of South India
