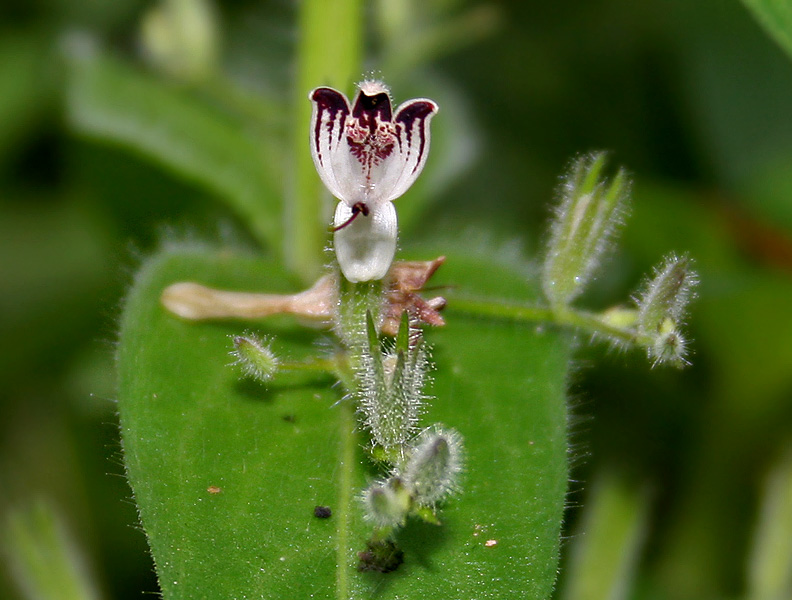
- Andrographis echioides

Scientific classification
- Kingdom: Plantae
- Clade: Tracheophytes
- Clade: Angiosperms
- Clade: Eudicots
- Clade: Asterids
- Order: Lamiales
- Family: Acanthaceae
- Subfamily: Acanthoideae
- Tribe: Andrographideae
- Genus: Andrographis; Wall. ex Nees (1832)

Species
- See text

Synonyms
- Erianthera Nees (1832); Indoneesiella Sreem. (1968); Neesiella Sreem. (1967), nom. illeg.

= Andrographis =

Genus of flowering plants

Andrographis is a genus of flowering plants in the family Acanthaceae. They may be generally known as the false waterwillows, and several are called periyanagai.

The species are native to the Indian subcontinent (including Myanmar, Sri Lanka and the West Himalaya region). Many are endemic to India. They may be herbs or shrubs. They are introduced and/or cultivated in Southeast Asia and some areas around the Caribbean.

Some species are used medicinally. The best known is Andrographis paniculata, which is valued in Ayurveda, Unani, and Siddha medicine. It is used to treat a very long list of illnesses and conditions. A. alata and A. lineata are used in human and veterinary medicine. Food use has also been recorded.

It is currently (as of April 2021) accepted that there are 26 species in the genus. These are:

- Andrographis affinis Nees
- Andrographis alata (Vahl) Nees
- Andrographis atropurpurea (Dennst.) Alston
- Andrographis beddomei C.B.Clarke
- Andrographis chendurunii E.S.S.Kumar, A.E.S.Khan & S.G.Gopal
- Andrographis echioides (L.) Nees
- Andrographis elongata (Vahl) T.Anderson
- Andrographis explicata (C.B.Clarke) Gamble
- Andrographis glandulosa (B.Heyne ex Roth) Nees
- Andrographis gracilis Nees
- Andrographis lawsonii Gamble
- Andrographis lineata Nees
- Andrographis lobelioides Wight
- Andrographis longipedunculata (Sreem.) L.H.Cramer ex Karthik. & Moorthy
- Andrographis macrobotrys Nees
- Andrographis megamalayana Gnanasek., Karupp. & G.V.S.Murthy
- Andrographis neesiana Wight
- Andrographis paniculata (Burm.f.) Nees - Indian subcontinent (native), SE Asia (cultivated)
- Andrographis producta (C.B.Clarke) Gamble
- Andrographis rothii C.B.Clarke
- Andrographis rotundifolia (Sreem.) Sreem.
- Andrographis serpyllifolia (Rottler ex Vahl) Wight
- Andrographis stellulata C.B.Clarke
- Andrographis stenophylla C.B.Clarke
- Andrographis subspathulata C.B.Clarke
- Andrographis viscosula Nees
