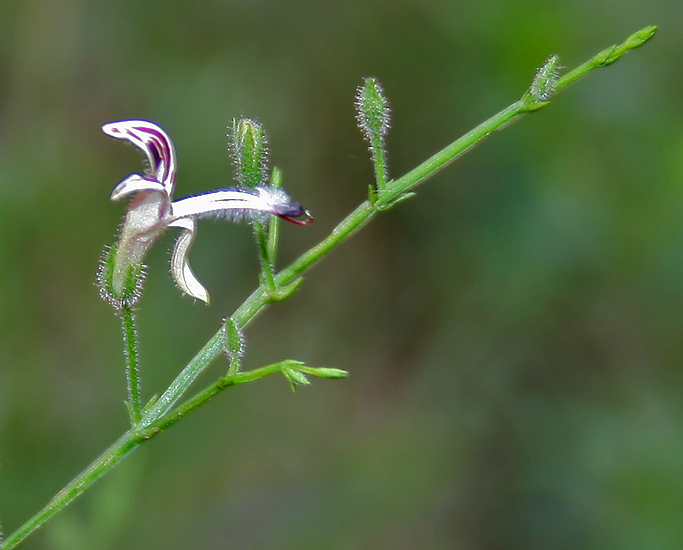

Scientific classification
- Kingdom: Plantae
- Clade: Tracheophytes
- Clade: Angiosperms
- Clade: Eudicots
- Clade: Asterids
- Order: Lamiales
- Family: Acanthaceae
- Genus: Andrographis
- Species: A. paniculata

Binomial name
- Andrographis paniculata (Burm.f.) Nees

Synonyms
- Justicia latebrosa Russell ex Wall.; Justicia paniculata Burm.f.; Justicia stricta Lam. ex Steud.

= Andrographis paniculata =

Species of flowering plant

Andrographis paniculata, commonly known as creator green chiretta, is an annual herbaceous plant in the family Acanthaceae, native to India and Sri Lanka.

It is widely cultivated in Southern and Southeastern Asia, where it has been believed to be a treatment for bacterial infections and some diseases. Mostly the leaves and roots have been used for such purposes; the whole plant is also used, in some cases.

== Description ==
The plant grows as an erect herb to a height of 30–110 cm (12–43 in) in moist, shady places. The slender stem is dark green, square in cross-section with longitudinal furrows and wings along the angles. The lance-shaped leaves have hairless blades measuring up to 8 cm (3.1 in) long by 2.5 cm (0.98 in). The small flowers are pink, solitary, arranged in lax spreading racemes or panicles. The fruit is a capsule around 2 cm (0.79 in) long and a few millimeters wide. It contains many yellow-brown seeds. The seeds are subquadrate, rugose and glabrous. The flowering time is September to December.

== Distribution ==
The species is distributed in tropical Asian countries, often in isolated patches. It can be found in a variety of habitats, such as plains, hillsides, coastlines, and disturbed and cultivated areas such as roadsides and farms. Native populations of A. paniculata are spread throughout south India and Sri Lanka which perhaps represent the center of origin and diversity of the species. The herb is an introduced species in northern parts of India, Java, Malaysia, Indonesia, the West Indies, and elsewhere in the Americas. The species also occurs in the Philippines, Hong Kong, Thailand, Brunei, Singapore, and other parts of Asia where it may or may not be native. The plant is cultivated in many areas, as well.

Unlike other species of the genus, A. paniculata is of common occurrence in most places in India, including the plains and hilly areas up to 500 m (1,600 ft), which accounts for its wide use.

In India the major source of plant is procured from its wild habitat. The plant is categorised as Low Risk or of Least Concern by the IUCN. Under the trade name Kalmegh, on average 2,000–5,000 tonnes (2,200–5,500 tons) of the plant is traded in India.

== Cultivation ==
The plant does best in a sunny location. The seeds are sown during May and June (northern hemisphere). The seedlings are transplanted at a distance of 60 cm (24 in) × 30 cm (12 in).

== Vernacular names ==
- creat (English)
- green chireta (English)
- king of bitter
- phtuhs' (smau) (phtuhs'="explosion", smau="grass", referring to sound of its ripe fruit opening, Khmer language)
- 穿心莲, chuan xin lian (Standard Chinese)
- roi des amers (French)

== Uses and potential allergenicity ==
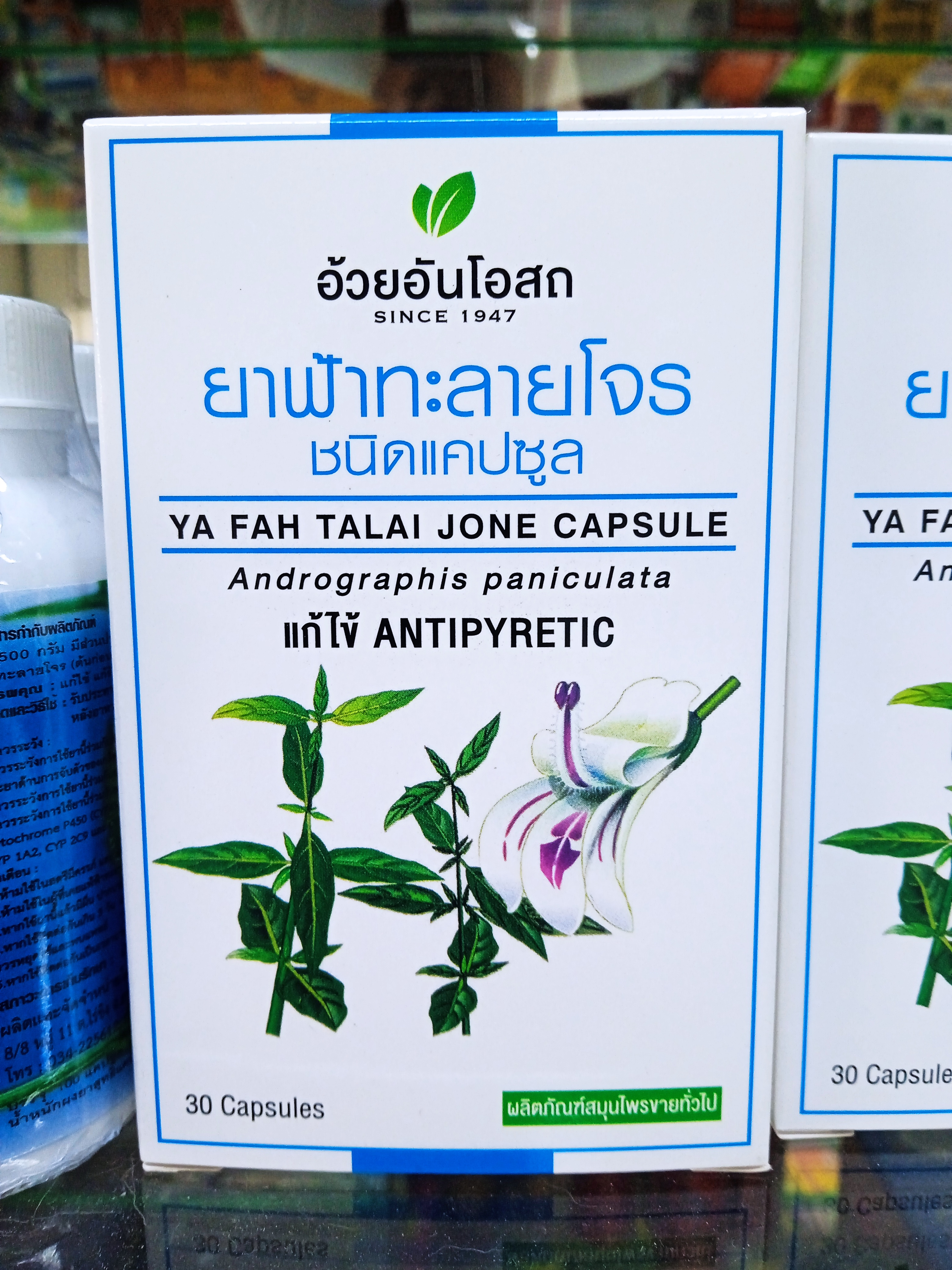
Andrographis paniculata capsule in Thailand

Andrographis paniculata is widely used in the indigenous folk, tribal, Ayurvedic and Siddha medicine systems of India, mainly for its claimed antiviral and anti-inflammatory effects, though these uses have not yet undergone rigorous pharmacological study.

A 2019 review found that while A. paniculata extracts, and its main compound of interest, andrographolide, have potential for immunomodulatory, antiviral, anti-inflammatory, antidiabetic and hepatoprotective activity matching the claims of its traditional uses, it also has poor solubility, low potency and insufficient documentation and processes for determining appropriate dosages, quality control and safety that currently prevents further development of it as a reliable pharmacological intervention.

Further, several polyherbal formulations containing the extract have been documented to have led some cases of severe allergic reactions, leading to warnings by trade and government agencies, though the etiology and causative agent is still unclear.

This has led to interest in developing the processes for its natural extract as well as in creating semi-synthetic derivatives. One such derivative is the injectable xiyanping; limited studies indicate this compound has increased potency and efficacy for viral diseases with a reasonably low rate of adverse reactions though cases of severe and life-threatening allergic reactions have been documented with this too, as with the natural extract.

=== Food ===
In Cambodia, the dried root macerated in alcohol is consumed as an apéritif, while the seeds make a black jelly called chahuoy khmau.

== Chemistry ==
Andrographolide is the major constituent extracted from the leaves of the plant and is a bicyclic diterpenoid lactone. This bitter principle was isolated in pure form by Gorter in 1911. Systematic studies on chemistry of A. paniculata have been carried out.

Some known constituents are:

- 14-Deoxy-11-dehydroandrographolide, plant
- 14-Deoxy-11-oxoandrographolide, plant
- 5-Hydroxy-7,8,2',3'-Tetramethoxyflavone, plant
- 5-Hydroxy-7,8,2'-Trimethoxyflavone, tissue culture
- Andrographine, root
- Andrographolide, plant
- Neoandrographolide, plant
- Panicoline, root
- Paniculide-A, plant
- Paniculide-B, plant
- Paniculide-C, plant

== See also ==
- List of ineffective cancer treatments
- Xiyanping
