= Prostaglandin E3 =

Chemical compound

Clinical data
- AHFS/Drugs.com: International Drug Names

Identifiers
- IUPAC name: (Z)-7-[(1R,2R,3R)-3-hydroxy-2-[(1E,3S,5Z)-3-hydroxyocta-1,5-dienyl]-5-oxocyclopentyl]hept-5-enoic acid
- CAS Number: 802-31-3
- PubChem CID: 5280937
- ChemSpider: 4444439
- UNII: ZED6SBL53S
- ChEBI: CHEBI:28031
- ChEMBL: ChEMBL2074717
- CompTox Dashboard (EPA): DTXSID301045731

Chemical and physical data
- Formula: C_{20}H_{30}O_{5}
- Molar mass: 350.455 g·mol^{−1}
- 3D model (JSmol): Interactive image
- SMILES: CC/C=C\C[C@@H](/C=C/[C@H]1[C@@H](CC(=O)[C@@H]1C/C=C\CCCC(=O)O)O)O
- InChI: InChI=1S/C20H30O5/c1-2-3-6-9-15(21)12-13-17-16(18(22)14-19(17)23)10-7-4-5-8-11-20(24)25/h3-4,6-7,12-13,15-17,19,21,23H,2,5,8-11,14H2,1H3,(H,24,25)/b6-3-,7-4-,13-12+/t15-,16+,17+,19+/m0/s1; Key:CBOMORHDRONZRN-QLOYDKTKSA-N

Prostaglandin E3 (PGE3) is a naturally formed prostaglandin and is formed via the cyclooxygenase (COX) metabolism of eicosapentaenoic acid.

== See also ==
- Prostaglandin E1 (PGE1)
- Prostaglandin E2 (PGE2)
