= Andrographolide =

- Andrographolide

Names
- IUPAC name 3-[2-[Decahydro-6-hydroxy-5-(hydroxymethyl)-5,8a-dimethyl-2-methylene-1-napthalenyl]ethylidene]dihydro-4-hydroxy-2(3H)-furanone

Identifiers
CAS Number	5508-58-7
3D model (JSmol)	Interactive image; Interactive image
ChEBI	CHEBI:65408
ChEMBL	ChEMBL186141
ChemSpider	16735664
ECHA InfoCard	100.024.411
PubChem CID	5318517
UNII	410105JHGR
CompTox Dashboard (EPA)	DTXSID3045980
- InChI: InChI=1S/C20H30O5/c1-12-4-7-16-19(2,9-8-17(23)20(16,3)11-21)14(12)6-5-13-15(22)10-25-18(13)24/h5,14-17,21-23H,1,4,6-11H2,2-3H3/b13-5+/t14-,15?,16+,17-,19+,20?/m1/s1 Key: BOJKULTULYSRAS-FNTFRYDESA-N; InChI=1/C20H30O5/c1-12-4-7-16-19(2,9-8-17(23)20(16,3)11-21)14(12)6-5-13-15(22)10-25-18(13)24/h5,14-17,21-23H,1,4,6-11H2,2-3H3 Key: BOJKULTULYSRAS-UHFFFAOYAB; InChI=1/C20H30O5/c1-12-4-7-16-19(2,9-8-17(23)20(16,3)11-21)14(12)6-5-13-15(22)10-25-18(13)24/h5,14-17,21-23H,1,4,6-11H2,2-3H3/b13-5+/t14-,15?,16+,17-,19+,20?/m1/s1 Key: BOJKULTULYSRAS-FNTFRYDEBY
- SMILES: O=C3OCC(O)C3=CCC1\C(=C)CCC2C(C)(CO)C(O)CCC12C; OC3COC(=O)\C3=C\C[C@@H]1C(=C)CC[C@@H]2C(C)(CO)[C@H](O)CC[C@@]12C

Properties
Chemical formula	C_{20}H_{30}O_{5}
Molar mass	350.455 g·mol^{−1}
Appearance	Rhombic prisms or plates from ethanol or methanol
Density	1.2317 g/cm^{3}
Melting point	230 to 231 °C (446 to 448 °F; 503 to 504 K)
Solubility in water	Sparingly soluble

Related compounds
Related labdanes	14-deoxyandrographolide
Related compounds	Xiyanping
- Except where otherwise noted, data are given for materials in their standard state (at 25 °C [77 °F], 100 kPa). verify (what is ?) Infobox references

Andrographolide is a labdane diterpenoid that has been isolated from the stem and leaves of Andrographis paniculata. Andrographolide is an extremely bitter substance.

Andrographolide has been studied for its effects on cell signaling, immunomodulation, and stroke. Study has shown that andrographolide may bind to a spectrum of protein targets including NF-κB and actin by covalent modification.

Andrographolide is a non-ATP-competitive, substrate-competitive GSK-3β inhibitor. When the substrate concentration is 25μM, the IC_{50} of andrographolide for GSK-3β is 5.58±0.40μM. When the substrate concentration is increased to 90μM, the IC_{50} increases to 37.7μM.

== Biosynthesis ==
While andrographolide is a relatively simple diterpene lactone, the biosynthesis by Andrographis paniculata was determined in the 2010s. Andrographolide is a member of the isoprenoid family of natural products. The precursors to isoprenoid biosynthesis, isopentenyl pyrophosphate (IPP) and dimethylallyl pyrophosphate (DMAPP), can be synthesized through either the mevalonic acid pathway (MVA) or deoxyxylulose pathway (DXP). Through selective C13 labeling of the precursors to both the MVA and DXP pathways, it was determined that the majority of the andrographolide precursors are synthesized through the DXP pathway. There are a small portion of andrographolide precursors synthesized through the MVA pathway. The biosynthesis of andrographolide begins with the addition of IPP to DMAPP, which forms geranyl pyrophosphate. Another molecule of IPP is then added, yielding farnesyl pyrophosphate (FPP). The final IPP molecule is added to the FPP to complete the backbone of the diterpene. The double bond originating from DMAPP is oxidized to an epoxide prior to the ring closing cascade that forms two six-membered rings. A series of oxidations form a five-membered lactone in addition to adding on the alcohol groups. The order of these post-synthetic modifications is not entirely known.

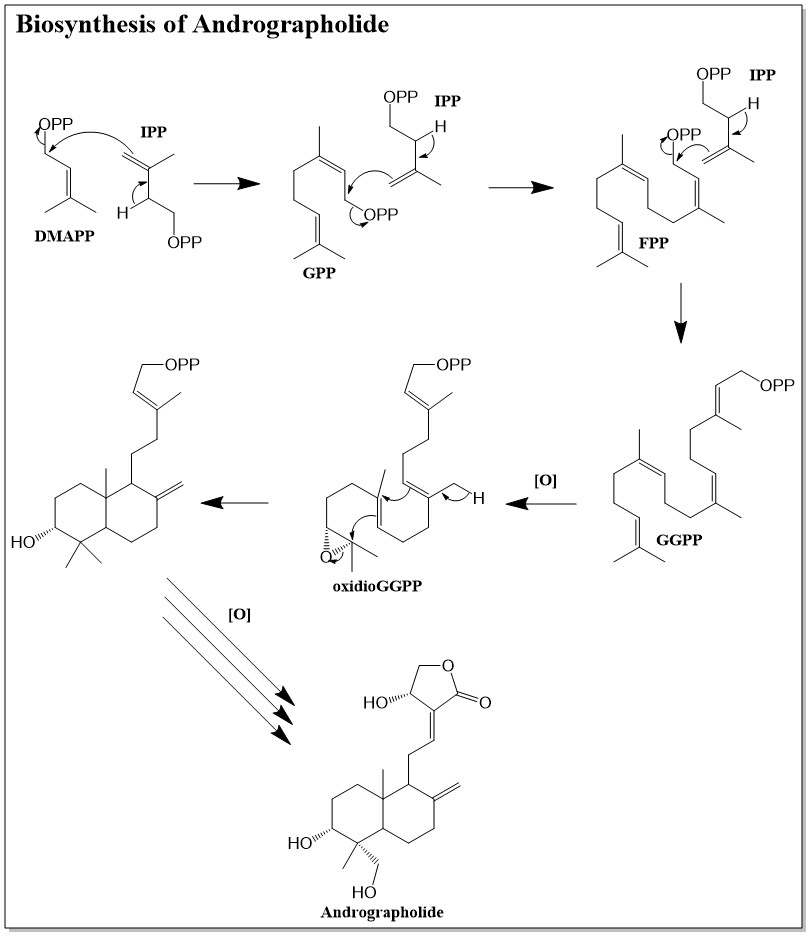
Biosynthesis of andrographolide

== Research ==
In 2022, a research found that the combinatorial drug of guaifenesin and andrographolide has potential anticonvulsant activity using network virtual screening. The possible mechanism of action is the two drugs synergistically affect NMDA receptors.

== See also ==
- Xiyanping WINDOSE-Tablet
