= Ghat (mountain) =

Mountain ranges in India

Ghat is a term used in the Indian subcontinent to refer to the range of stepped hills such as the Western and Eastern Ghats. As per linguist Thomas Burrow, the word Ghat was derived from similar words used in various Dravidian languages such as kattu (mountain side, ridge, or dam) in Tamil, katte (dam), gatta (mountain), and gattu (bank or shore) in Kannada, and katta (dam) and gatte (shore or embankment) in Telugu.
