= Kodi Kuzhagar Temple =

Shiva temple in Tamil Nadu, India

Kuzhagar Temple
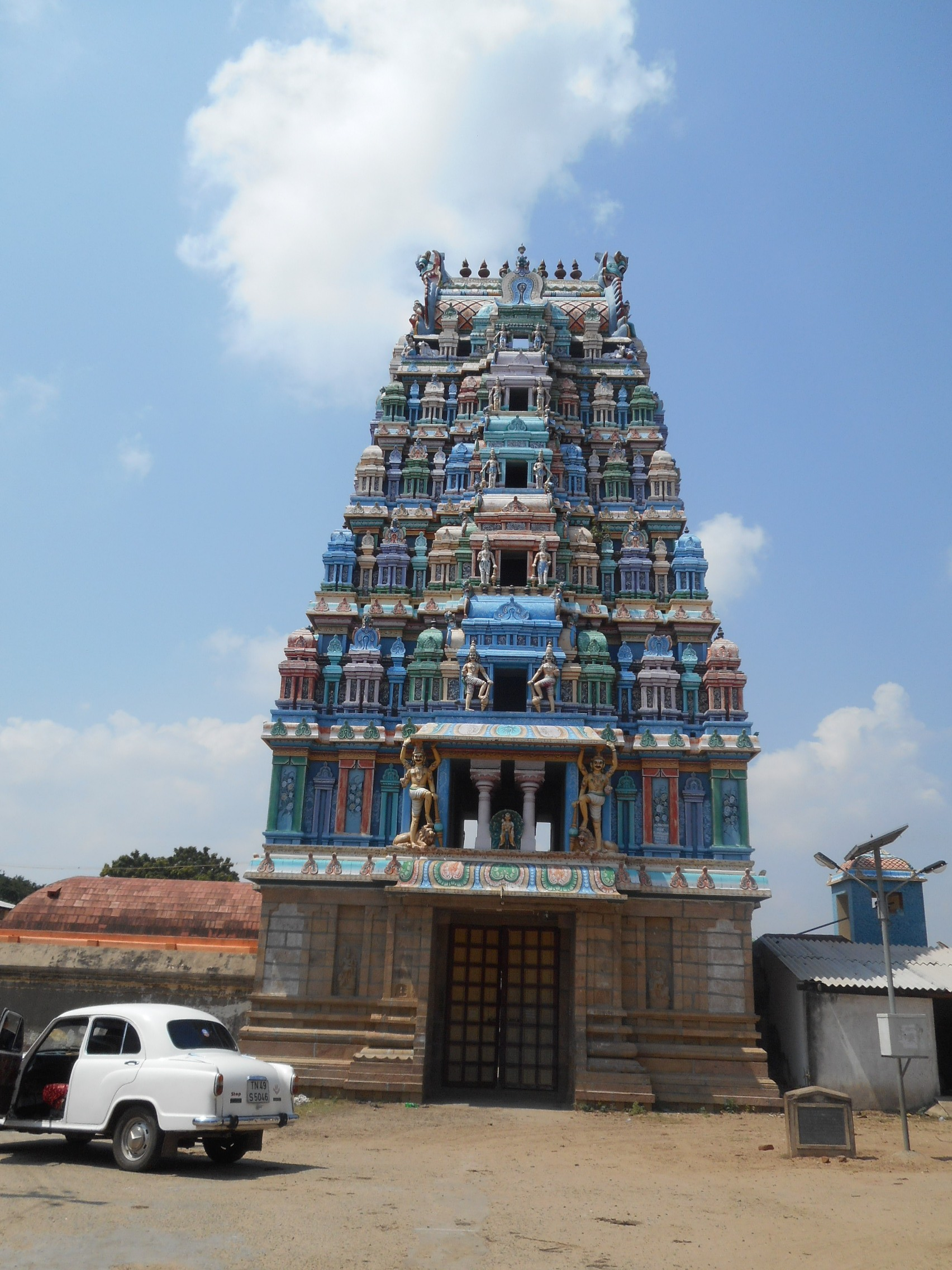
- Image of the Kodikkarai temple gopuram

- Location in Tamil Nadu

Religion
- Affiliation: Hinduism
- District: Nagapatnam
- Deity: Kuzhagar(Shiva)

Location
- Location: Kodikkarai
- State: Tamil Nadu
- Country: India
- Coordinates: 10°18′13″N 79°49′43″E

Architecture
- Type: Dravidian architecture

Kuzhagar Temple or Kodi Kuzhagar Temple (கோடிக் குழகர் கோயில்) (also called Amrithakadeswarar Temple) is a Hindu temple dedicated to Shiva, located in the town of Kodikkarai in Tamil Nadu, India. Kuzhagar is revered in the 7th century Tamil Saiva canonical work, the Tevaram, written by Tamil saint poets known as the nayanars and classified as Paadal Petra Sthalam.

Kuzhagar temple is originally believed to have been built by the Cholas and it has several inscriptions dating back to the Chola period. The temple is maintained and administered by the Hindu Religious and Endowment Board of the Government of Tamil Nadu.

== Etymology and legend ==
The town Kodikkarai is named after Kuzhagar, the presiding deity of the Kuzhagar Temple, a Hindu temple dedicated to Shiva. The 7th century Saiva canonical work Tevaram by Sundarar and Tirugnanasambandar mentions the place as Kuzhagar Kovil.

== History ==
The recorded history of Kodikkarai is found from the inscriptions in Kuzhagar Temple and Vedaranyeswarar Temple. The inscriptions date from the reign of Aditya Chola (871–907 CE), Rajaraja Chola I (985–1014 CE), Rajendra Chola I (1012–1044 CE) and Kulothunga Chola I (1070–1120 CE) indicating various grants to the temple. An inscription dating back to Parantaka Chola mentions the gift of 90 sheep by a merchant to the temple for the maintenance of a perpetual lamp.

The region of Kodikkarai along with Vedaranyam continued to be a part of the Chola Empire and the Chola region emerged as a centre of Saivism during the reign of Kulothunga Chola I (1070–1120 CE). After the fall of Cholas during the reign of Rajendra Chola II in the 13th century CE, the erstwhile Chola region was caught under a power struggle between Pandyas and Hoysalas. The royal patronage continued to the temple during the rule of the Nayaks. The Negapatam region (modern day Nagapattinam district) was briefly captured by French troops led by Lally (1702–66 CE) in 1759 CE. The Tanjore district was annexed by British after the French failed to subdue the king of Tanjore. In modern times, the temple is maintained and administered by the Hindu Religious and Endowment Board of the Government of Tamil Nadu.

== The temple ==
Kuzhagar temple complex has three prakarams (outer courtyard) and a five-tiered rajagopuram (gateway tower). The central shrine faces east and holds the image of Kuzhagar (Shiva) in the form of lingam made of granite. The granite images of the deities Ganesha (son of Shiva and god of wisdom), Murugan (son of Shiva and god of war), Nandi (the bull and vehicle of Shiva) and Navagraha (nine planetary deities) are located in the hall leading to the sanctum. As in other Shiva temples of Tamil Nadu, the first precinct or the walls around the sanctum of Kuzhagar has images of Dakshinamurthy (Shiva as the Teacher), Durga (warrior-goddess) and Chandikeswarar (a saint and devotee of Shiva). The second precinct is surrounded by granite walls.

== Gallery ==
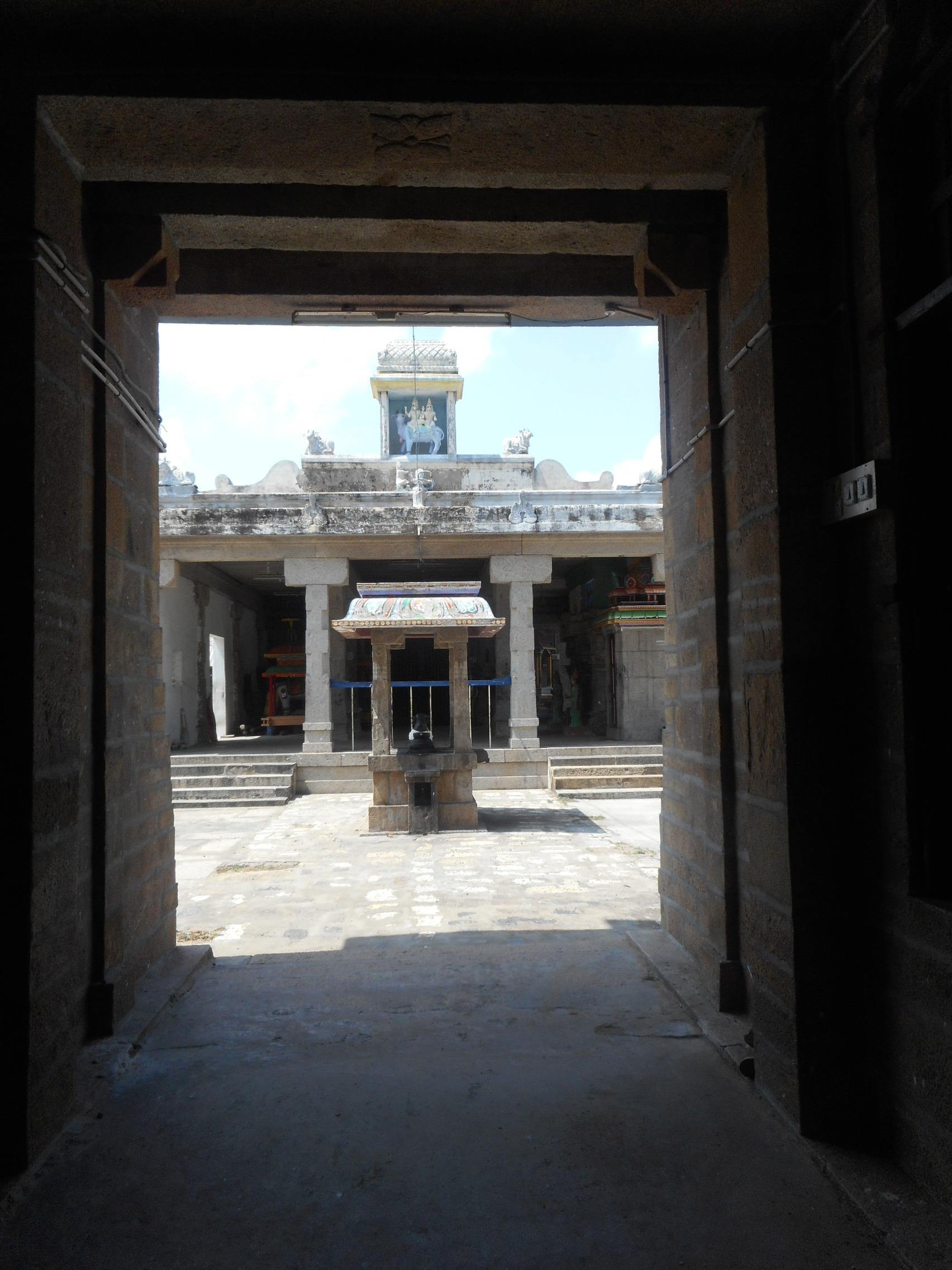
View from entrance

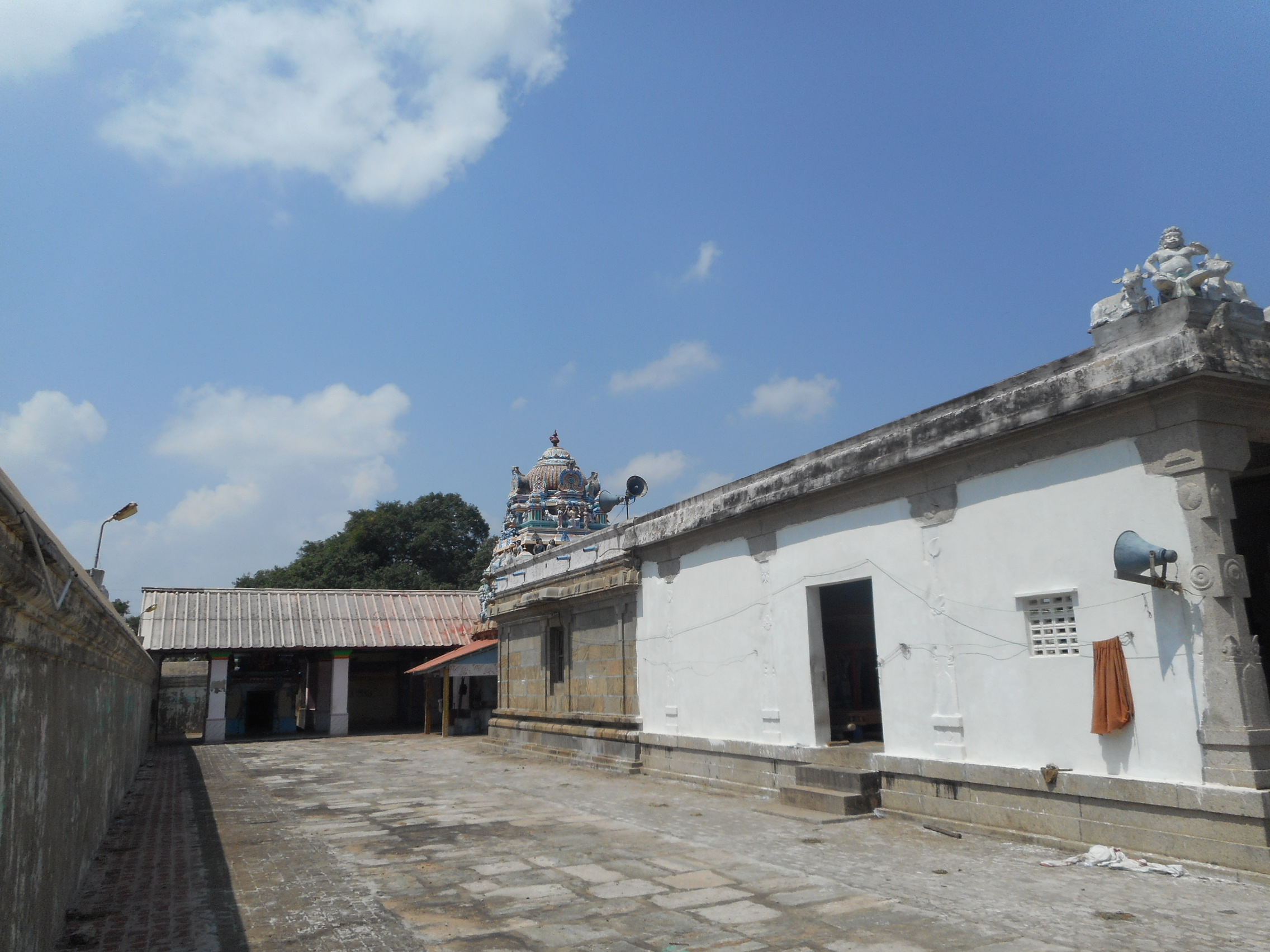
The precinct inside the temple

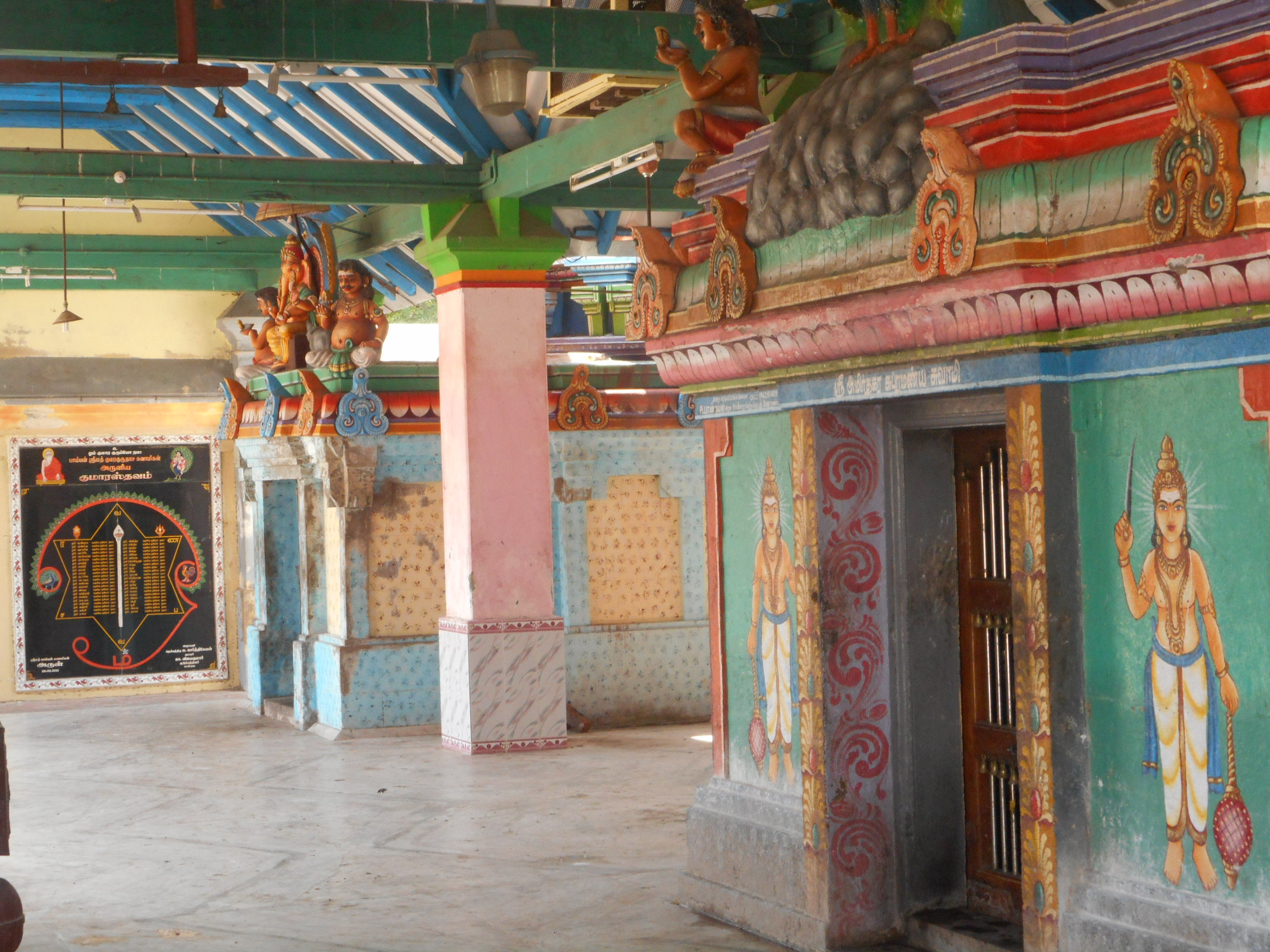
Shrines in the precinct

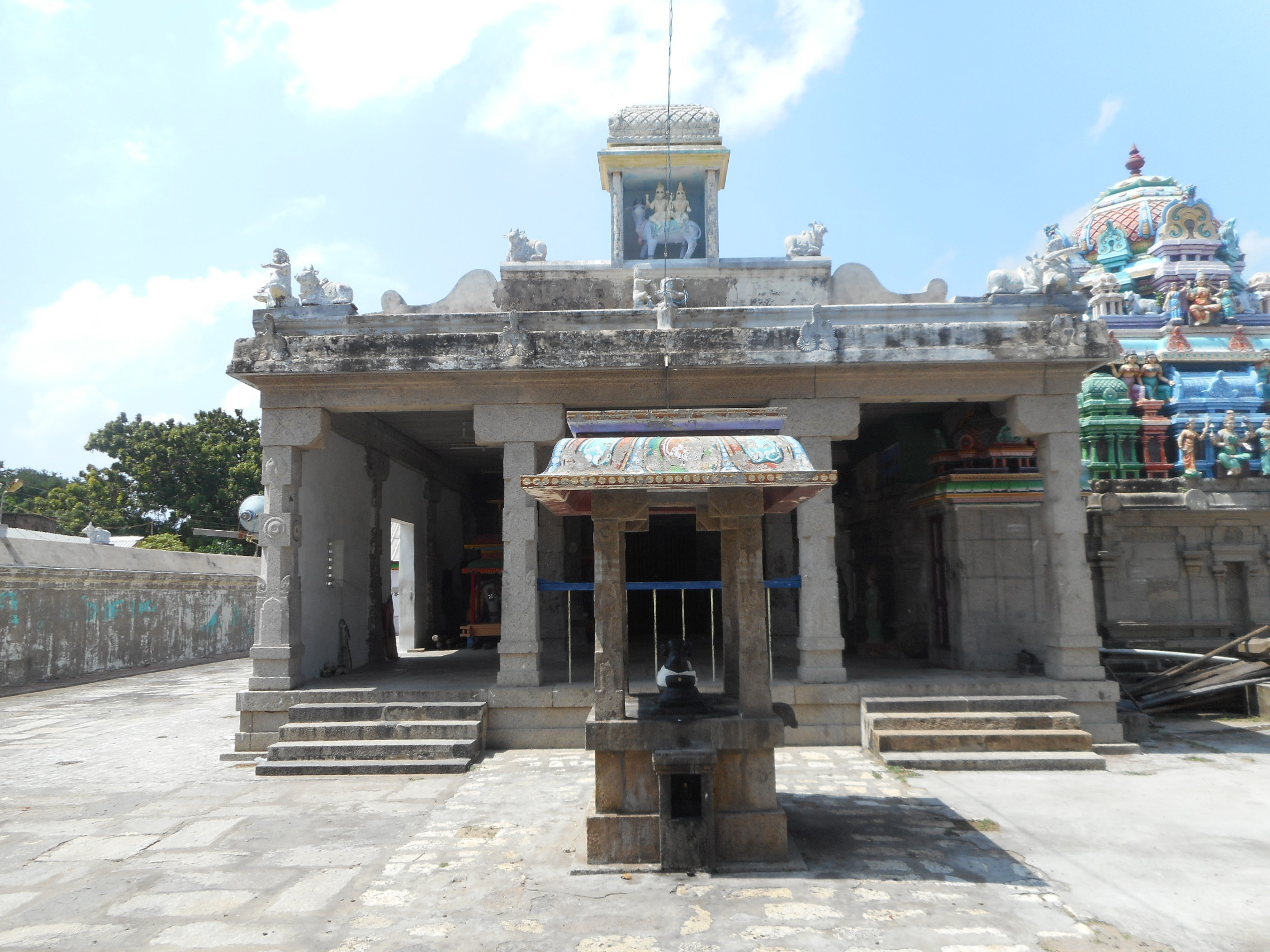
Shrine inside the temple
