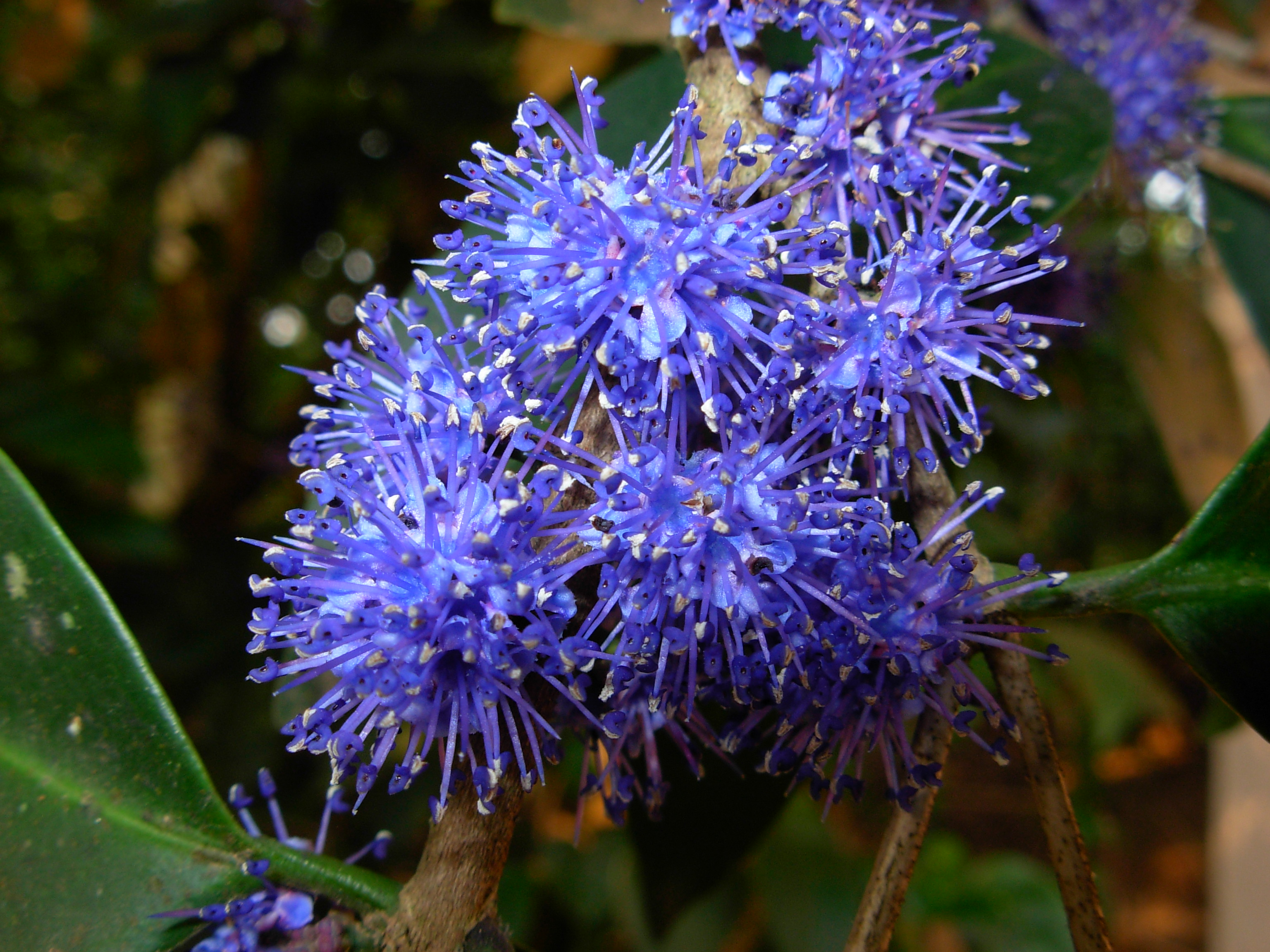

Scientific classification
- Kingdom: Plantae
- Clade: Tracheophytes
- Clade: Angiosperms
- Clade: Eudicots
- Clade: Rosids
- Order: Myrtales
- Family: Melastomataceae
- Genus: Memecylon
- Species: M. umbellatum

Binomial name
- Memecylon umbellatum Burm.f.

= Memecylon umbellatum =

Species of tree

Memecylon umbellatum, commonly known as ironwood, anjani (Marathi) or alli (Telugu), is a small tree found in India, the Andaman islands and the coastal region of the Deccan. It is also found in Sri Lanka, where it is called blue mist, kora-kaha (Sinhala language) and kurrikaya (Tamil language). The leaves contain a yellow dye, a glucoside, which is used for dyeing the robes of Buddhist monks and for colouring reed mats (Dumbara mats). Medicinally, the leaves are said to have anti-diarrhoeal properties. Historically, this plant was burnt as fuel in the production of Wootz steel.

== Names ==
- Botanical Name : Memecylon umbellatum
- English : Ironwood
- Sinhala : කොරකහ (Korakaha)
- Sanskrit : अंजन (Anjan)
- Hindi : अंजन (Anjan)
- Bengali : অঞ্জন (Anjan)
- Marathi : अंजनी (Anjani)
- Konkani : काळ्यो आंक्र्यो (Kalleo ankrio)
- Kannada : ಒಳ್ಳಯ ಕುಡಿ (Ollayakudi)
- Telugu : అల్లి (Alli)
- Tamil : காயா (Kaya)
- Malayalam : കാഞ്ഞാവ് (Kaannaav), കായാമ്പൂ (Kaayaamboo), കാശാവ്‌ (Kashavu)

== Description ==
It is a large shrub or small tree. Its bark and branches are very hard. That is why it is called Ironwood (or possibly because of its important historical role in the production of Wootz steel). Leaves are simple, opposite type. Leaves contain glucose. Flowers are blue coloured and produced in cymose umbels. The fruit is round berry bluish-black in colour. Flowering time is February to March.
