= List of birds of Tamil Nadu =

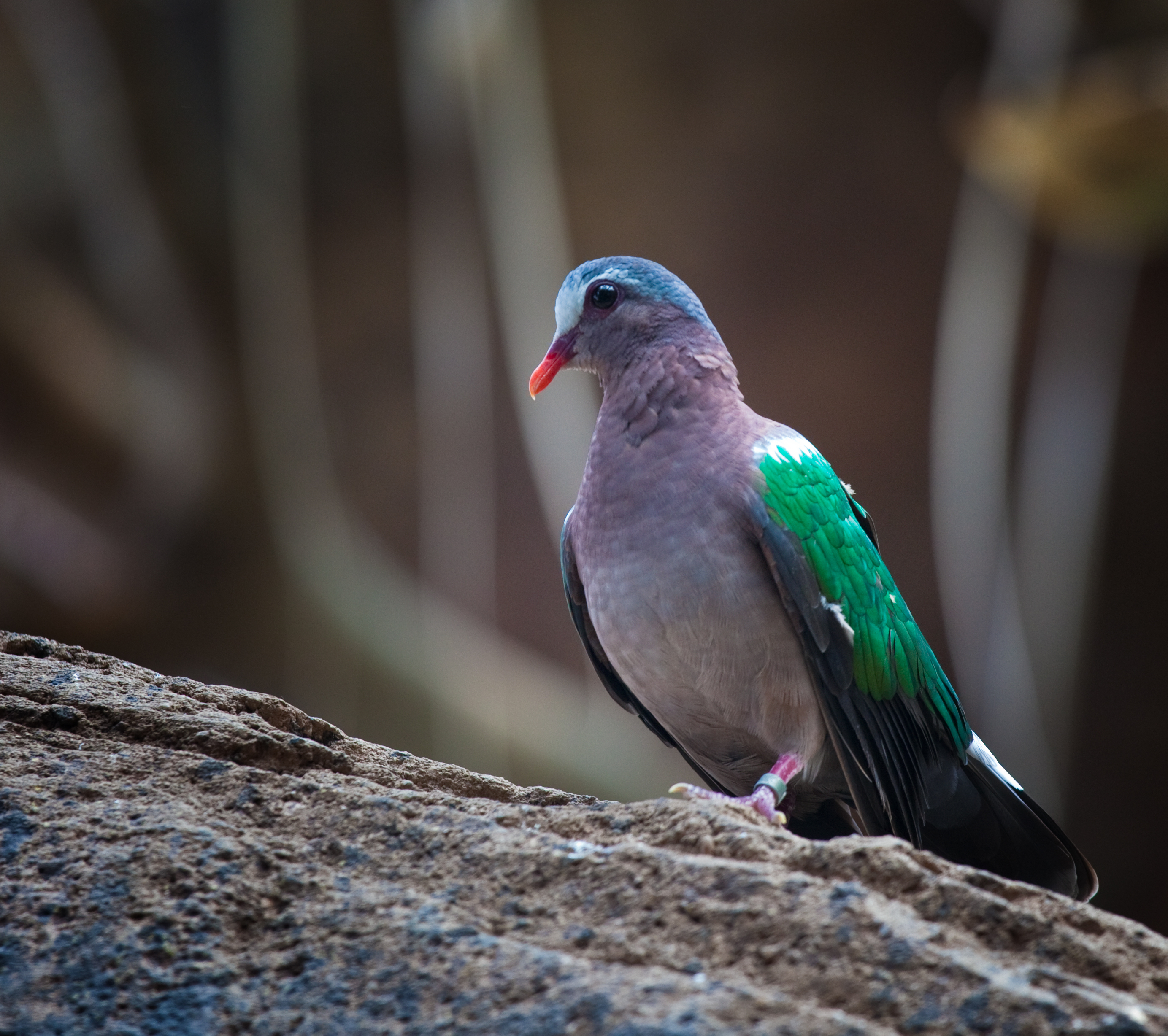
Common emerald dove, the state bird of Tamil Nadu

This article lists the birds found in the Indian state of Tamil Nadu. 583 species of birds have been spotted in Tamil Nadu. The list also sometimes includes the local Tamil name in italics or the Tamil name in Tamil script following the English common name. This list's taxonomic treatment (designation and sequence of orders, families and species) and nomenclature (common and scientific names) follow the conventions of the IOC World Bird List, version 11.2. This list also uses British English throughout. Any bird names or other wording follows that convention.

The following tags have been used to highlight several categories. The commonly occurring native species do not fit within any of these categories.

- (A) Accidental - also known as a rarity, it refers to a species that rarely or accidentally occurs in Tamil Nadu - typically less than ten confirmed records
- (I) Introduced - a species introduced to Tamil Nadu as a consequence, direct or indirect, of human actions

== Ducks, geese, and swans ==
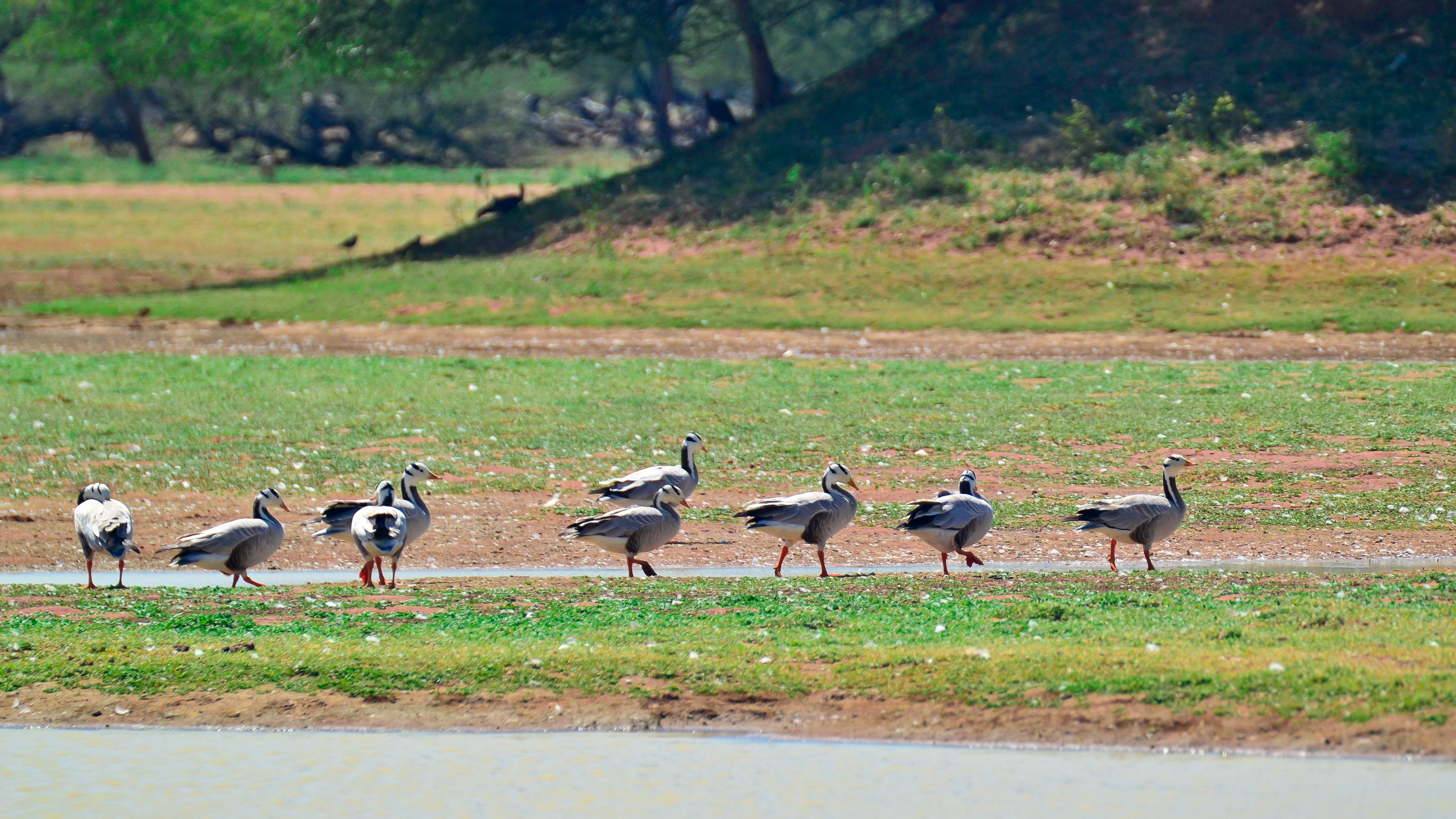
Bar-headed geese

Order: Anseriformes Family: Anatidae

Anatidae includes the ducks and most duck-like waterfowl, such as geese and swans. These birds are adapted to an aquatic existence with webbed feet, flattened bills, and feathers that are excellent at shedding water due to an oily coating.

- Fulvous whistling duck, பெரிய சீழ்கை சிறகி (A)
- Lesser whistling duck, சிறிய சீழ்கை சிறகி
- Bar-headed goose, பட்டைத்தலை வாத்து
- Greylag goose
- Knob-billed duck, செண்டு வாத்து
- Ruddy shelduck, கருடதாரா (A)
- Cotton pygmy goose, அல்லிச் சிறகி
- Garganey, வெண்புருவ வாத்து (அ) நீலச்சிறகி
- Northern shoveler, ஆண்டி வாத்து
- Gadwall, கருவால் வாத்து (A)
- Falcated duck
- Eurasian wigeon, நாமத்தலை வாத்து
- Indian spot-billed duck, புள்ளி-மூக்கு வாத்து
- Northern pintail, ஊசிவால் வாத்து
- Eurasian teal, கிளுவை
- Pink-headed duck, இளஞ்சிவப்பு தலை வாத்து
- Red-crested pochard
- Common pochard
- Ferruginous duck, வெள்ளைக்கண் களியன்
- Tufted duck, குறுங்களியன்

== Pheasants and allies ==
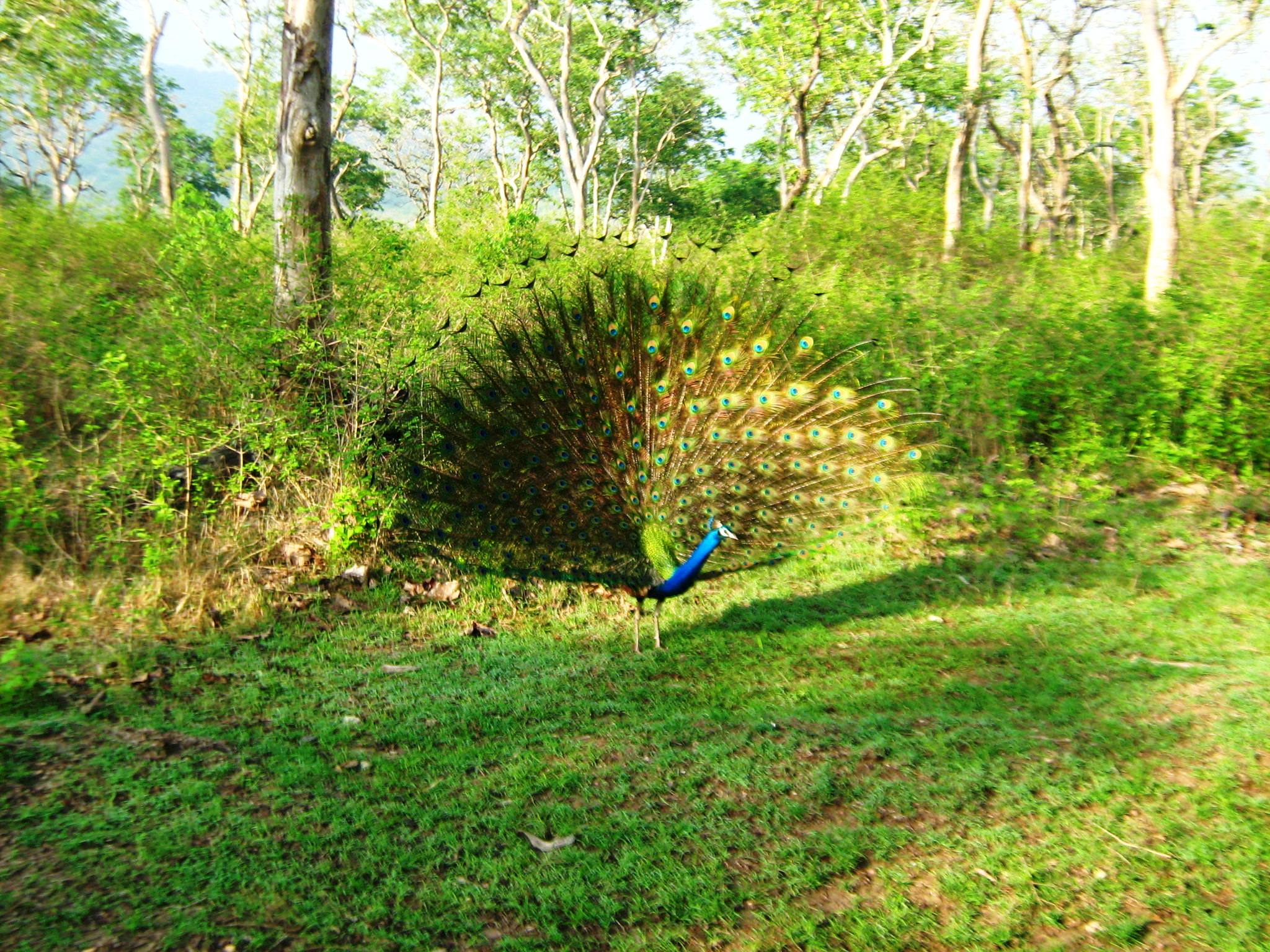
Indian peafowl

Order: Galliformes Family: Phasianidae

The Phasianidae are a family of terrestrial birds. In general, they are plump (although they vary in size) and have broad, relatively short wings.

- Painted francolin, வர்ண கௌதாரி
- Grey francolin, கௌதாரி
- Common quail, காடை
- Rain quail, கருங்காடை
- King quail
- Jungle bush quail, புதர் காடை
- Rock bush quail, மலைக்காடை
- Painted bush quail, வர்ண காடை
- Red spurfowl, சுண்டங் கோழி
- Painted spurfowl, வர்ண சுண்டங் கோழி
- Grey junglefowl, காட்டு கோழி
- Indian peafowl, நீல மயில்

== Frogmouths ==
Order: Caprimulgiformes Family: Podargidae

The frogmouths are a group of nocturnal birds related to the nightjars. They are named for their large flattened hooked bill and huge frog-like gape, which they use to take insects.

- Sri Lanka frogmouth

== Nightjars ==
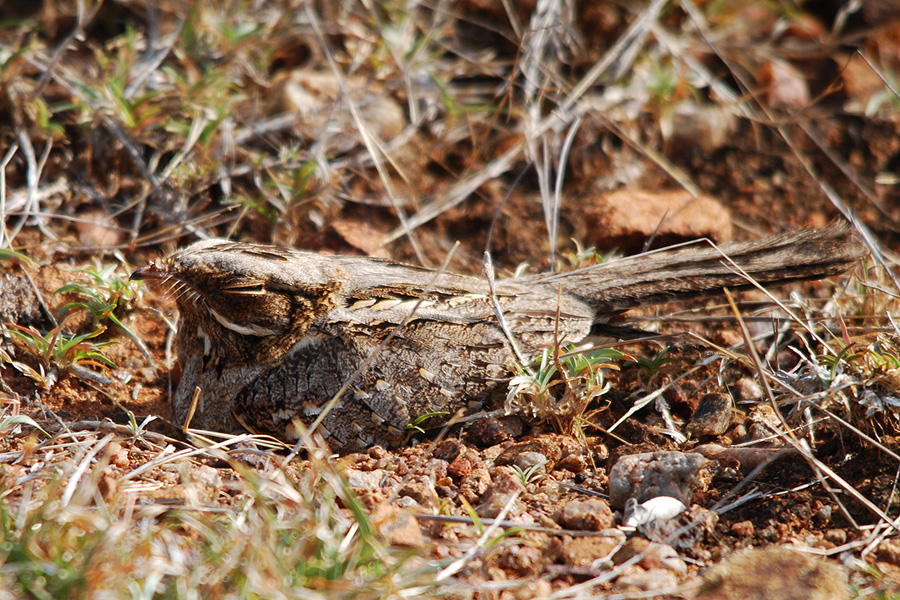
Indian nightjar

Order: Caprimulgiformes Family: Caprimulgidae

Nightjars are medium-sized nocturnal birds that usually nest on the ground. They have long wings, short legs and very short bills. Most have small feet, of little use for walking, and long pointed wings. Their soft plumage is camouflaged to resemble bark or leaves.

- Great eared nightjar
- Jungle nightjar, காட்டுப் பக்கி
- Jerdon's nightjar, நீண்டவால் பக்கி
- Indian nightjar, சின்ன பக்கி
- Savanna nightjar

== Treeswifts ==
Order: Apodiformes Family: Hemiprocnidae

The treeswifts, or crested swifts, are closely related to the true swifts. They differ from the other swifts in that they have crests, long forked tails and softer plumage.

- Crested treeswift, kondai uzhavaran

== Swifts ==
Order: Apodiformes Family: Apodidae

Swifts are small birds which spend the majority of their lives flying. These birds have very short legs and never settle voluntarily on the ground, perching instead only on vertical surfaces. Many swifts have long swept-back wings which resemble a crescent or boomerang.

- Indian swiftlet
- White-rumped spinetail
- White-throated needletail
- Brown-backed needletail
- Asian palm swift, panai uzhavaran
- Alpine swift, malai uzhavaran
- Common swift
- Blyth's swift
- Little swift
- House swift, nattu uzhavaran

== Bustards ==
Order: Otidiformes Family: Otididae

Bustards are large terrestrial birds mainly associated with dry open country and steppes in the Old World. They are omnivorous and nest on the ground. They walk steadily on strong legs and big toes, pecking for food as they go. They have long broad wings with "fingered" wingtips and striking patterns in flight. Many have interesting mating displays.

- Great Indian bustard
- Lesser florican, varagu kozhi

== Cuckoos ==
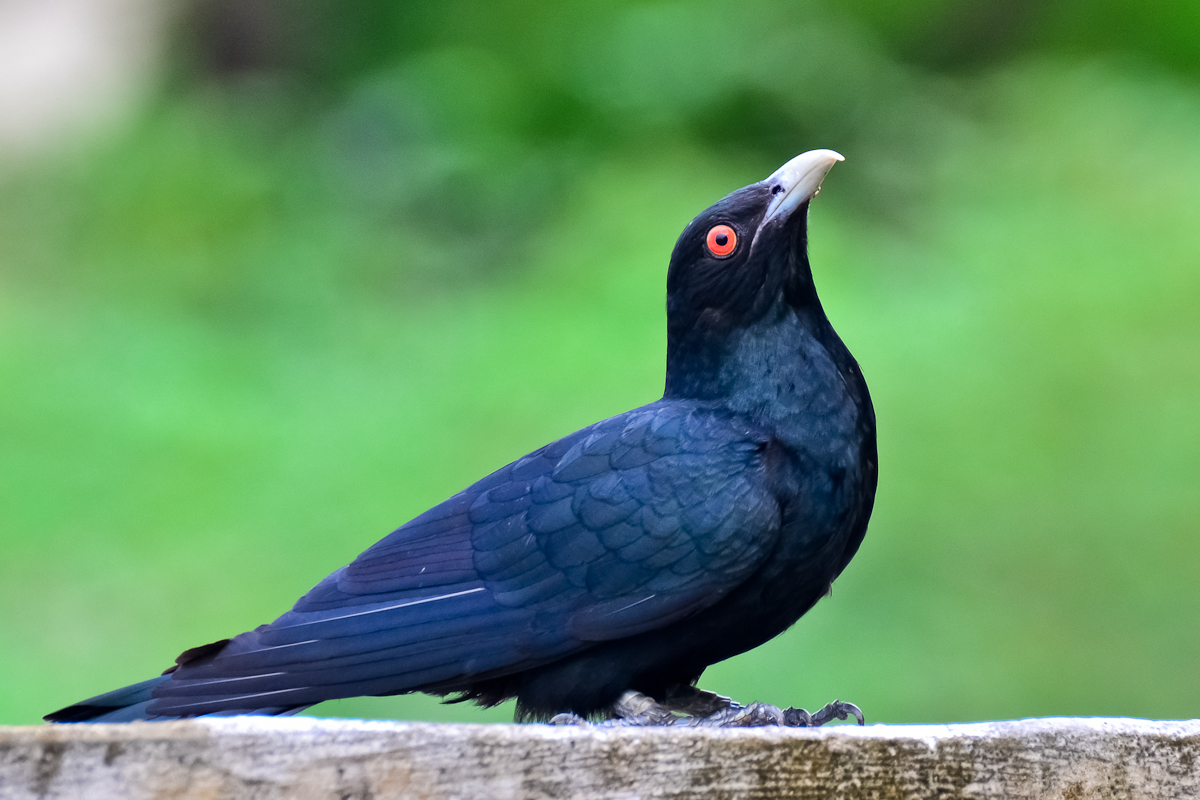
Asian koel

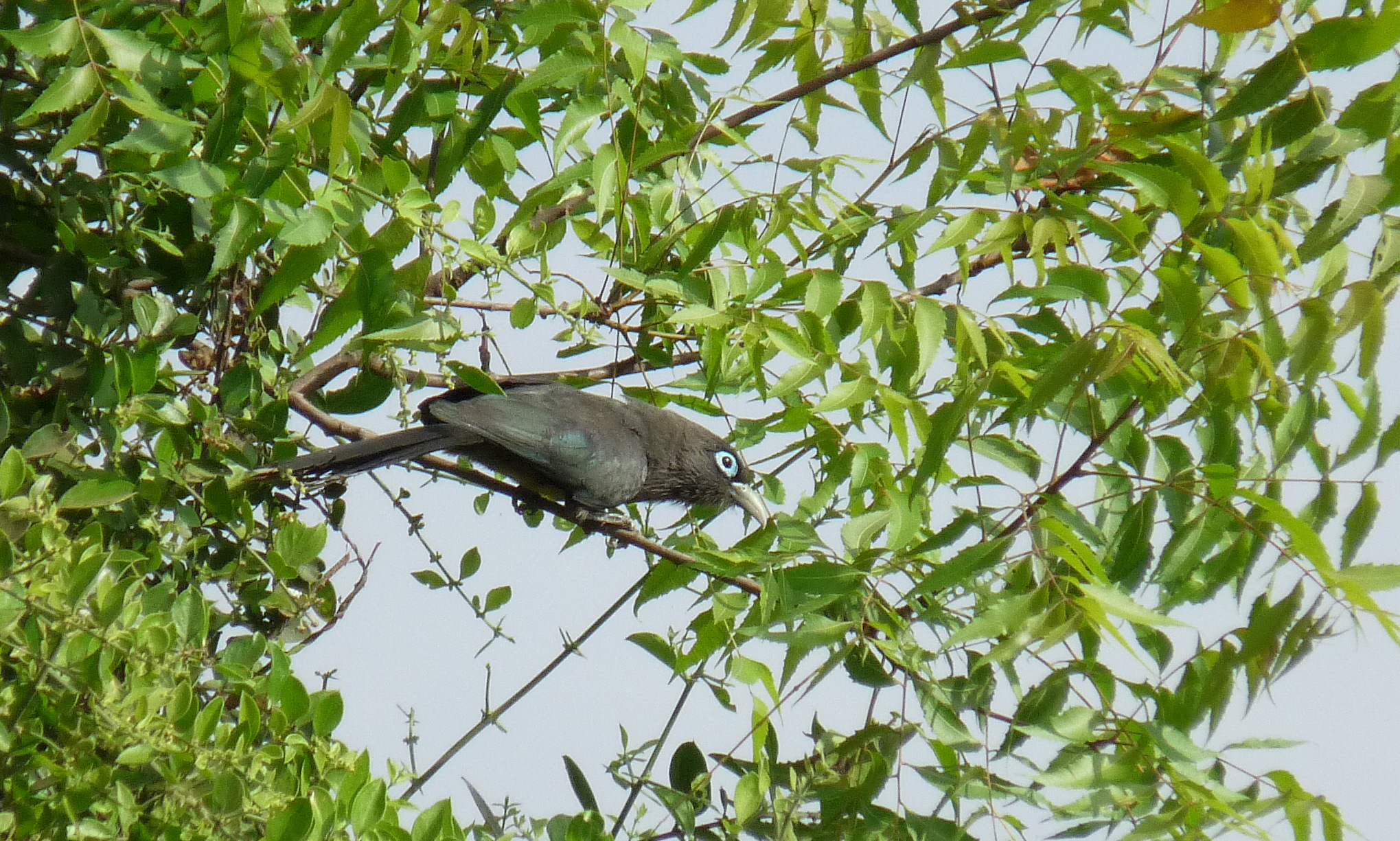
Blue-faced malkoha

Order: Cuculiformes Family: Cuculidae

The family Cuculidae includes cuckoos, roadrunners and anis. These birds are of variable size with slender bodies, long tails and strong legs. Many are brood parasites.

- Greater coucal, shenbagam
- Lesser coucal
- Sirkeer malkoha, chevvaayan
- Blue-faced malkoha, pachai vayan
- Chestnut-winged cuckoo
- Jacobin cuckoo, sudalai kuyil
- Asian koel, kokilam
- Asian emerald cuckoo
- Banded bay cuckoo, senkkuyil
- Plaintive cuckoo, kuyil
- Grey-bellied cuckoo
- Square-tailed drongo-cuckoo
- Fork-tailed drongo-cuckoo
- Large hawk-cuckoo
- Common hawk-cuckoo, akka kuyil
- Hodgson's hawk-cuckoo
- Lesser cuckoo
- Indian cuckoo, kuyil
- Common cuckoo

== Sandgrouse ==
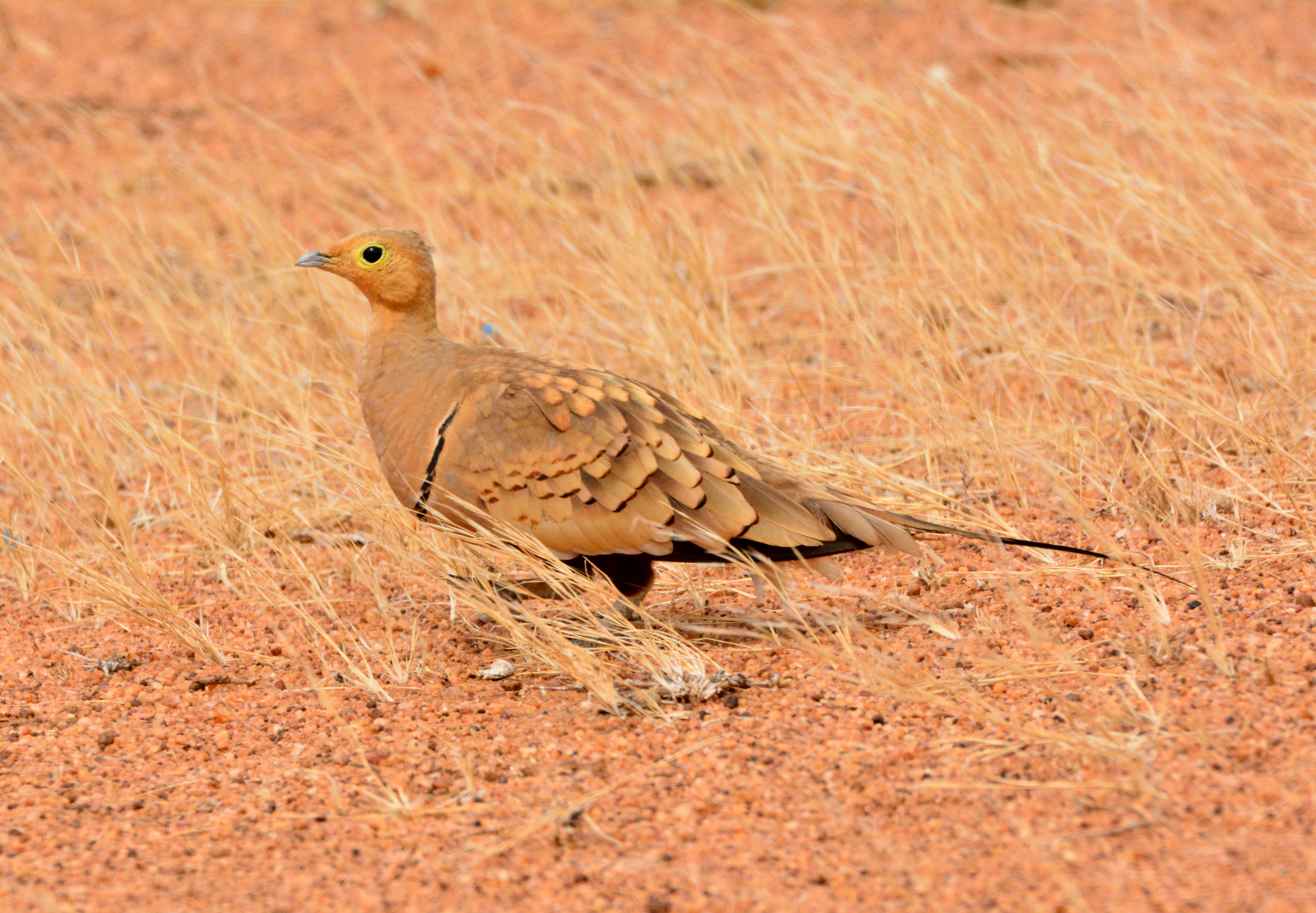
Chestnut-bellied sandgrouse

Order: Pterocliformes Family: Pteroclidae

Sandgrouse have small, pigeon like heads and necks, but sturdy compact bodies. They have long pointed wings and sometimes tails and a fast direct flight. Flocks fly to watering holes at dawn and dusk. Their legs are feathered down to the toes.

- Chestnut-bellied sandgrouse, kal kowdhari
- Painted sandgrouse, varna kowdhari

== Pigeons and doves ==
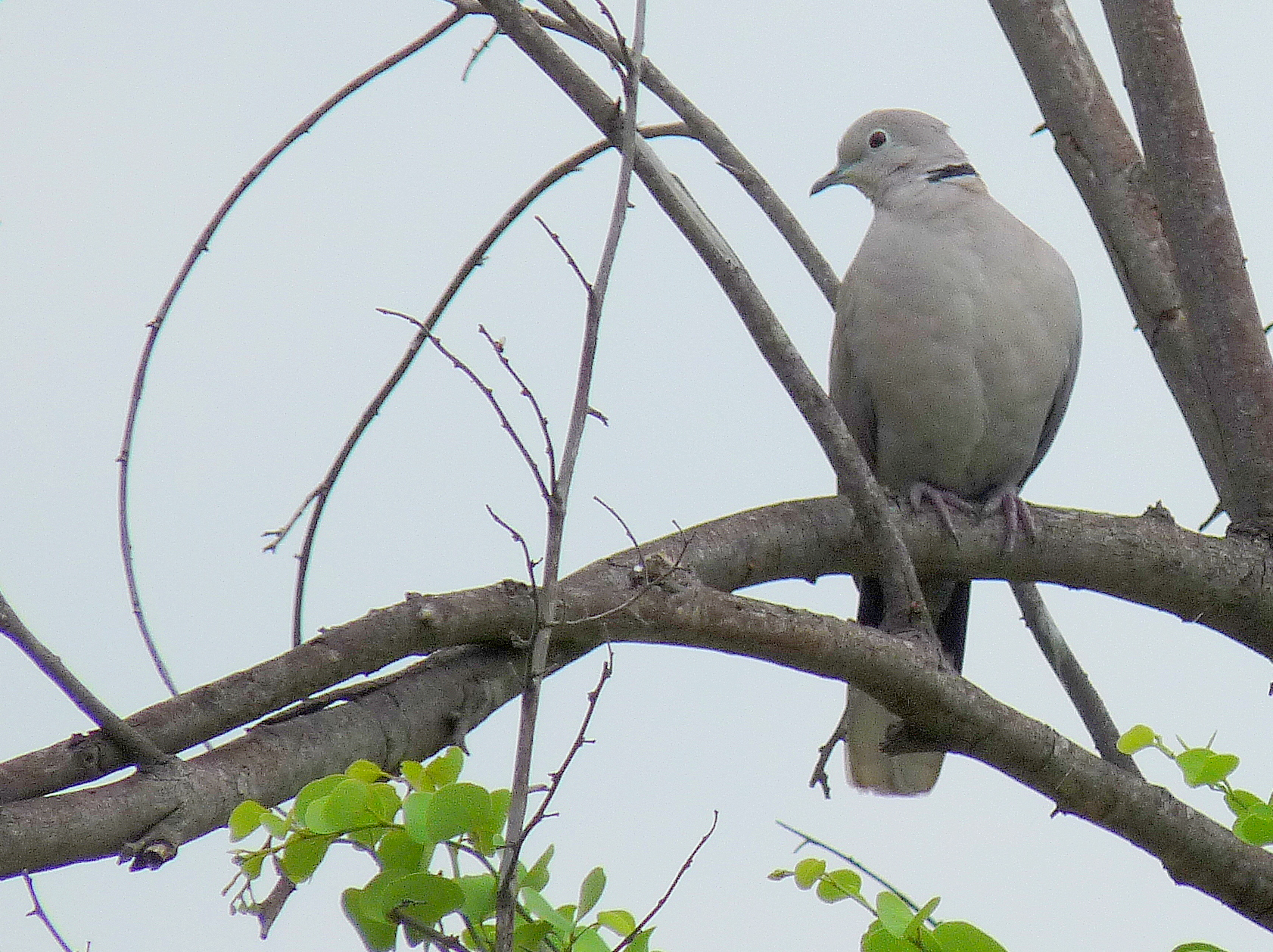
Eurasian collared dove

Order: Columbiformes Family: Columbidae

Pigeons and doves are stout-bodied birds with short necks and short slender bills with a fleshy cere.

- Rock dove
- Nilgiri wood pigeon, nilagiri kattu pura
- Oriental turtle dove
- Eurasian collared dove, kalli pura
- Red collared dove, thavittu pura
- Spotted dove, pulli pura
- Laughing dove
- Common emerald dove, pancha varna pura
- Orange-breasted green pigeon
- Grey-fronted green pigeon, சாம்பல் நேற்றிப் புறா
- Yellow-footed green pigeon, pachai pura
- Green imperial pigeon, peria pachai pura
- Mountain imperial pigeon, mandhi pura

== Rails, crakes, and coots ==
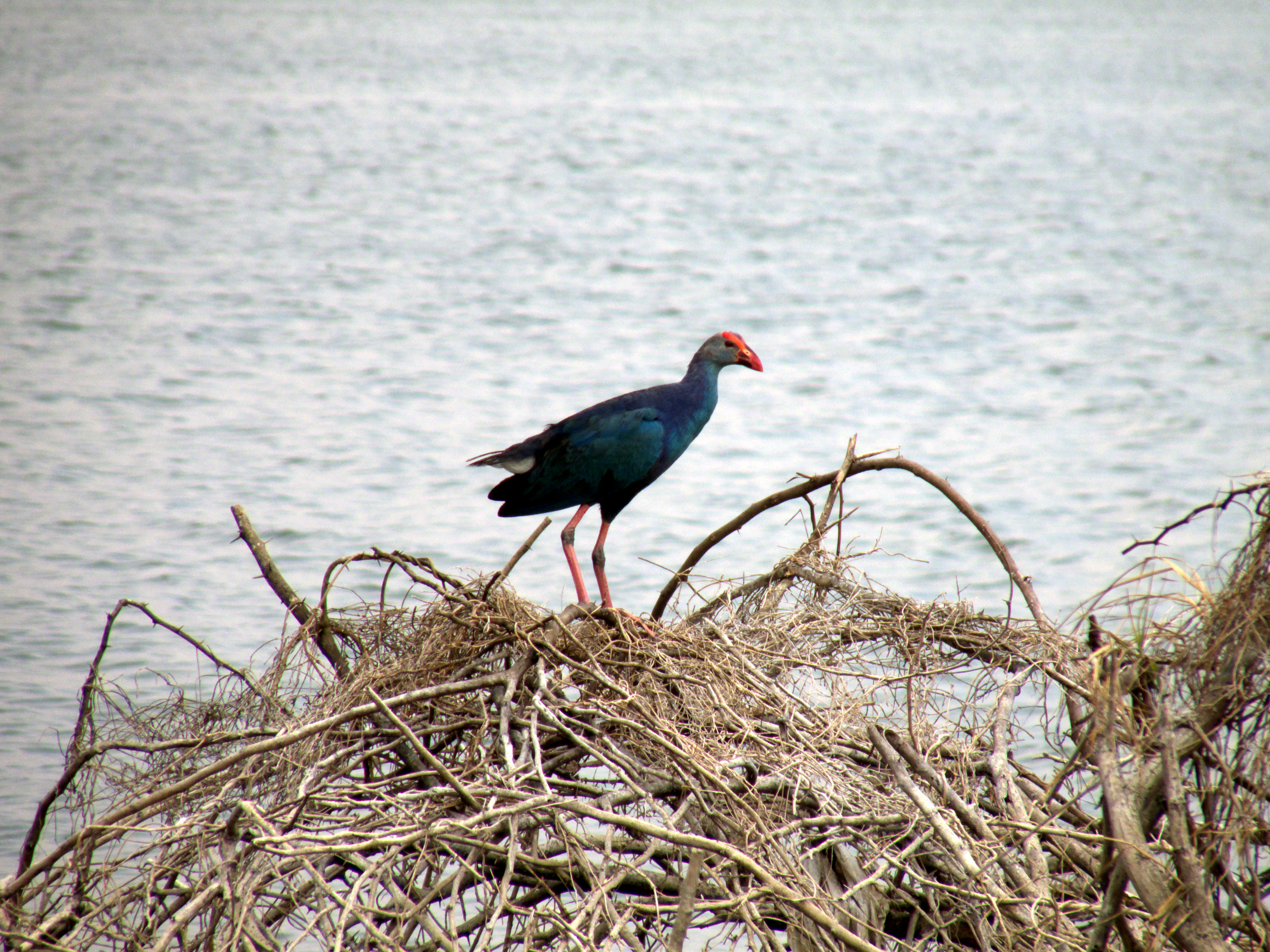
Grey-headed swamphen

Order: Gruiformes Family: Rallidae

Rallidae is a large family of small to medium-sized birds which includes the rails, crakes, coots and gallinules. Typically they inhabit dense vegetation in damp environments near lakes, swamps or rivers. In general they are shy and secretive birds, making them difficult to observe. Most species have strong legs and long toes which are well adapted to soft uneven surfaces. They tend to have short, rounded wings and to be weak fliers.

- Slaty-breasted rail, neela maarbu sambang kozhi
- Common moorhen, thaazhai kozhi
- Eurasian coot, naamak kozhi
- Grey-headed swamphen, neela thazhai kozhi
- Ruddy-breasted crake, sivappu kaanaan kozhi
- Brown crake
- Baillon's crake
- Little crake, chinna kaanaan kozhi
- Slaty-legged crake, kaanan kozhi
- Watercock, thanneer kozhi
- White-breasted waterhen, kambul kozhi

== Grebes ==
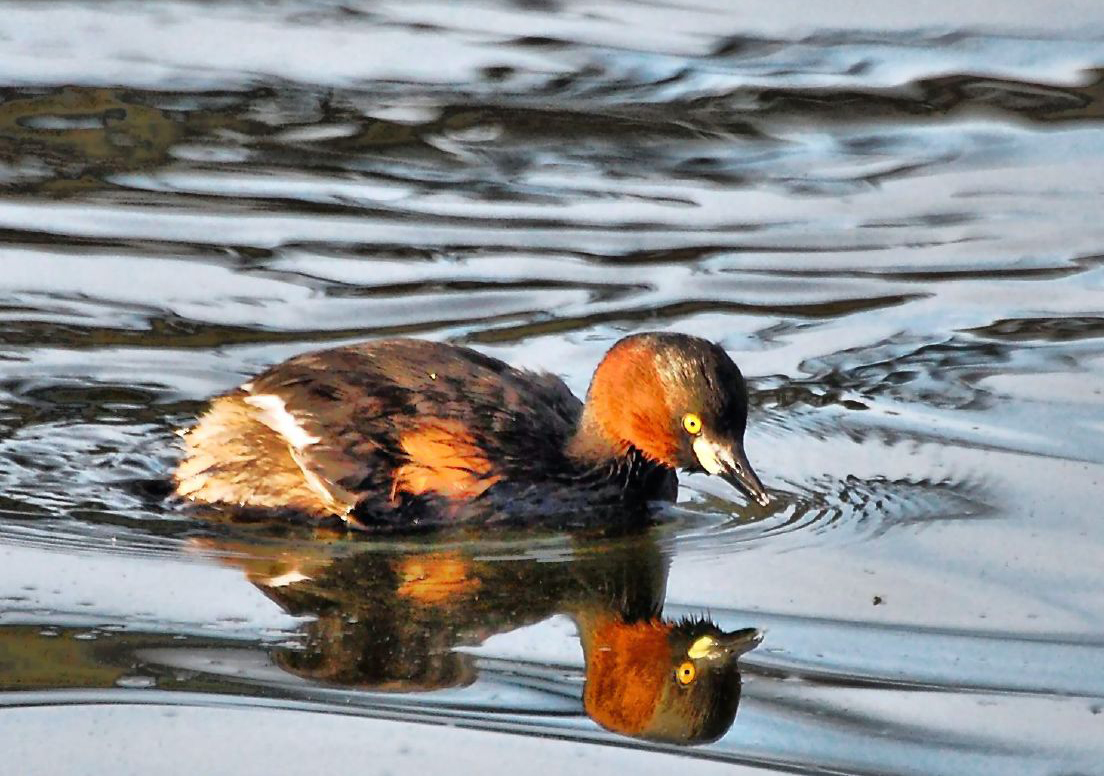
Little grebe

Order: Podicipediformes Family: Podicipedidae

Grebes are small to medium-large freshwater diving birds. They have lobed toes and are excellent swimmers and divers. However, they have their feet placed far back on the body, making them quite ungainly on land.

- Little grebe, முக்குளிப்பான்
- Great crested grebe, பெருங்கொண்டை முக்குளிப்பான்
- Black-necked grebe, கருந்தொண்டை முக்குளிப்பான்

== Flamingos ==
Order: Phoenicopteriformes Family: Phoenicopteridae

Flamingos are gregarious wading birds, usually 1 to 1.5 metres (3 to 5 ft) tall, found in both the Western and Eastern Hemispheres. Flamingos filter-feed on shellfish and algae. Their oddly shaped beaks are specially adapted to separate mud and silt from the food they consume and, uniquely, are used upside-down.

- Greater flamingo, பெரிய பூநாரை
- Lesser flamingo, சிறிய பூநாரை (A)

== Buttonquail ==
Order: Charadriiformes Family: Turnicidae

The buttonquail are small, drab, running birds which resemble the true quails. The female is the brighter of the sexes and initiates courtship. The male incubates the eggs and tends the young.

- Common buttonquail, kurung kaadai
- Yellow-legged buttonquail, manjalkaal kaadai
- Barred buttonquail

== Stone-curlews and thick-knees ==
Order: Charadriiformes Family: Burhinidae

The thick-knees are a group of largely tropical waders in the family Burhinidae. They are found worldwide within the tropical zone, with some species also breeding in temperate Europe and Australia. They are medium to large waders with strong black or yellow-black bills, large yellow eyes and cryptic plumage. Despite being classed as waders, most species have a preference for arid or semi-arid habitats.

- Indian stone-curlew, kankiledi
- Great stone-curlew

== Oystercatchers ==
Order: Charadriiformes Family: Haematopodidae

The oystercatchers are large and noisy plover-like birds, with strong bills used for smashing or prising open molluscs.

- Eurasian oystercatcher

== Stilts and avocets ==
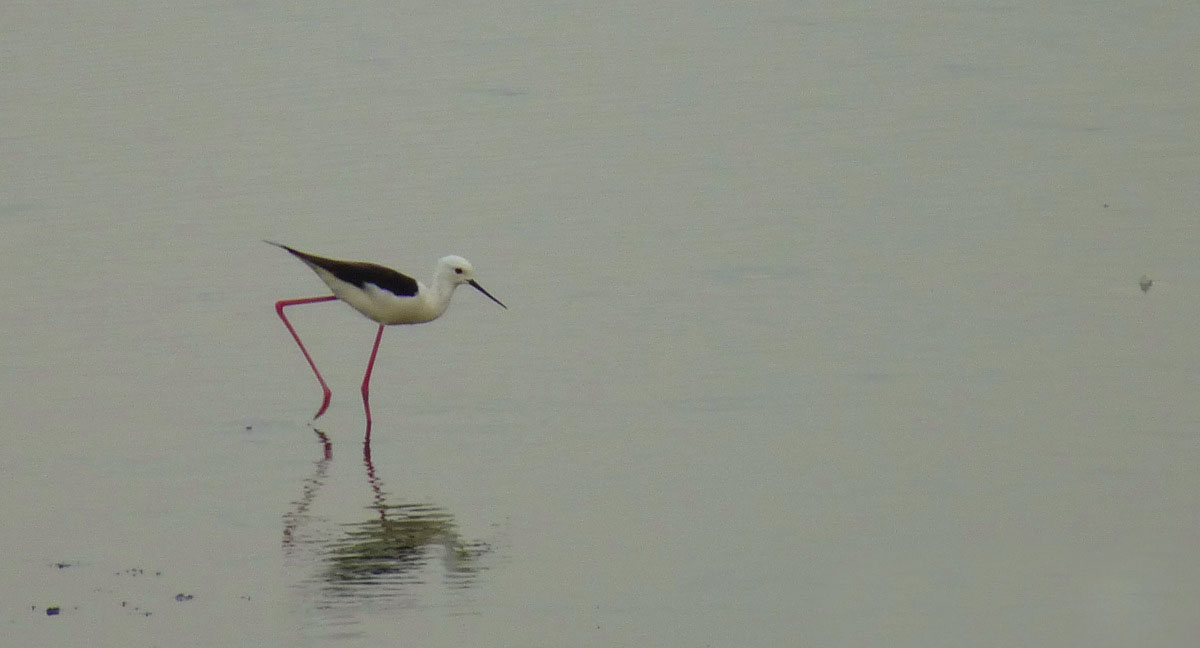
Black-winged stilt

Order: Charadriiformes Family: Recurvirostridae

Recurvirostridae is a family of large wading birds, which includes the avocets and stilts. The avocets have long legs and long up-curved bills. The stilts have extremely long legs and long, thin, straight bills.

- Black-winged stilt, nedungaal ullan
- Pied avocet, konamookku ullan

== Plovers ==
Order: Charadriiformes Family: Charadriidae

The family Charadriidae includes the plovers, dotterels and lapwings. They are small to medium-sized birds with compact bodies, short, thick necks and long, usually pointed, wings. They are found in open country worldwide, mostly in habitats near water.

- Yellow-wattled lapwing, manjal mookku aalkatti
- Grey-headed lapwing
- Red-wattled lapwing, sivappu mookku aalkatti
- Pacific golden plover, kalporukki uppukkothi
- Grey plover, sambal uppukkothi
- Common ringed plover
- Little ringed plover, pattani uppukkothi
- Kentish plover, siriya uppukkothi
- Lesser sand plover, manal nira uppukkothi
- Greater sand plover
- Caspian plover

== Painted-snipes ==
Order: Charadriiformes Family: Rostratulidae

Painted-snipes are short-legged, long-billed birds similar in shape to the true snipes, but more brightly coloured.

- Greater painted-snipe, mayil ullan

== Jacanas ==
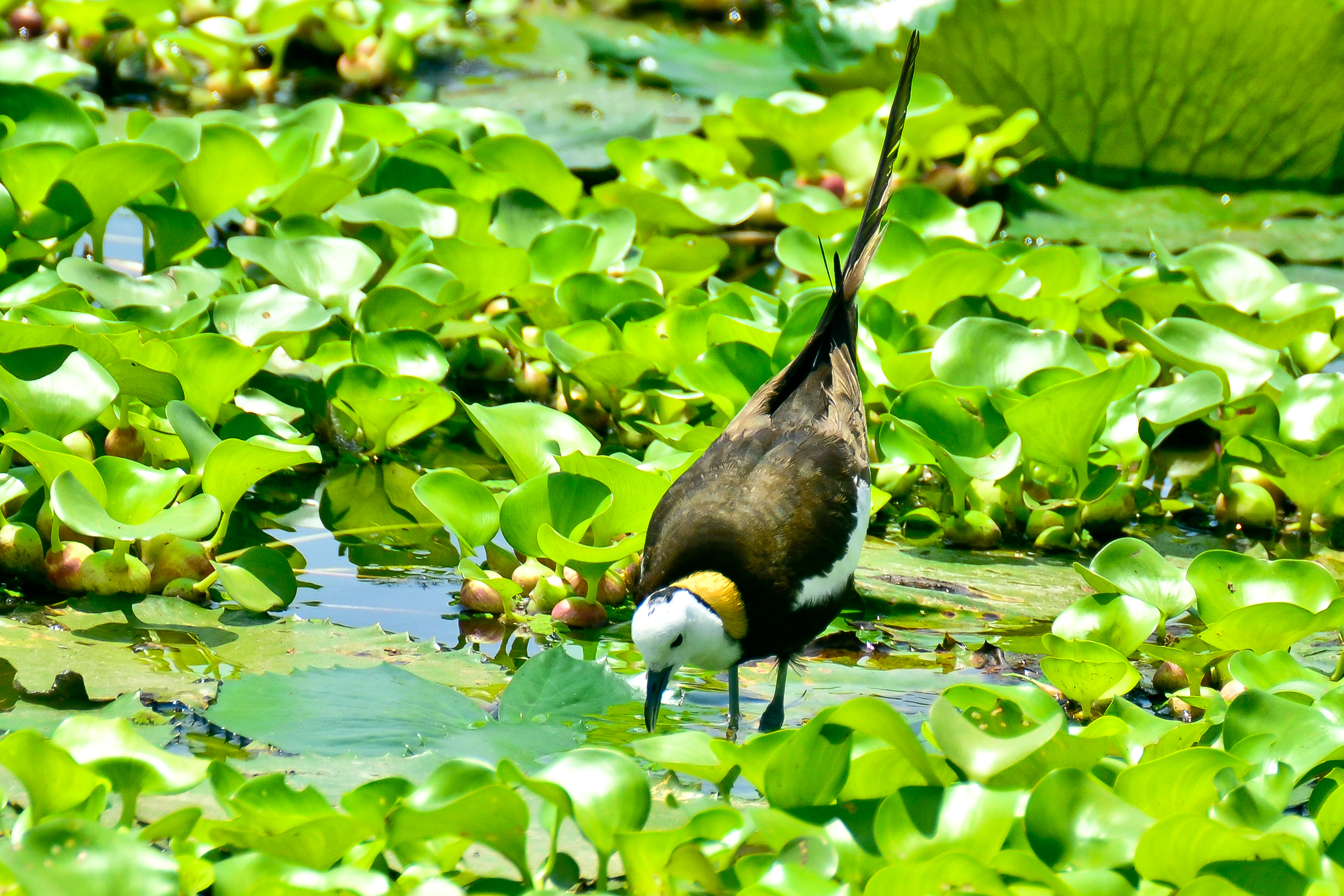
Pheasant-tailed jacana

Order: Charadriiformes Family: Jacanidae

The jacanas are a group of tropical waders in the family Jacanidae. They are found throughout the tropics. They are identifiable by their huge feet and claws which enable them to walk on floating vegetation in the shallow lakes that are their preferred habitat.

- Pheasant-tailed jacana, neela vaal ilai kozhi
- Bronze-winged jacana, thamarai ilai kozhi

== Sandpipers and snipes ==
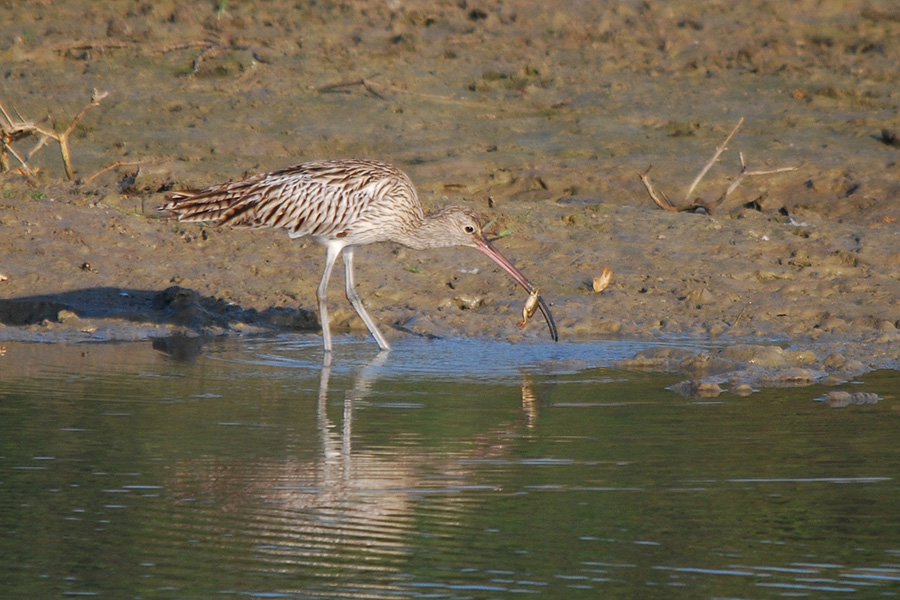
Eurasian curlew

Order: Charadriiformes Family: Scolopacidae

Scolopacidae is a large diverse family of small to medium-sized shorebirds including the sandpipers, curlews, godwits, shanks, tattlers, woodcocks, snipes, dowitchers and phalaropes. The majority of these species eat small invertebrates picked out of the mud or soil. Variation in length of legs and bills enables multiple species to feed in the same habitat, particularly on the coast, without direct competition for food.

- Eurasian whimbrel, ciru kottan
- Eurasian curlew, peria kottan
- Bar-tailed godwit, pattaivaal mookkaan
- Black-tailed godwit, karuvaal mookkaan
- Ruddy turnstone, kalthiruppi ullan
- Great knot
- Red knot (A)
- Ruff, pedhai ullan
- Broad-billed sandpiper, agandra alagu ullan
- Curlew sandpiper, curlew ullan
- Temminck's stint, pachai kaal kosu ullan
- Long-toed stint
- Spoon-billed sandpiper (A)
- Red-necked stint
- Sanderling
- Dunlin
- Little stint, kosu ullan
- Asian dowitcher
- Eurasian woodcock, malai mookkan
- Jack snipe, korai ullan
- Wood snipe
- Pin-tailed snipe
- Great snipe (A)
- Common snipe, visirivaal ullan
- Terek sandpiper, terek ullan
- Red-necked phalarope, chengazhuthu ullan
- Common sandpiper, ullan
- Green sandpiper, aatru ullan
- Grey-tailed tattler (A)
- Common redshank, pavazha kaali
- Marsh sandpiper, chinna pachai kaali
- Wood sandpiper, pori ullan
- Spotted redshank
- Common greenshank, pachai kaali

== Crab-plover ==
Order: Charadriiformes Family: Dromadidae

The crab-plover is related to the waders. It resembles a plover but with very long grey legs and a strong heavy black bill similar to a tern. It has black-and-white plumage, a long neck, partially webbed feet and a bill designed for eating crabs.

- Crab-plover, nandu thinni

== Coursers and pratincoles ==
Order: Charadriiformes Family: Glareolidae

Glareolidae is a family of wading birds comprising the pratincoles, which have short legs, long pointed wings and long forked tails, and the coursers, which have long legs, short wings and long, pointed bills which curve downwards.

- Indian courser, kal kuruvi
- Collared pratincole, karuvalaya tholkuruvi
- Oriental pratincole
- Small pratincole, chinna tholkuruvi

== Gulls, terns, and skimmers ==
Order: Charadriiformes Family: Laridae

Laridae is a family of both gulls and terns. Gulls are medium to large seabirds including kittiwakes. They are typically grey or white, often with black markings on the head or wings. They have stout, longish bills and webbed feet. Terns are a group of generally medium to large seabirds typically with grey or white plumage, often with black markings on the head. Most terns hunt fish by diving but some pick insects off the surface of fresh water. Terns are generally long-lived birds, with several species known to live in excess of 30 years.

- Brown noddy
- Lesser noddy
- Indian skimmer
- Slender-billed gull (A)
- Brown-headed gull, pazhuppu thalai kadal kakkai
- Black-headed gull, karunthalai kadal kakkai
- Pallas's gull
- Sooty gull (A)
- Lesser black-backed gull
- Gull-billed tern, parutha alagu aala
- Caspian tern
- Greater crested tern
- Lesser crested tern, kondai aala
- Sandwich tern
- Little tern
- Saunders's tern
- Bridled tern
- Sooty tern
- River tern, aatru aala
- Roseate tern
- Common tern, aala
- Black-bellied tern, karuppu vayitru aala
- Whiskered tern, meesai aala
- White-winged tern (A)

== Skuas ==
Order: Charadriiformes Family: Stercorariidae

The family Stercorariidae are, in general, medium to large birds, typically with grey or brown plumage, often with white markings on the wings. They nest on the ground in temperate and arctic regions and are long-distance migrants.

- South polar skua (A)
- Brown skua (A)
- Pomarine jaeger
- Parasitic jaeger
- Long-tailed jaeger (A)

== Tropicbirds ==
Order: Phaethontiformes Family: Phaethontidae

Tropicbirds are slender white birds of tropical oceans, with exceptionally long central tail feathers. Their heads and long wings have black markings.

- White-tailed tropicbird

== Austral storm petrels ==
Order: Procellariiformes Family: Oceanitidae

The austral storm petrels are relatives of the petrels and are the smallest seabirds. They feed on planktonic crustaceans and small fish picked from the surface, typically while hovering. The flight is fluttering and sometimes bat-like.

- Wilson's storm petrel

== Northern storm petrels ==
Order: Procellariiformes Family: Hydrobatidae

The northern storm petrels are relatives of the petrels and are the smallest seabirds. They feed on planktonic crustaceans and small fish picked from the surface, typically while hovering. The flight is fluttering and sometimes bat-like.

- Swinhoe's storm petrel

== Petrels, shearwaters, and diving petrels ==
Order: Procellariiformes Family: Procellariidae

The procellariids are the main group of medium-sized "true petrels", characterised by united nostrils with medium septum and a long outer functional primary.

- Streaked shearwater
- Wedge-tailed shearwater
- Flesh-footed shearwater
- Tropical shearwater

== Storks ==
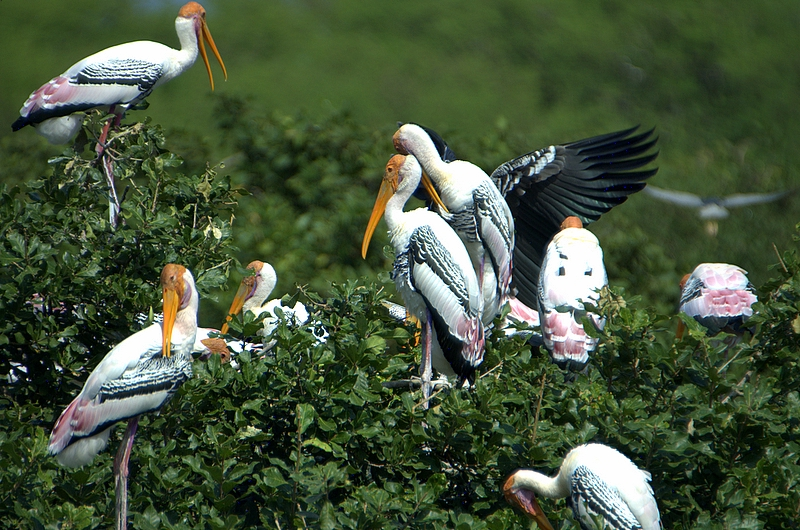
Painted stork

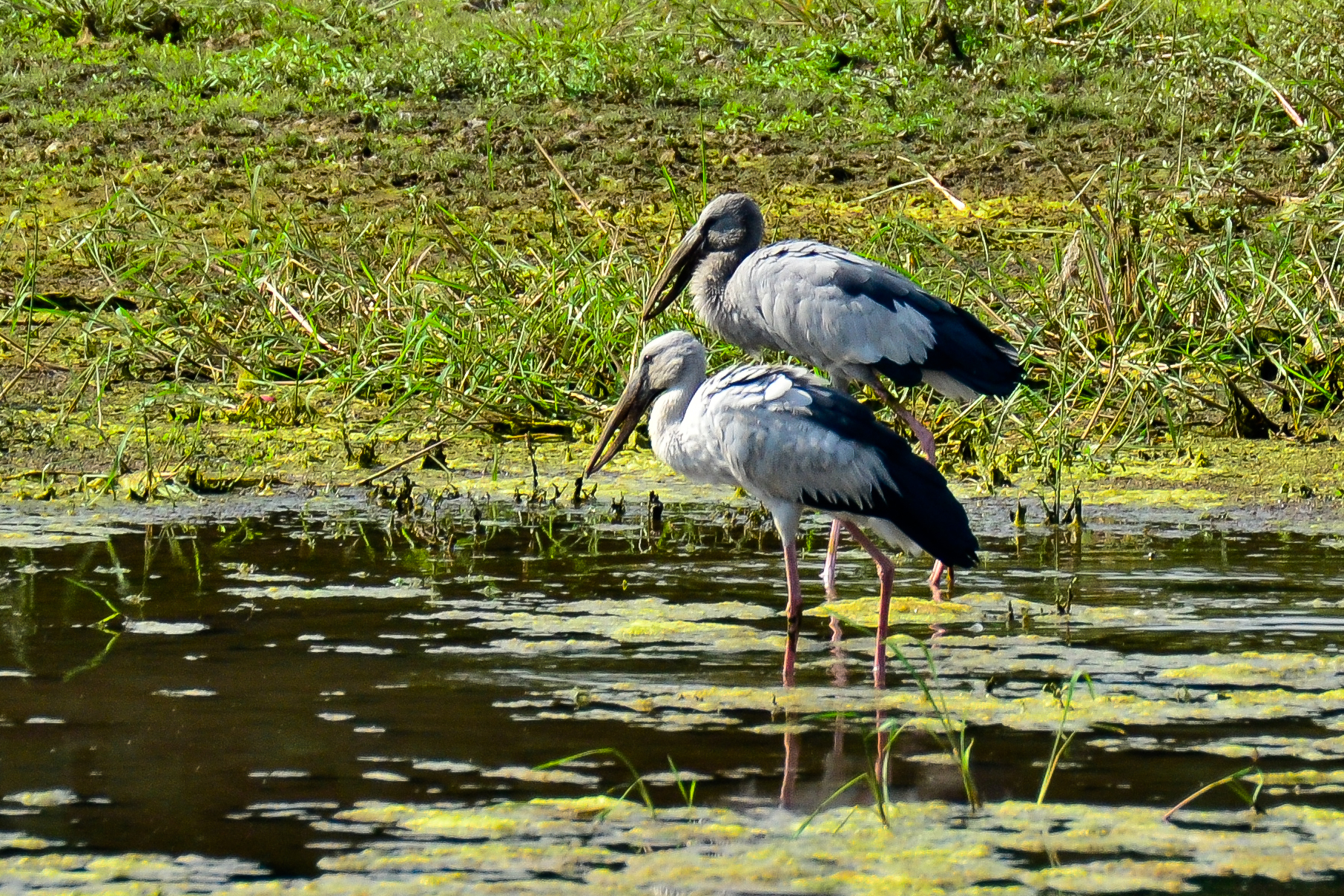
Asian openbill

Order: Ciconiiformes Family: Ciconiidae

Storks are large, long-legged, long-necked, wading birds with long, stout bills. Storks are mute, but bill-clattering is an important mode of communication at the nest. Their nests can be large and may be reused for many years. Many species are migratory.

- Painted stork, சங்குவளை நாரை (அ) மஞ்சள் மூக்கு நாரை
- Asian openbill, நத்தைக்குத்தி நாரை
- Black stork, கரு நாரை
- Woolly-necked stork, வெண்கழுத்து நாரை
- White stork, செங்கால் நாரை
- Black-necked stork
- Lesser adjutant, சிறிய போதா நாரை (A)
- Greater adjutant (A)

== Frigatebirds ==
Order: Suliformes Family: Fregatidae

Frigatebirds are large seabirds usually found over tropical oceans. They are large, black-and-white or completely black, with long wings and deeply forked tails. The males have coloured inflatable throat pouches. They do not swim or walk and cannot take off from a flat surface. Having the largest wingspan-to-body-weight ratio of any bird, they are essentially aerial, able to stay aloft for more than a week.

- Christmas frigatebird, Fregata andrewsi (A)
- Great frigatebird, Fregata minor (A)
- Lesser frigatebird, Fregata ariel

== Anhingas and darters ==
Order: Suliformes Family: Anhingidae

Anhingas or darters are often called "snake-birds" because of their long thin neck, which gives a snake-like appearance when they swim with their bodies submerged. The males have black and dark-brown plumage, an erectile crest on the nape and a larger bill than the female. The females have much paler plumage especially on the neck and underparts. The darters have completely webbed feet and their legs are short and set far back on the body. Their plumage is somewhat permeable, like that of cormorants, and they spread their wings to dry after diving.

- Oriental darter, பாம்புத்தாரா

== Cormorants and shags ==
Order: Suliformes Family: Phalacrocoracidae

Phalacrocoracidae is a family of medium to large coastal, fish-eating seabirds that includes cormorants and shags. Plumage colouration varies, with the majority having mainly dark plumage, some species being black-and-white and a few being colourful.

- Little cormorant, சிறிய நீர்க்காகம்
- Indian cormorant, இந்திய நீர்க்காகம்
- Great cormorant, பெரிய நீர்க்காகம்

== Ibises and spoonbills ==
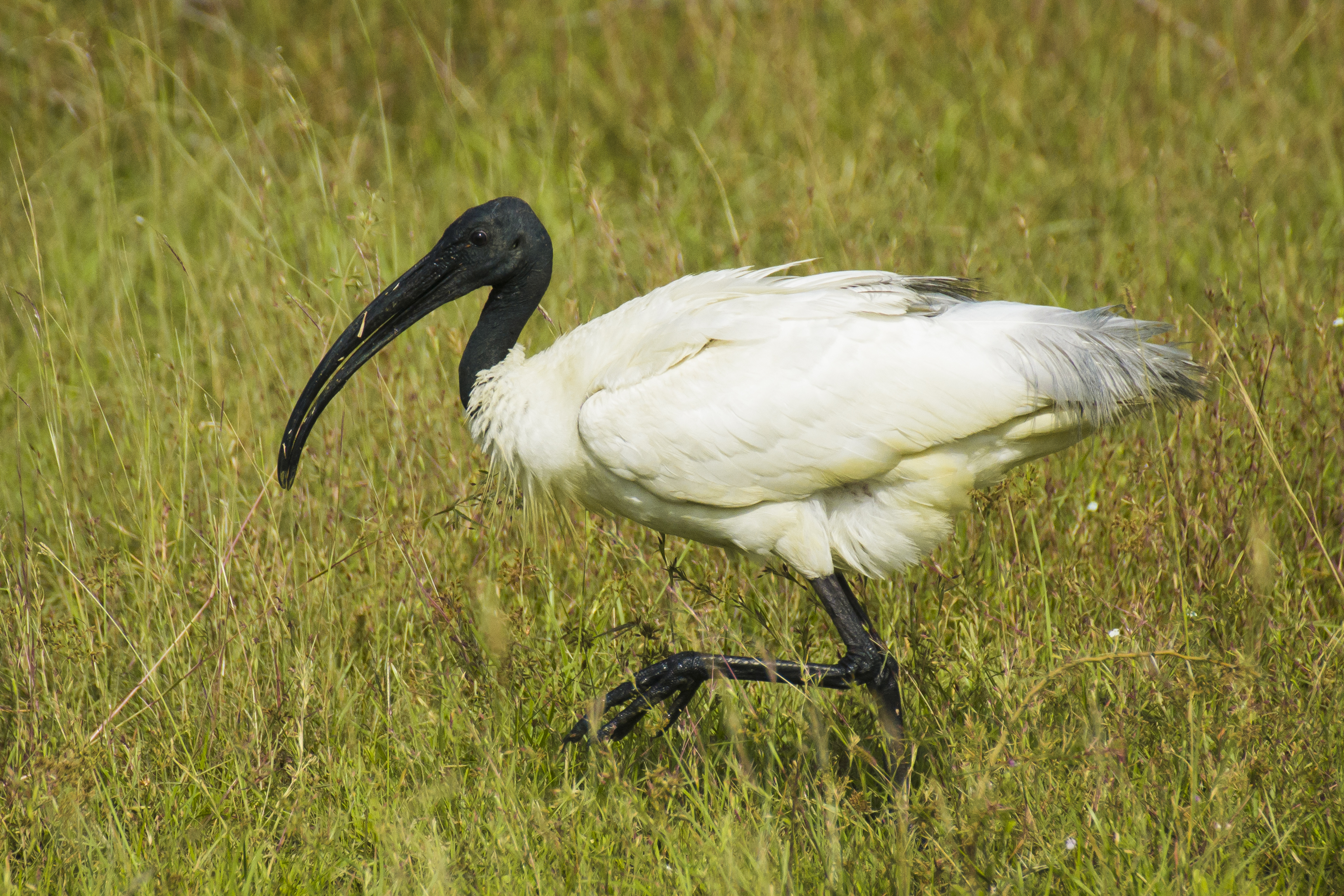
Black-headed ibis

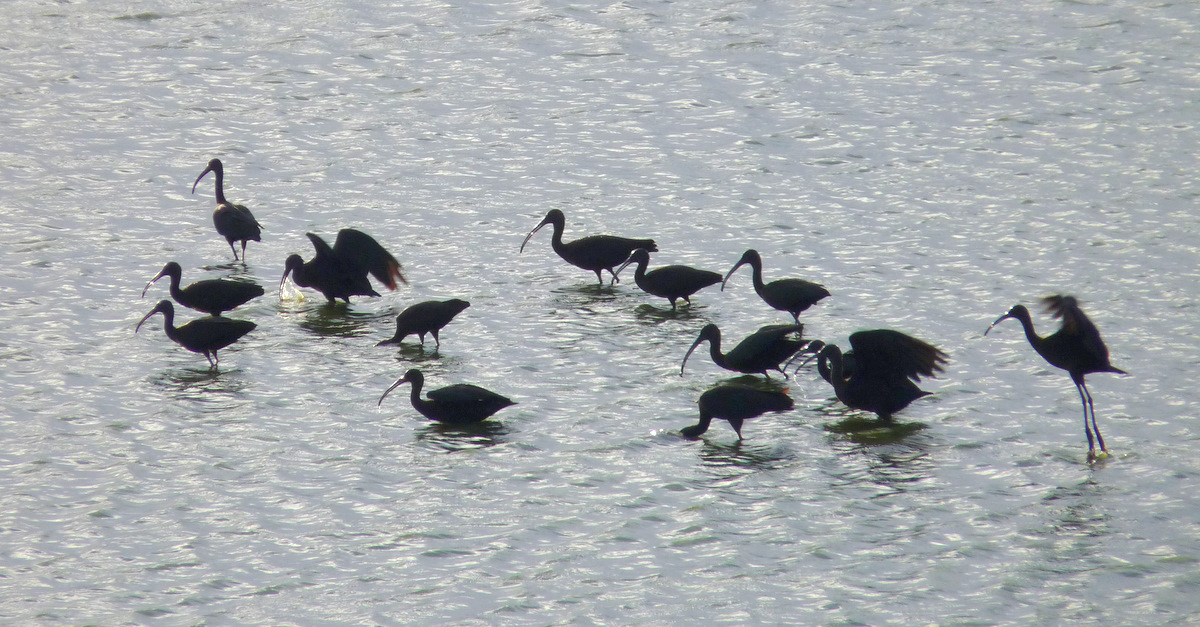
Glossy ibis

Order: Pelecaniformes Family: Threskiornithidae

Threskiornithidae is a family of large terrestrial and wading birds which includes the ibises and spoonbills. They have long, broad wings with 11 primary and about 20 secondary feathers. They are strong fliers and despite their size and weight, very capable soarers.

- Black-headed ibis, கருந்தலை அன்றில்
- Red-naped ibis
- Glossy ibis, சின்ன அன்றில்
- Eurasian spoonbill, கரண்டிவாயன்

== Herons and bitterns ==
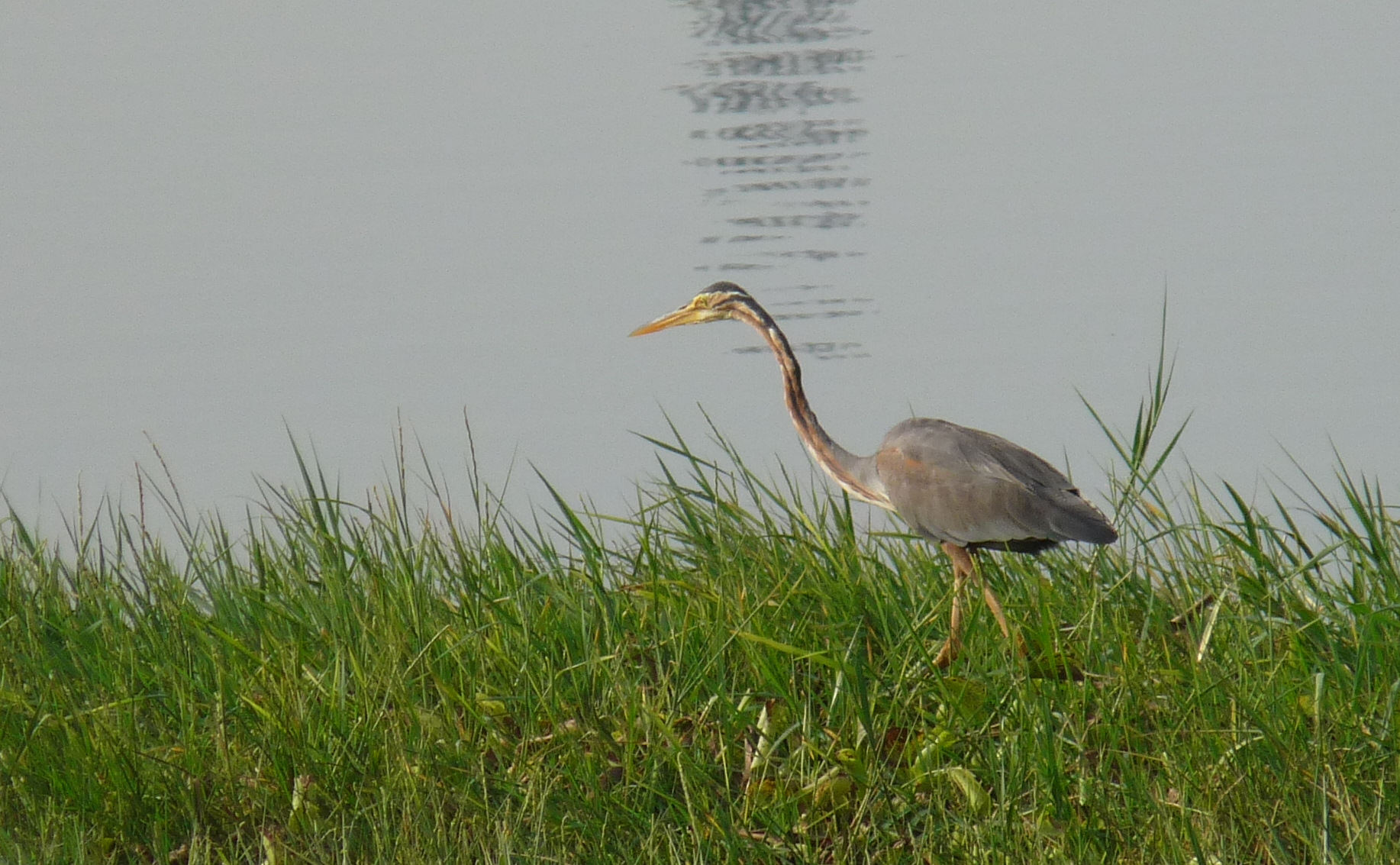
Purple heron

Order: Pelecaniformes Family: Ardeidae

The family Ardeidae contains the bitterns, herons and egrets. Herons and egrets are medium to large wading birds with long necks and legs. Bitterns tend to be shorter necked and more wary. Members of Ardeidae fly with their necks retracted, unlike other long-necked birds such as storks, ibises and spoonbills.

- Eurasian bittern
- Little bittern
- Yellow bittern, மஞ்சள் குருகு
- Cinnamon bittern
- Black bittern, கருங்குருகு
- Malayan night heron
- Black-crowned night heron, இராக்கொக்கு (அ) வக்கா
- Striated heron, சின்ன பச்சைக் கொக்கு
- Indian pond heron, குளத்துக் கொக்கு
- Chinese pond heron
- Eastern cattle egret, உண்ணிக் கொக்கு
- Grey heron, சாம்பல் கொக்கு
- Purple heron, செந்நீலக் கொக்கு
- Great egret, நெட்டைக் கொக்கு
- Intermediate egret, நடுவாந்திரக் கொக்கு
- Little egret, சின்ன கொக்கு
- Western reef heron, கரைக் கொக்கு
- Pacific reef heron

== Pelicans ==
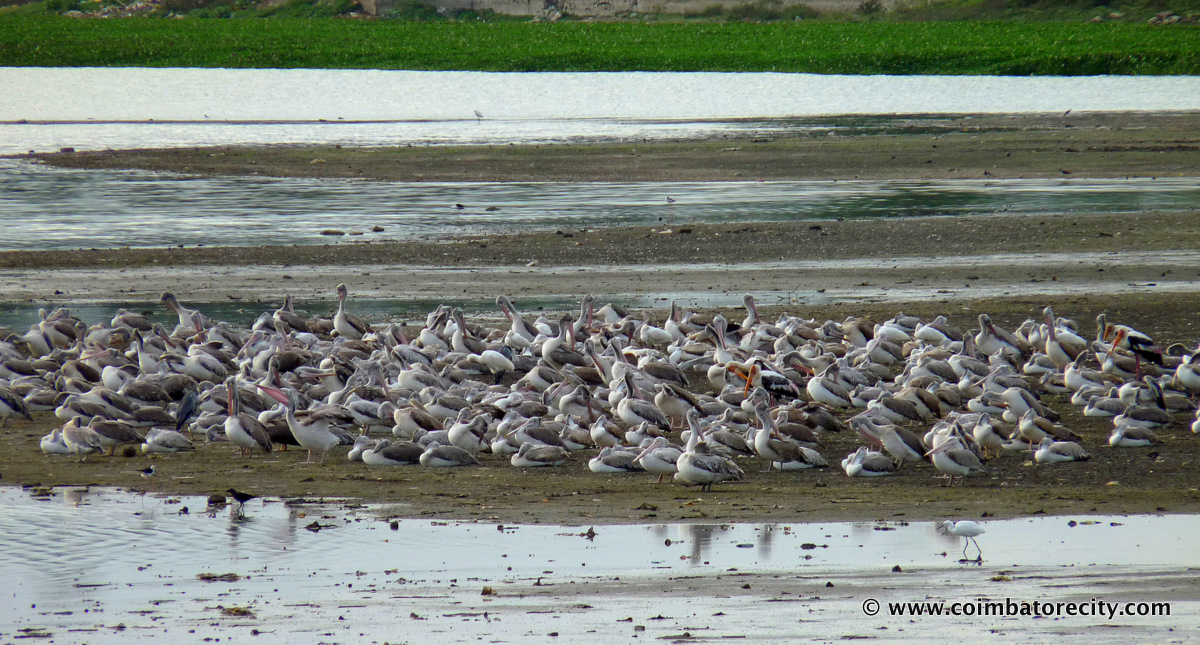
Spot-billed pelicans

Order: Pelecaniformes Family: Pelecanidae

Pelicans are large water birds with a distinctive pouch under their beak. As with other members of the order Pelecaniformes, they have webbed feet with four toes.

- Great white pelican
- Spot-billed pelican, சாம்பல் கூழைக்கடா

== Osprey ==
Order: Accipitriformes Family: Pandionidae

The family Pandionidae contains usually only one species, the osprey. The osprey is a medium-large raptor which is a specialist fish-eater.

- Osprey, விராலடிப்பான்

== Kites, hawks, and eagles ==
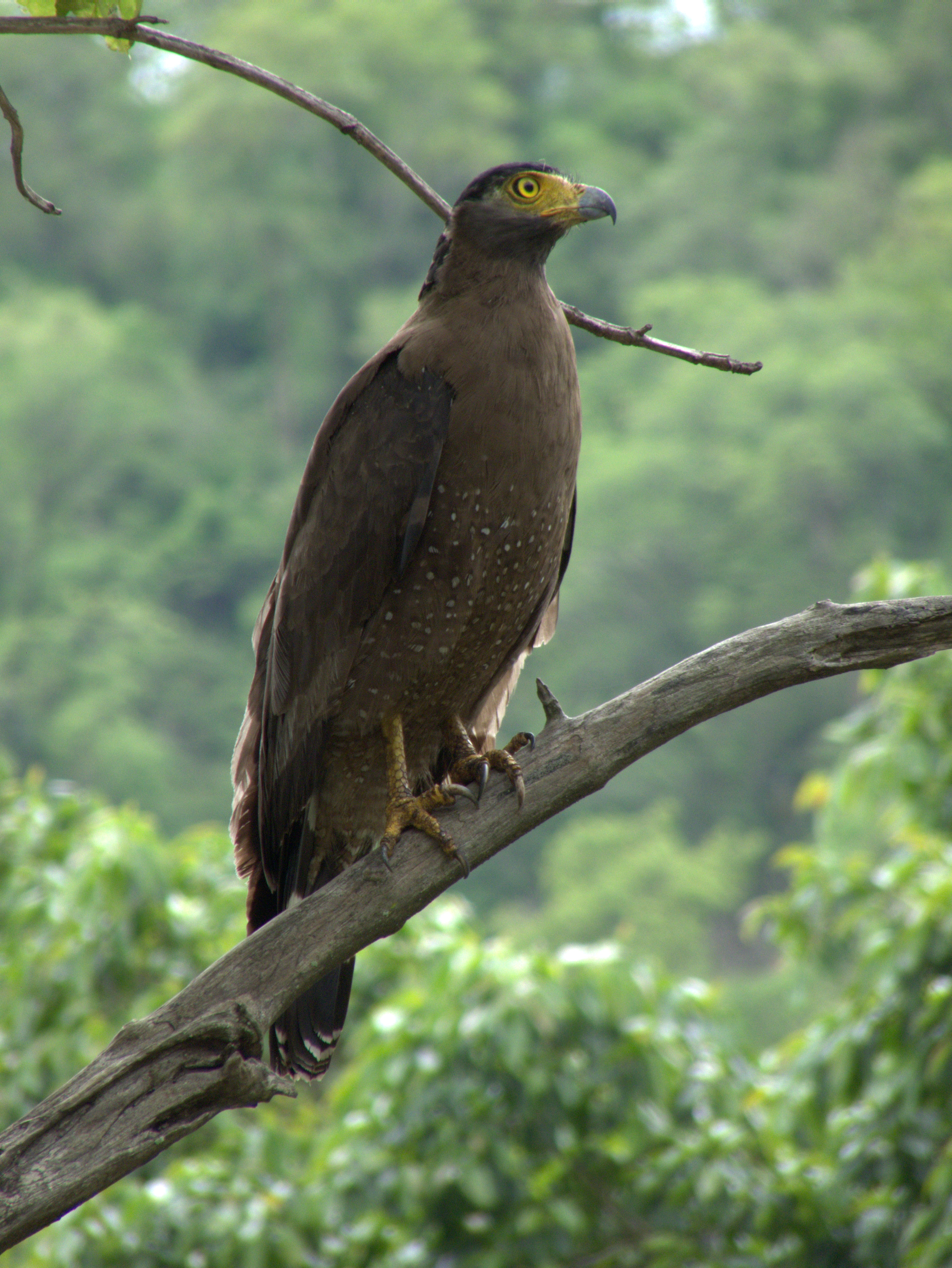
Crested serpent eagle

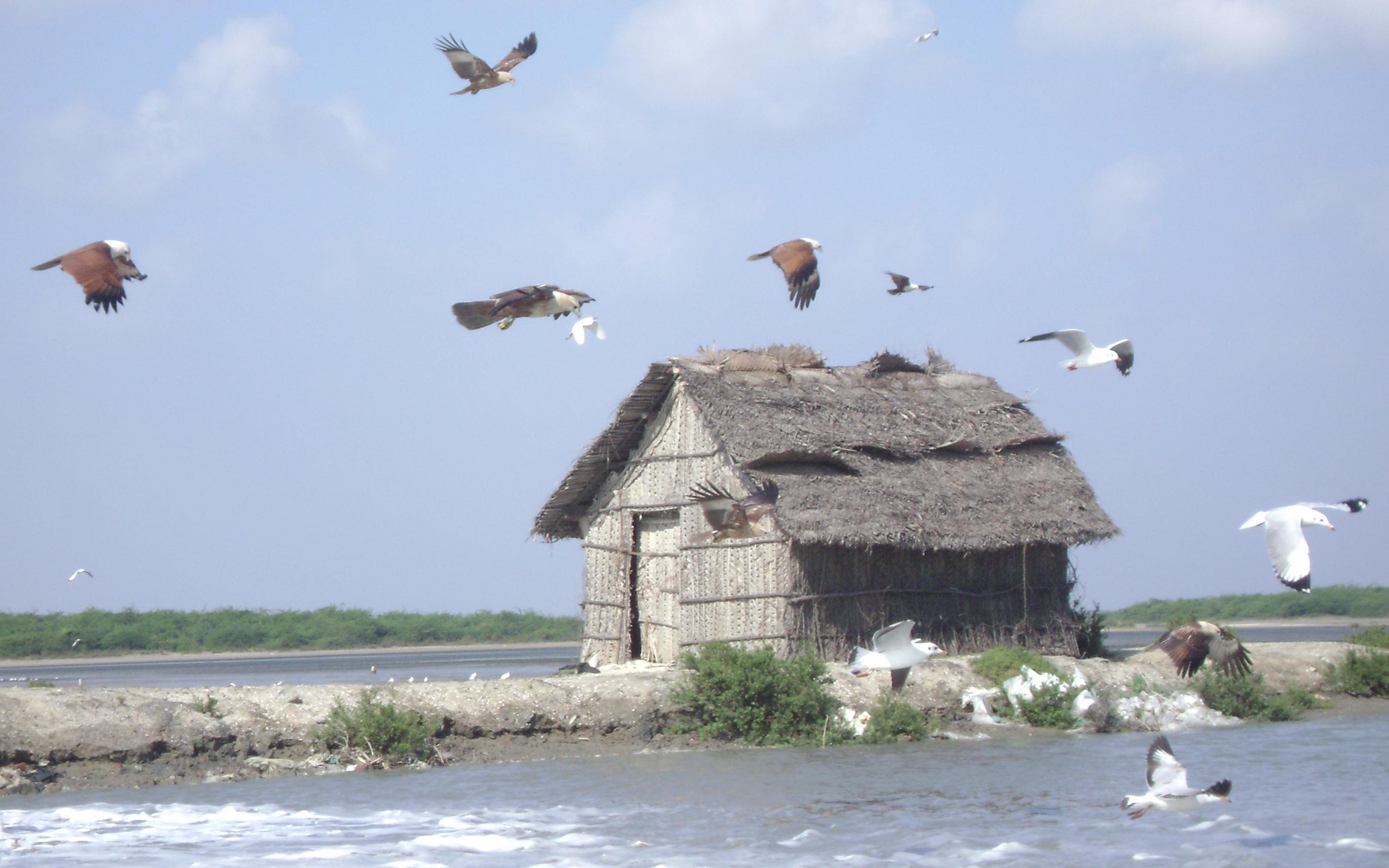
Brahminy kites

Order: Accipitriformes Family: Accipitridae

Accipitridae is a family of birds of prey, which includes hawks, eagles, kites, harriers and Old World vultures. These birds have powerful hooked beaks for tearing flesh from their prey, strong legs, powerful talons and keen eyesight.

- Black-winged kite, மொசலடி
- Egyptian vulture, மஞ்சள்முக பாறுக்கழுகு
- European honey buzzard (A)
- Crested honey buzzard, தேன் பருந்து
- Jerdon's baza, கொண்டை வல்லூறு
- Black baza, கரும் கொண்டை வல்லூறு
- White-rumped vulture, வெண்முதுகுப் பாறுக்கழுகு
- Indian vulture, இந்தியப் பாறுக்கழுகு
- Griffon vulture
- Red-headed vulture, செந்தலை பாறுக்கழுகு
- Cinereous vulture
- Crested serpent eagle, காட்டுப் பாம்புக்கழுகு
- Short-toed snake eagle, ஓணான் கொத்திக் கழுகு
- Changeable hawk-eagle, குடுமிக்கழுகு
- Legge's hawk-eagle
- Rufous-bellied eagle, செவ்வயிற்றுக் கழுகு
- Black eagle, கருங்கழுகு
- Indian spotted eagle
- Greater spotted eagle, pulli parundhu
- Booted eagle, வெண்தோள் கழுகு
- Tawny eagle, aaalipparundhu
- Steppe eagle
- Eastern imperial eagle
- Bonelli's eagle, இராசாளிக் கழுகு
- Crested goshawk, குடுமி வல்லூறு
- Shikra, வல்லூறு
- Besra, chinna valluru
- Eurasian sparrowhawk
- Eurasian goshawk
- Western marsh harrier, சதுப்புநில பூனைப்பருந்து
- Eastern marsh harrier (A)
- Pallid harrier, வெள்ளை பூனைப்பருந்து
- Pied harrier, கருப்பு வெள்ளை பூனைப்பருந்து
- Montagu's harrier, மாண்டேகு பூனைப்பருந்து
- Black kite, கரும்பருந்து
- Brahminy kite, செம்பருந்து
- White-bellied sea eagle, வெள்ளை ஆழிக்கழுகு
- Lesser fish eagle, சிறிய மீன்பிடி கழுகு
- Grey-headed fish eagle
- White-eyed buzzard, வெள்ளைக்கண் பருந்து (அ) வெள்ளைக்கண் வைரி
- Long-legged buzzard
- Common buzzard

== Barn owls ==
Order: Strigiformes Family: Tytonidae

Barn owls are medium to large owls with large heads and characteristic heart-shaped faces. They have long strong legs with powerful talons.

- Eastern barn owl, koogai andhai
- Eastern grass owl
- Sri Lanka bay owl

== Owls ==
Order: Strigiformes Family: Strigidae

The typical owls are small to large solitary nocturnal birds of prey. They have large forward-facing eyes and ears, a hawk-like beak and a conspicuous circle of feathers around each eye called a facial disk.

- Indian scops owl
- Oriental scops owl
- Eurasian eagle owl
- Indian eagle owl, komban aandhai / kottaan
- Spot-bellied eagle owl
- Dusky eagle owl
- Brown fish owl, poomar aandhai
- Mottled wood owl, pooripulli aandhai
- Brown wood owl
- Jungle owlet, chinna kattu aandhai
- Spotted owlet, pulli aandhai
- Brown boobook, vettaikara aandhai
- Long-eared owl
- Short-eared owl, kuttai kaadhu aandhai

== Trogons ==
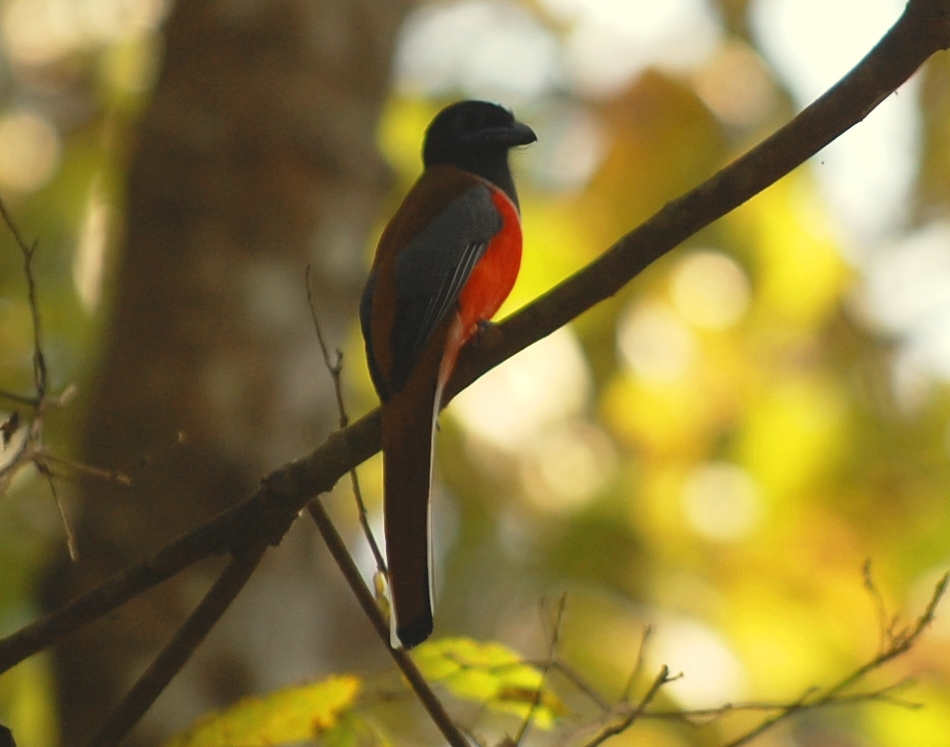
Malabar trogon

Order: Trogoniformes Family: Trogonidae

The family Trogonidae includes trogons and quetzals. Found in tropical woodlands worldwide, they feed on insects and fruit, and their broad bills and weak legs reflect their diet and arboreal habits. Although their flight is fast, they are reluctant to fly any distance. Trogons have soft, often colourful, feathers with distinctive male and female plumage.

- Malabar trogon, theekakkai

== Hoopoes ==
Order: Bucerotiformes Family: Upupidae

Hoopoes have black, white and orangey-pink colouring with a large erectile crest on their head.

- Eurasian hoopoe, kondalathi

== Hornbills ==
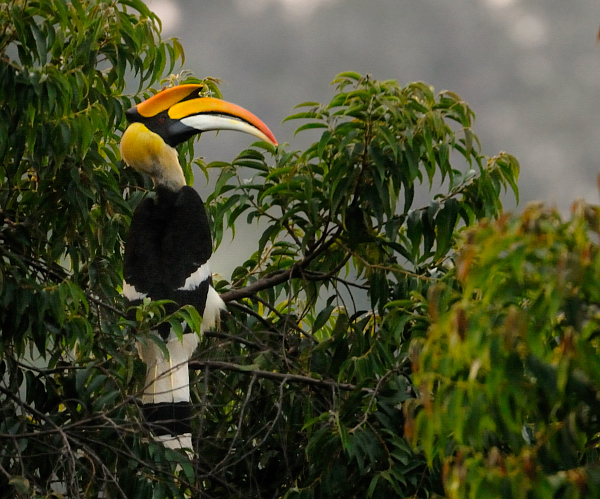
Great hornbill

Order: Bucerotiformes Family: Bucerotidae

Hornbills are a group of birds whose bill is shaped like a cow's horn, but without a twist, sometimes with a casque on the upper mandible. Frequently, the bill is brightly coloured.

- Great hornbill, பெரிய இருவாசி
- Malabar pied hornbill, karuppu vellai iruvaayan
- Malabar grey hornbill, ottrai iruvaayan
- Indian grey hornbill, saambal iruvaayan

== Rollers ==
Order: Coraciiformes Family: Coraciidae

Rollers resemble crows in size and build, but are more closely related to the kingfishers and bee-eaters. They share the colourful appearance of those groups with blues and browns predominating. The two inner front toes are connected, but the outer toe is not.

- Indian roller, panangadai
- European roller (A)
- Oriental dollarbird

== Kingfishers ==
Order: Coraciiformes Family: Alcedinidae

Kingfishers are medium-sized birds with large heads, long, pointed bills, short legs and stubby tails.

- Stork-billed kingfisher, peria alagu meenkothi
- White-throated kingfisher, venthondai meenkothi
- Black-capped kingfisher, karunthalai meenkothi
- Collared kingfisher
- Blue-eared kingfisher
- Common kingfisher
- Oriental dwarf kingfisher, chinna meenkothi
- Pied kingfisher, karuppu vellai meenkothi

== Bee-eaters ==
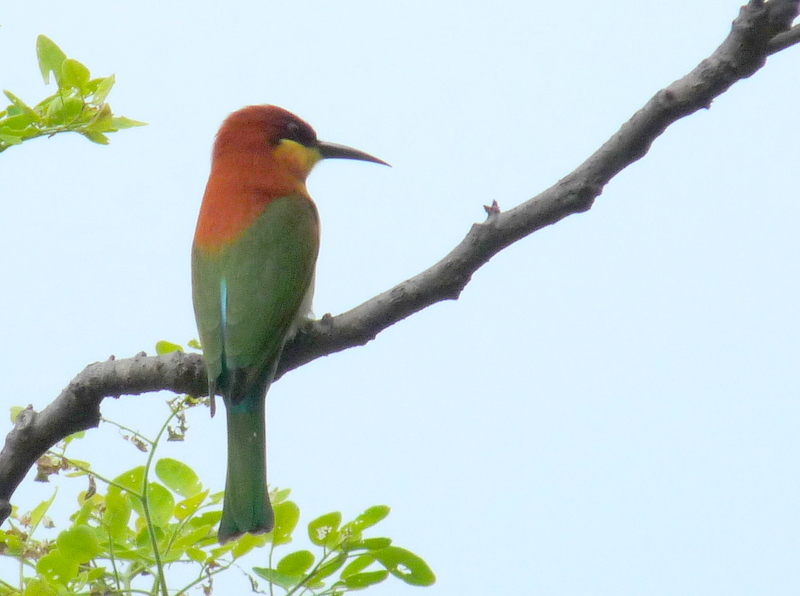
Chestnut-headed bee-eater

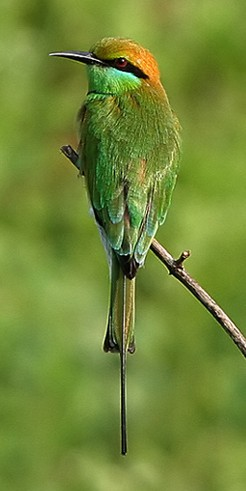
Asian green bee-eater

Order: Coraciiformes Family: Meropidae

The bee-eaters are a group of near passerine birds in the family Meropidae. Most species are found in Africa but others occur in southern Europe, Madagascar, Australia and New Guinea. They are characterised by richly coloured plumage, slender bodies and usually elongated central tail feathers. All are colourful and have long downturned bills and pointed wings, which give them a swallow-like appearance when seen from afar.

- Blue-bearded bee-eater, காட்டுப் பஞ்சுருட்டான்
- Asian green bee-eater, பச்சைப் பஞ்சுருட்டான்
- Blue-cheeked bee-eater
- Blue-tailed bee-eater, நீலவால் பஞ்சுருட்டான்
- Chestnut-headed bee-eater, செந்தலைப் பஞ்சுருட்டான்
- European bee-eater, ஐரோப்பியப் பஞ்சுருட்டான்

== Asian barbets ==
Order: Piciformes Family: Megalaimidae

The Asian barbets are plump birds, with short necks and large heads. They get their name from the bristles which fringe their heavy bills. Most species are brightly coloured.

- Brown-headed barbet, kattu pachai kukkuruvaan
- White-cheeked barbet, chinna kukkuruvaan
- Malabar barbet
- Coppersmith barbet, chemmarbu kukkuruvaan

== Woodpeckers ==
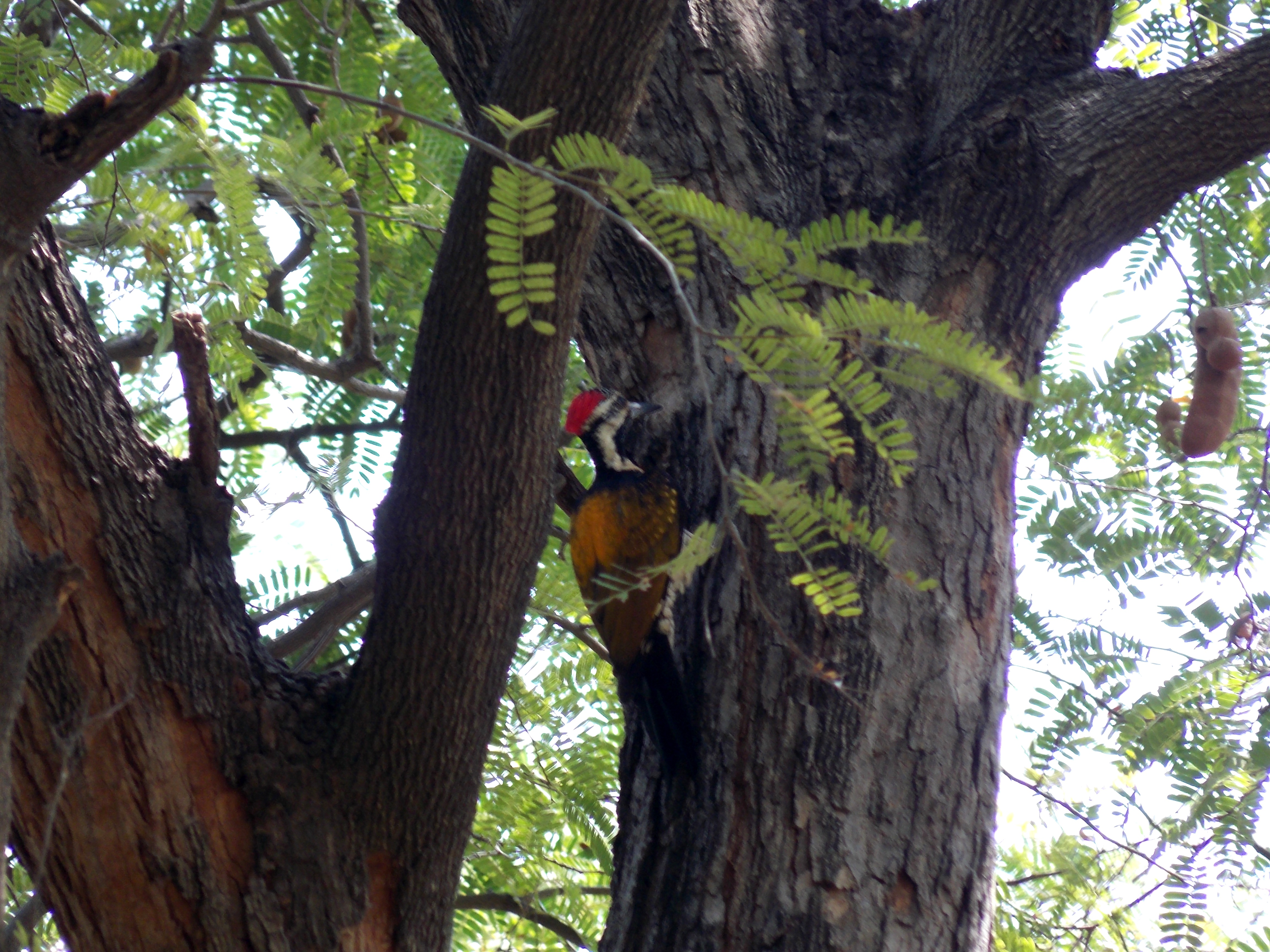
Black-rumped flameback

Order: Piciformes Family: Picidae

Woodpeckers are small to medium-sized birds with chisel-like beaks, short legs, stiff tails and long tongues used for capturing insects. Some species have feet with two toes pointing forward and two backward, while several species have only three toes. Many woodpeckers have the habit of tapping noisily on tree trunks with their beaks.

- Eurasian wryneck
- Speckled piculet, pulli maram kothi
- Heart-spotted woodpecker, karumpulli maram kothi
- Brown-capped pygmy woodpecker, sinna maram kothi
- Yellow-crowned woodpecker, manjal netri maram kothi
- White-bellied woodpecker, பெரிய கருப்பு மரங்கோத்தி
- Lesser yellownape, manjal pidari maram kothi
- Streak-throated woodpecker, sethil vayitru maram kothi
- Himalayan flameback (I)
- Common flameback
- Black-rumped flameback
- Greater flameback, peria ponmudhugu maram kothi
- White-naped woodpecker
- Rufous woodpecker, karum sivappu maram kothi

== Caracaras and falcons ==
Order: Falconiformes Family: Falconidae

Falconidae is a family of diurnal birds of prey. They differ from hawks, eagles and kites in that they kill with their beaks instead of their talons.

- Lesser kestrel
- Common kestrel, sivappu vallooru
- Red-necked falcon, senthalai vallooru
- Amur falcon, falco amurensis
- Eurasian hobby
- Oriental hobby
- Laggar falcon
- Peregrine falcon, pori vallooru

== Old World parrots ==
Order: Psittaciformes Family: Psittaculidae

Characteristic features of parrots include a strong curved bill, an upright stance, strong legs, and clawed zygodactyl feet. Many parrots are vividly coloured, and some are multi-coloured. In size they range from 8 cm (3.1 in) to 1 m (3.3 ft) in length. Old World parrots are found from Africa east across south and southeast Asia and Oceania to Australia and New Zealand.

- Blossom-headed parakeet
- Plum-headed parakeet, செந்தலைக் கிளி
- Blue-winged parakeet, சோலைக்கிளி
- Alexandrine parakeet, பெரிய பச்சைக்கிளி
- Rose-ringed parakeet, பச்சைக்கிளி
- Vernal hanging parrot, சின்னக்கிளி

== Pittas ==
Order: Passeriformes Family: Pittidae

Pittas are medium-sized by passerine standards and are stocky, with fairly long, strong legs, short tails and stout bills. Many are brightly coloured. They spend the majority of their time on wet forest floors, eating snails, insects and similar invertebrates.

- Indian pitta, thottakkallan

== Vangas, helmetshrikes, woodshrikes, and shrike-flycatchers ==
Order: Passeriformes Family: Vangidae

The woodshrikes are similar in build to the shrikes.

- Bar-winged flycatcher-shrike, hemipus picatus, karuppu vellai keechaan
- Malabar woodshrike
- Common woodshrike, kattu keechaan

== Woodswallows, butcherbirds, and peltops ==
Order: Passeriformes Family: Artamidae

The woodswallows are soft-plumaged, somber-coloured passerine birds. They are smooth, agile flyers with moderately large, semi-triangular wings.

- Ashy woodswallow, sambal thangaivilaan

== Ioras ==
Order: Passeriformes Family: Aegithinidae

The ioras are bulbul-like birds of open forest or thorn scrub, but whereas that group tends to be drab in colouration, ioras are sexually dimorphic, with the males being brightly plumaged in yellows and greens.

- Common iora, manja chittu
- Marshall's iora

== Cuckooshrikes ==
Order: Passeriformes Family: Campephagidae

The cuckooshrikes are small to medium-sized passerine birds. They are predominantly greyish with white and black, although some species are brightly coloured.

- White-bellied minivet
- Small minivet, chinna min chittu
- Orange minivet, min chittu,
- Ashy minivet
- Swinhoe's minivet (A)
- Large cuckooshrike, kuyil keechaan
- Pied triller (A)
- Black-winged cuckooshrike
- Black-headed cuckooshrike, karunthalai kuyil keechaan

== Shrikes ==
Order: Passeriformes Family: Laniidae

Shrikes are passerine birds known for their habit of catching other birds and small animals and impaling the uneaten portions of their bodies on thorns. A typical shrike's beak is hooked, like a bird of prey.

- Brown shrike, pazhuppu keechaan
- Isabelline shrike
- Bay-backed shrike, karunchivappu mudhugu keechaan
- Long-tailed shrike, chemmudhugu keechaan
- Great grey shrike

== Figbirds, orioles, and turnagra ==
Order: Passeriformes Family: Oriolidae

The Old World orioles are colourful passerine birds. They are not related to the New World orioles.

- Black-hooded oriole
- Indian golden oriole, maangkuil
- Black-naped oriole

== Drongos ==
Order: Passeriformes Family: Dicruridae

The drongos are mostly black or dark grey in colour, sometimes with metallic tints. They have long forked tails, and some Asian species have elaborate tail decorations. They have short legs and sit very upright when perched, like a shrike. They flycatch or take prey from the ground.

- Bronzed drongo, karumpachai karichaan
- Greater racket-tailed drongo, thuduppu vaal karichaan
- Hair-crested drongo
- Ashy drongo, karichaan
- White-bellied drongo, vellai vayitru karichaan
- Black drongo, karung karichaan

== Fantails and silktails ==
Order: Passeriformes Family: Rhipiduridae

The fantails are small insectivorous birds which are specialist aerial feeders.

- White-throated fantail, venthondai visirival eeppidippan
- White-spotted fantail
- White-browed fantail, venpuruva visirivall eeppidippan

== Monarchs ==
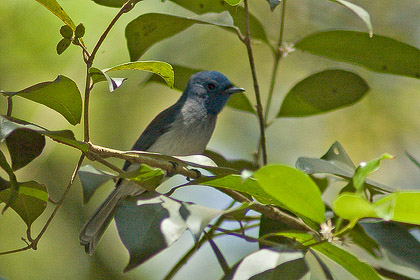
Black-naped monarch

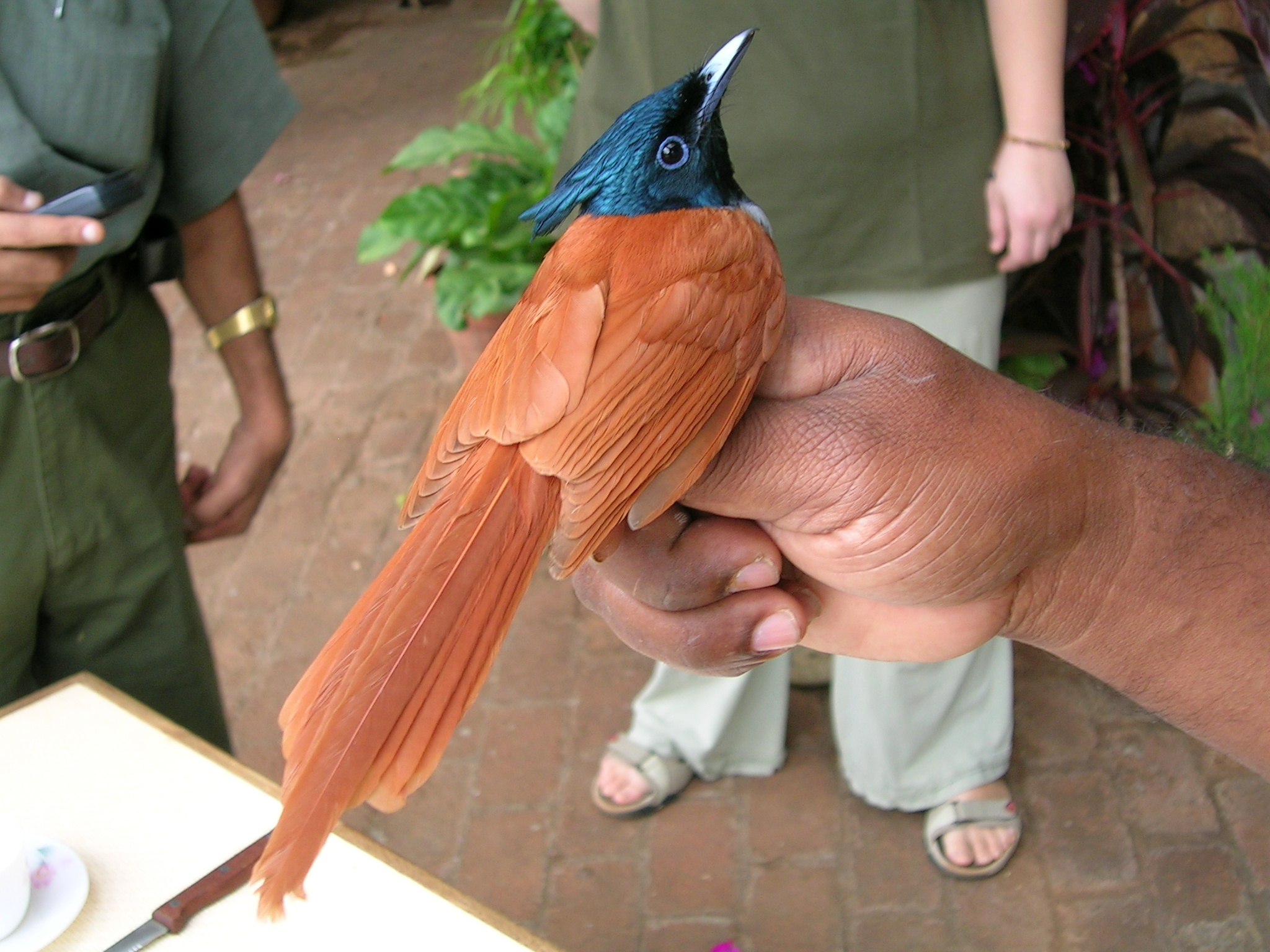
Indian paradise flycatcher

Order: Passeriformes Family: Monarchidae

The monarch flycatchers are small to medium-sized insectivorous passerines which hunt by flycatching.

- Black-naped monarch, karumpidari neela eeppidippan
- Indian paradise flycatcher, வேதிவால் குருவி

== Crows and jays ==
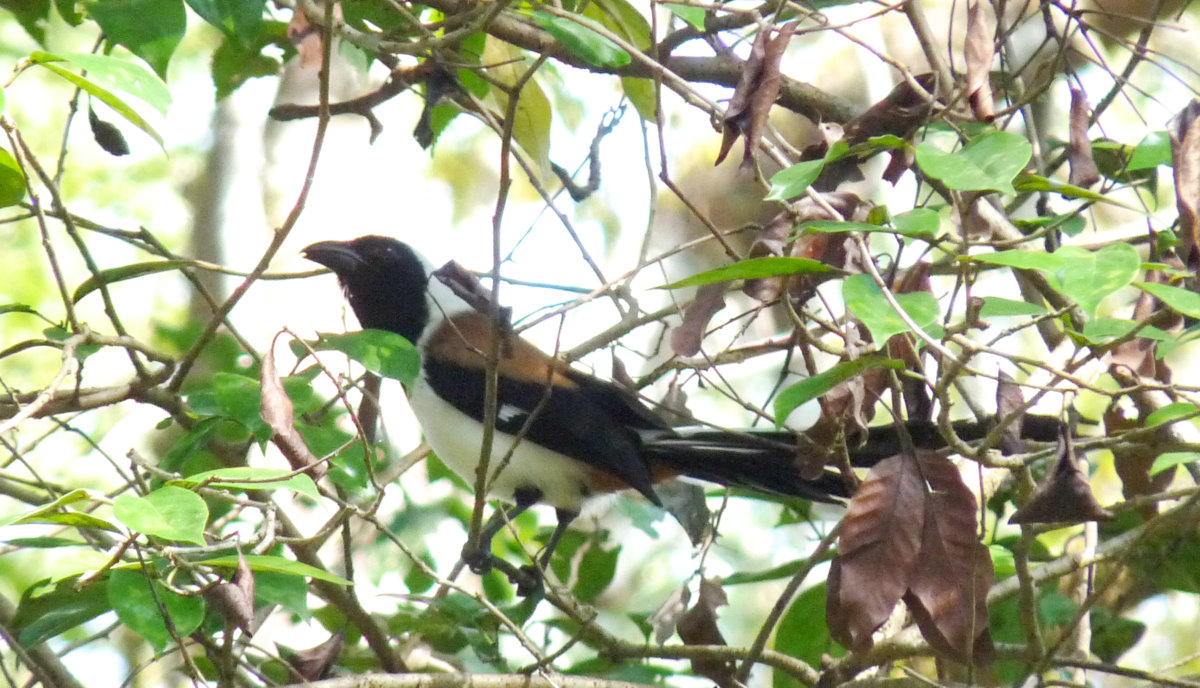
White-bellied treepie

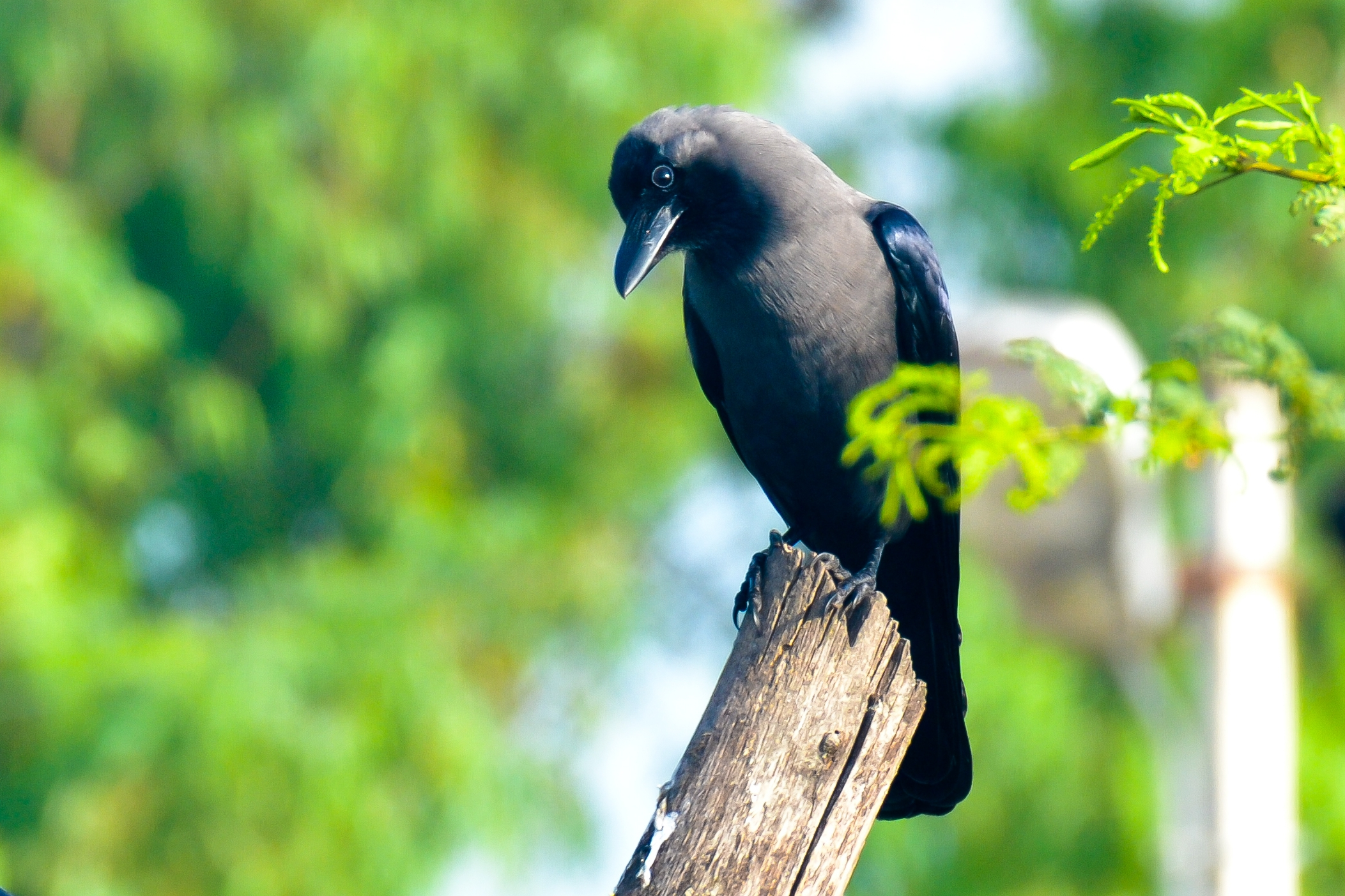
House crow

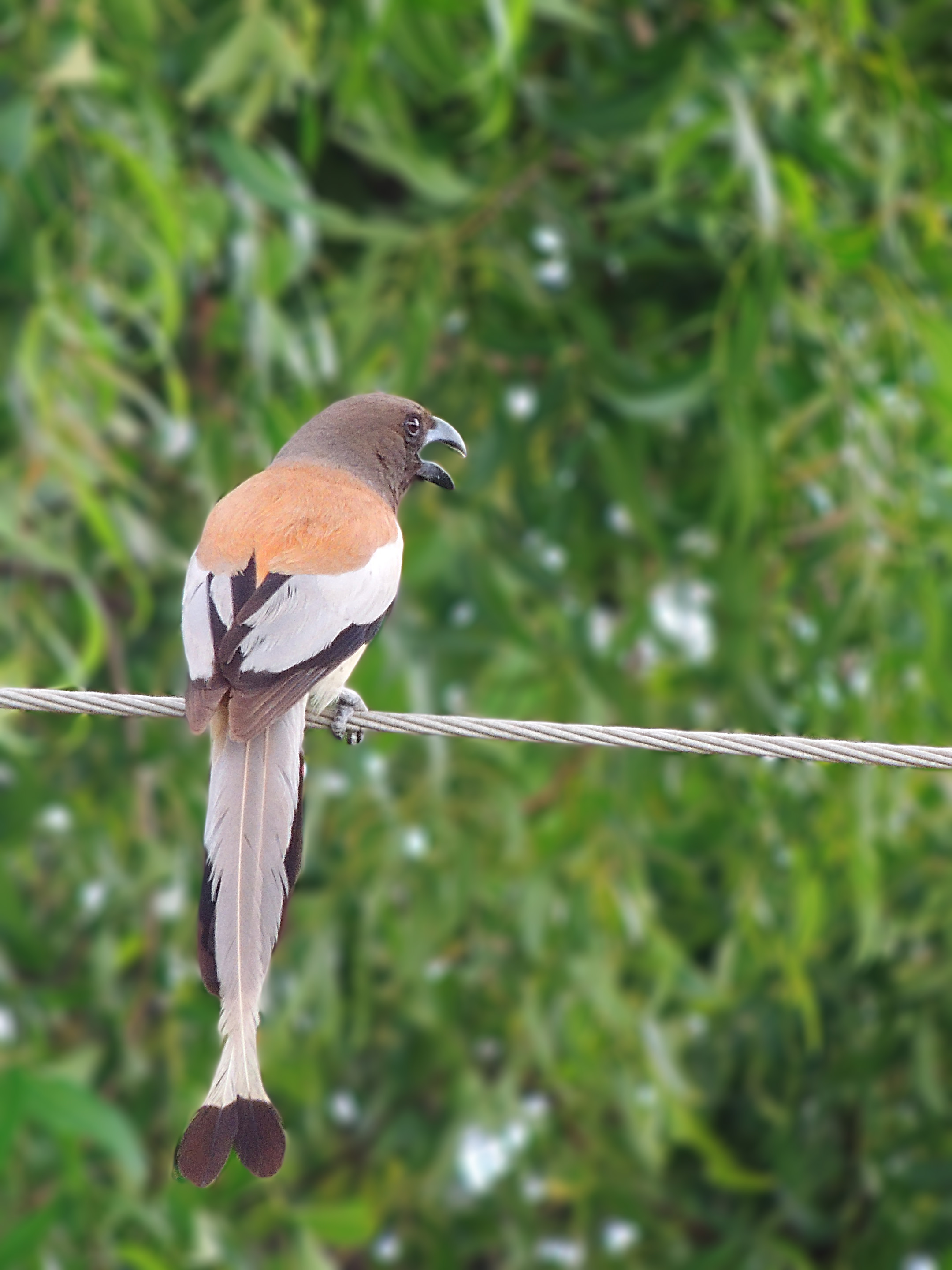
Rufous treepie

Order: Passeriformes Family: Corvidae

The family Corvidae includes crows, ravens, jays, choughs, magpies, treepies, nutcrackers and ground jays. Corvids are above average in size among the Passeriformes, and some of the larger species show high levels of intelligence.

- Rufous treepie, வால் காக்கை
- Grey treepie
- White-bellied treepie, vellai vayitru vaal kaakkai
- House crow, காகம்
- Large-billed crow, அண்டங்காக்கை
- Eastern jungle crow
- Indian jungle crow

== Fairy flycatchers ==
Order: Passeriformes Family: Stenostiridae

Most of the species of this small family are found in Africa, though a few inhabit tropical Asia. They are not closely related to other birds called "flycatchers".

- Grey-headed canary-flycatcher, sambal thalai eeppidippan

== Tits and chickadees ==
Order: Passeriformes Family: Paridae

The Paridae are mainly small stocky woodland species with short stout bills. Some have crests. They are adaptable birds, with a mixed diet including seeds and insects.

- Cinereous tit, pattani kuruvi
- White-naped tit
- Indian black-lored tit
- Yellow-cheeked tit

== Larks ==
Order: Passeriformes Family: Alaudidae

Larks are small terrestrial birds with often extravagant songs and display flights. Most larks are fairly dull in appearance. Their food is insects and seeds.

- Rufous-tailed lark, sigappuvaal vanambai
- Ashy-crowned sparrow-lark, sambalthalai vaanambadi
- Singing bush lark
- Indian bush lark, sivappu irakkai vaanambadi
- Jerdon's bush lark, pudhar vaanambadi
- Oriental skylark, chinna vaanambadi
- Eurasian skylark
- Sykes's lark
- Malabar lark
- Mongolian short-toed lark
- Greater short-toed lark

== Bulbuls ==
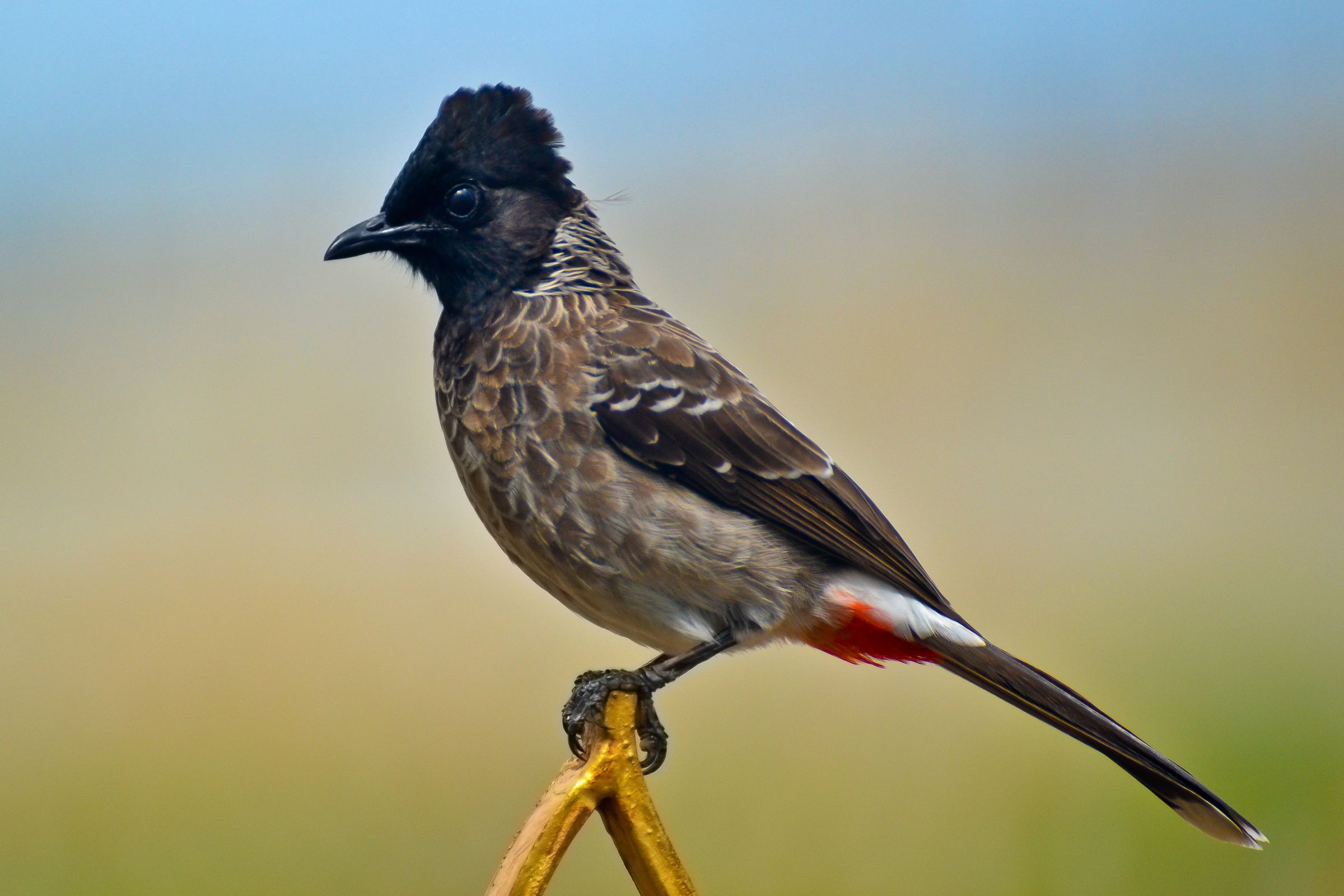
Red-vented bulbul in Tirunelveli

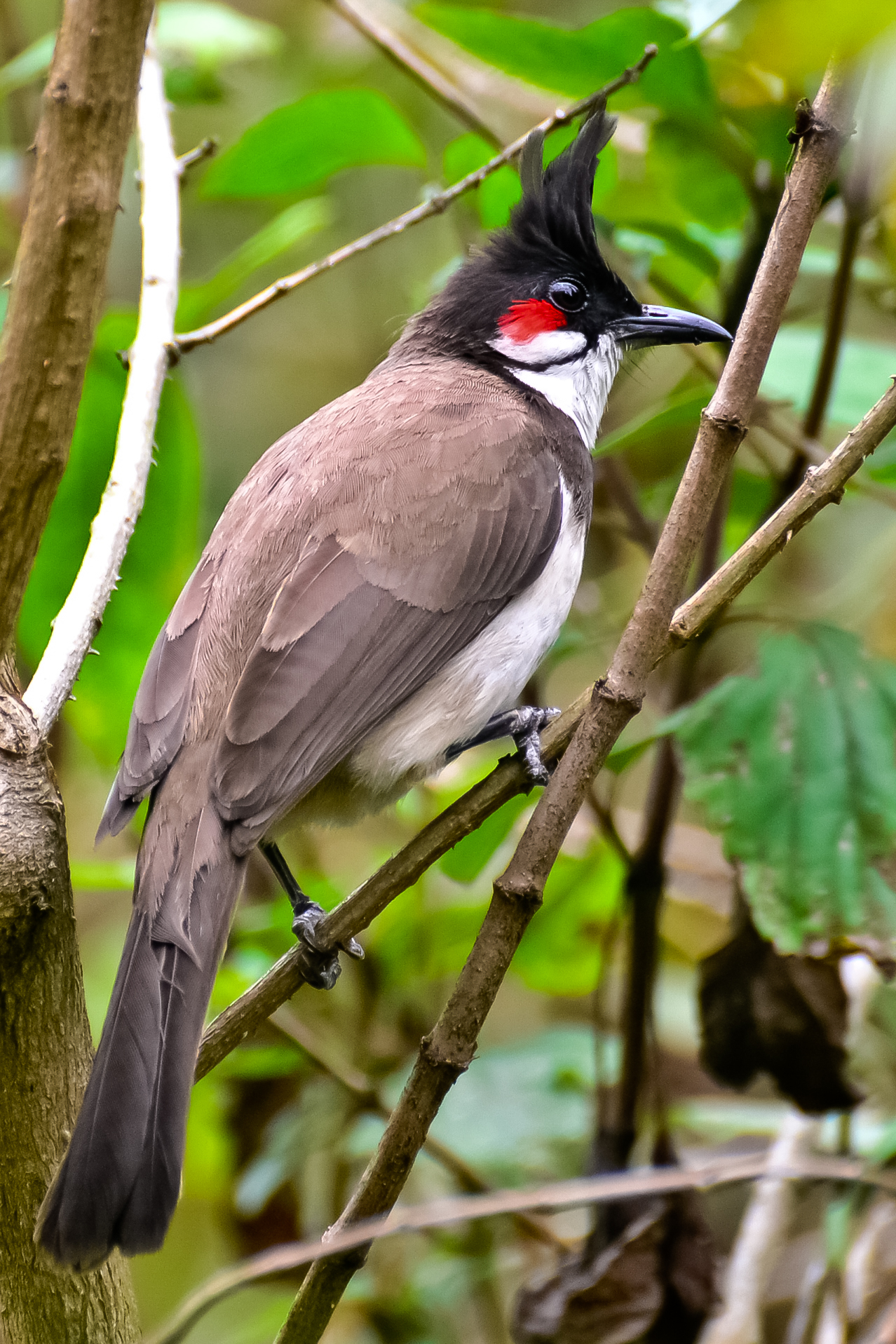
Red-whiskered bulbul

Order: Passeriformes Family: Pycnonotidae

Bulbuls are medium-sized songbirds. Some are colourful with yellow, red or orange vents, cheeks, throats or supercilia, but most are drab, with uniform olive-brown to black plumage.

- White-throated bulbul, venpuruva chinnaan
- Yellow-browed bulbul, manjal puruva chinnaan
- Black bulbul
- Square-tailed bulbul, karuppu chinnaan
- Grey-headed bulbul, sambalthaalai chinnaan
- Flame-throated bulbul
- White-browed bulbul, venpuruva chinnaan
- Yellow-throated bulbul, manjal thondai chinnaan
- Red-whiskered bulbul, sivappu meesai chinnaan
- Red-vented bulbul, chinnaan

== Swallows and martins ==
Order: Passeriformes Family: Hirundinidae

The family Hirundinidae is adapted to aerial feeding. They have a slender streamlined body, long pointed wings and a short bill with a wide gape. The feet are adapted to perching rather than walking, and the front toes are partially joined at the base.

- Sand martin
- Barn swallow, thagaivilaan
- Pacific swallow, nattu thagaivilaan
- Hill swallow
- Wire-tailed swallow, kambiwall thagaivilaan
- Eurasian crag martin
- Dusky crag martin, paarai thagaivilaan
- Common house martin
- Eastern red-rumped swallow, sivappu pitta thagaivilaan
- Streak-throated swallow, chinna thagaivilaan

== Leaf warblers and allies ==
Order: Passeriformes Family: Phylloscopidae

Leaf warblers are a family of small insectivorous birds found mostly in Eurasia and ranging into Wallacea and Africa. The species are of various sizes, often green-plumaged above and yellow below, or more subdued with greyish-green to greyish-brown colours.

- Hume's leaf warbler
- Yellow-browed warbler
- Tytler's leaf warbler
- Sulphur-bellied warbler
- Tickell's leaf warbler
- Dusky warbler
- Mountain chiffchaff
- Common chiffchaff
- Green warbler
- Greenish warbler, pachai kadhirkuruvi
- Large-billed leaf warbler
- Western crowned warbler

== Reed warblers, Grauer's warbler, and allies ==
Order: Passeriformes Family: Acrocephalidae

The members of this family are usually rather large for "warblers". Most are rather plain olivaceous brown above with much yellow to beige below. They are usually found in open woodland, reedbeds, or tall grass. The family occurs mostly in southern to western Eurasia and surroundings, but it also ranges far into the Pacific, with some species in Africa.

- Clamorous reed warbler, naanal kadhirkuruvi
- Paddyfield warbler, vayal kadhirkuruvi
- Blyth's reed warbler, blyth naanal kadhirkuruvi
- Thick-billed warbler
- Booted warbler, mara kadhirkuruvi
- Sykes's warbler, Sykes kadhirkuruvi

== Grassbirds and allies ==
Order: Passeriformes Family: Locustellidae

Locustellidae are a family of small insectivorous songbirds found mainly in Eurasia, Africa, and the Australian region. They are smallish birds with tails that are usually long and pointed, and tend to be drab brownish or buffy all over.

- Pallas's grasshopper warbler, Pallas's thathukili kadhirkuruvi
- Common grasshopper warbler, thathukili kadhirkuruvi
- Broad-tailed grassbird
- Bristled grassbird

== Cisticolas and allies ==
Order: Passeriformes Family: Cisticolidae

The Cisticolidae are warblers found mainly in warmer southern regions of the Old World. They are generally very small birds of drab brown or grey appearance found in open country such as grassland or scrub.

- Zitting cisticola, karungottu kadhirkuruvi
- Golden-headed cisticola, chenthalai kadhirkuruvi
- Grey-breasted prinia, velir sambal kadhirkuruvi
- Jungle prinia, kattu kadhirkuruvi
- Ashy prinia, saambal kadhirkuruvi
- Plain prinia, kadhirkuruvi
- Common tailorbird, fhaiyal chittu

== Sylviid babblers ==
Order: Passeriformes Family: Sylviidae

The family Sylviidae is a group of small insectivorous passerine birds. They mainly occur as breeding species, as the common name implies, in Europe, Asia and, to a lesser extent, Africa. Most are of generally undistinguished appearance, but many have distinctive songs.

- Lesser whitethroat
- Hume's whitethroat
- Eastern Orphean warbler

== Parrotbills and allies ==
Order: Passeriformes Family: Paradoxornithidae

The parrotbills are a group of peculiar birds native to East and Southeast Asia, though feral populations exist elsewhere. They are generally small, long-tailed birds which inhabit reedbeds and similar habitat. They feed mainly on seeds, e.g. of grasses, to which their bill, as the name implies, is well-adapted.

- Yellow-eyed babbler, manjalkan salamban

== White-eyes ==
Order: Passeriformes Family: Zosteropidae

The white-eyes are small and mostly undistinguished, their plumage above being generally some dull colour like greenish-olive, but some species have a white or bright yellow throat, breast or lower parts, and several have buff flanks. As their name suggests, many species have a white ring around each eye.

- Indian white-eye, vellai kanni

== Babblers and scimitar babblers ==
Order: Passeriformes Family: Timaliidae

The babblers, or timaliids, are somewhat diverse in size and colours, but are characterised by soft fluffy plumage.

- Tawny-bellied babbler, venthondai salamban
- Dark-fronted babbler, karunthalai salamban
- Pin-striped tit-babbler
- Indian scimitar babbler, valaindha alagu salamban

== Ground babblers ==
Order: Passeriformes Family: Pellorneidae

These small to medium-sized songbirds have soft fluffy plumage but are otherwise rather diverse. Members of the genus Illadopsis are found in forests, but some other genera are birds of scrublands

- Puff-throated babbler

== Alcippe fulvettas ==
Order: Passeriformes Family: Alcippeidae

The genus once included many other fulvettas and was previously placed in families Pellorneidae or Timaliidae.

- Brown-cheeked fulvetta, kalakalappan salamban

== Laughingthrushes and allies ==
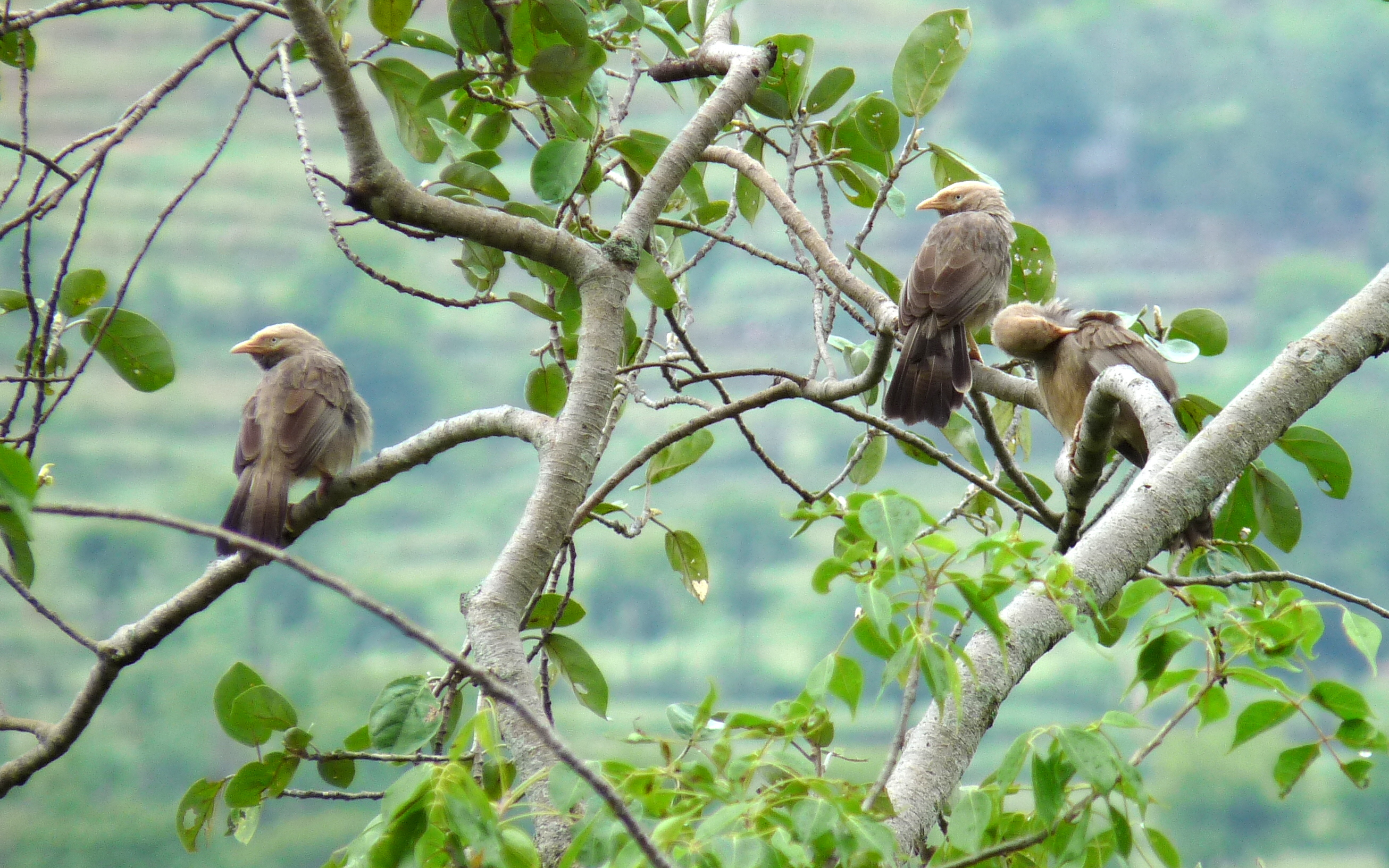
Yellow-billed babblers

Order: Passeriformes Family: Leiothrichidae

The members of this family are diverse in size and colouration, though those of genus Turdoides tend to be brown or greyish. The family is found in Africa, India, and southeast Asia.

- Nilgiri laughingthrush, nilagiri chirippan
- Palani laughingthrush
- Ashambu laughingthrush
- Large grey babbler, peria sambal salamban
- Rufous babbler, karunchivappu salamban
- Jungle babbler, kattu salamban
- Yellow-billed babbler, venthalai salamban
- Common babbler, thavittu salamban
- Wayanad laughingthrush, wayanattu chirippan

== Fairy-bluebirds ==
Order: Passeriformes Family: Irenidae

The fairy-bluebirds are bulbul-like birds of open forest or thorn scrub. The males are dark-blue and the females a duller green.

- Asian fairy bluebird, neelachittu

== Nuthatches ==
Order: Passeriformes Family: Sittidae

Nuthatches are small woodland birds. They have the unusual ability to climb down trees head first, unlike other birds which can only go upwards. Nuthatches have big heads, short tails and powerful bills and feet.

- Velvet-fronted nuthatch, velvet netri pasaiyeduppan
- Indian nuthatch
- Chestnut-bellied nuthatch, sembazhuppu vayitru pasaiyeduppan

== Treecreepers ==
Order: Passeriformes Family: Certhiidae

Treecreepers are small woodland birds, brown above and white below. They have thin pointed down-curved bills, which they use to extricate insects from bark. They have stiff tail feathers, like woodpeckers, which they use to support themselves on vertical trees.

- Indian spotted creeper

== Starlings and rhabdornis ==
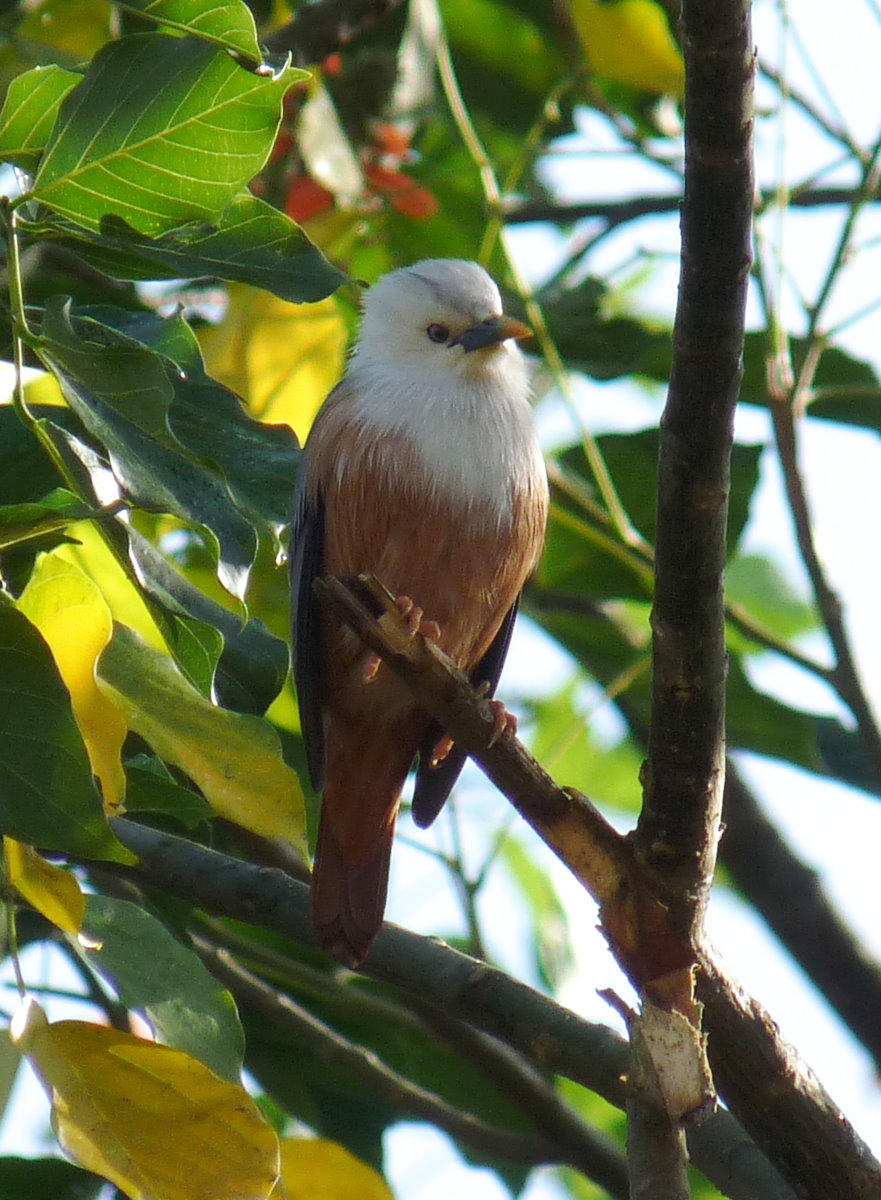
Chestnut-tailed starling

Order: Passeriformes Family: Sturnidae

Starlings are small to medium-sized passerine birds. Their flight is strong and direct and they are very gregarious. Their preferred habitat is fairly open country. They eat insects and fruit. Plumage is typically dark with a metallic sheen.

- Common hill myna
- Southern hill myna, மலை நாகணவாய்
- Jungle myna, காட்டு நாகணவாய்
- Bank myna
- Common myna, நாகணவாய்
- Indian pied myna
- Daurian starling
- Chestnut-tailed starling, சாம்பல் தலை நாகணவாய்
- Malabar starling
- Brahminy starling, கருங்கொண்டை நாகணவாய்
- Rosy starling, சோளக்குருவி

== Thrushes ==
Order: Passeriformes Family: Turdidae

The thrushes are a group of passerine birds that occur mainly in the Old World. They are plump, soft plumaged, small to medium-sized insectivores or sometimes omnivores, often feeding on the ground. Many have attractive songs.

- Pied thrush
- Orange-headed thrush, senthalai poong kuruvi
- Scaly thrush, nilagiri poong kuruvi
- Nilgiri thrush
- Tickell's thrush
- Indian blackbird
- Eyebrowed thrush

== Chats and Old World flycatchers ==
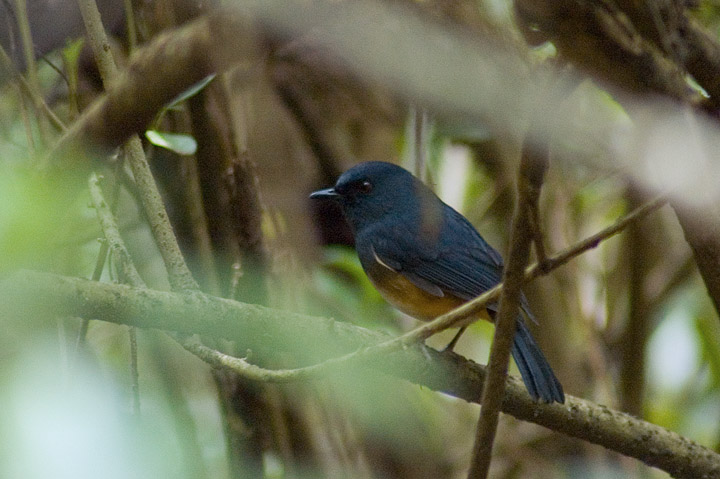
White-bellied blue robin

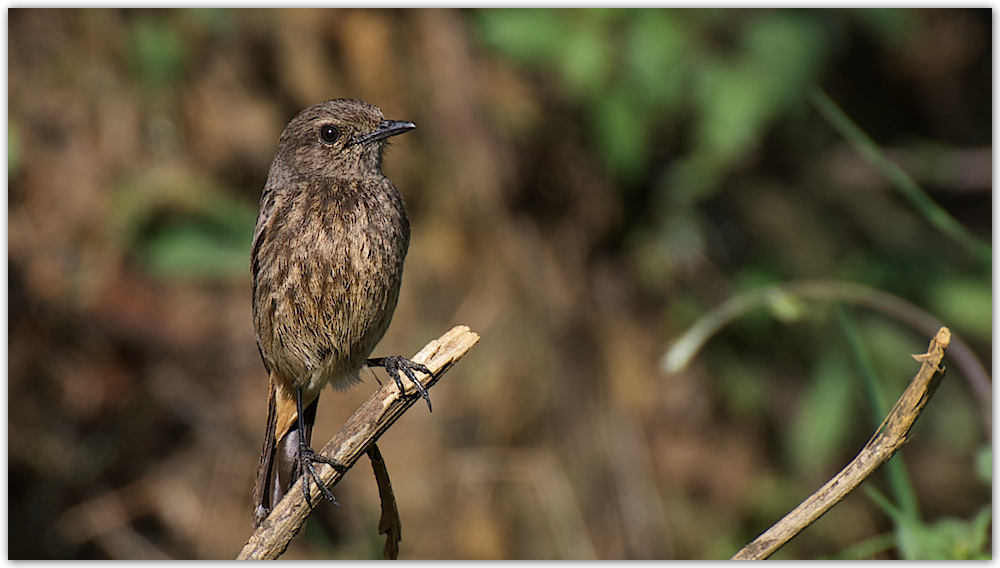
Pied bush chat

Order: Passeriformes Family: Muscicapidae

Chats and Old World flycatchers is a large group of small passerine birds native to the Old World. They are mainly small arboreal insectivores. The appearance of these birds is highly varied, but they mostly have weak songs and harsh calls.

- Indian robin, karunchittu
- Oriental magpie-robin, karuppu vellai kuruvi
- White-rumped shama, isaipaadum shama
- White-crowned shama
- Spotted flycatcher
- Dark-sided flycatcher
- Asian brown flycatcher
- Brown-breasted flycatcher, pazhuppu marbu eeppidippan
- White-bellied blue flycatcher, vellai vayitru neela eeppidippan
- Tickell's blue flycatcher, ticklell neela eeppidippan
- Blue-throated blue flycatcher
- Blue-and-white flycatcher (A)
- Verditer flycatcher
- Nilgiri flycatcher, nilagiri eeppidippan
- Indian blue robin
- Bluethroat, neelakantan
- Siberian rubythroat
- Nilgiri blue robin
- White-bellied blue robin
- Malabar whistling thrush, seegaar poong kuruvi
- Ultramarine flycatcher
- Rusty-tailed flycatcher
- Taiga flycatcher
- Red-breasted flycatcher (A)
- Kashmir flycatcher
- Black-and-orange flycatcher, karuppu orange eeppidippan
- Black redstart
- Blue rock thrush, neela poong kuruvi
- Blue-capped rock thrush, neelthalai poong kuruvi
- Siberian stonechat
- Pied bush chat
- Isabelline wheatear
- Desert wheatear

== Leafbirds ==
Order: Passeriformes Family: Chloropseidae

The leafbirds are small, bulbul-like birds. The males are brightly plumaged, usually in greens and yellows.

- Jerdon's leafbird
- Golden-fronted leafbird

== Flowerpeckers ==
Order: Passeriformes Family: Dicaeidae

The flowerpeckers are very small, stout, often brightly coloured birds, with short tails, short thick curved bills and tubular tongues.

- Thick-billed flowerpecker, parutha alagu malar kothi
- Pale-billed flowerpecker
- Nilgiri flowerpecker
- Plain flowerpecker

== Sunbirds ==
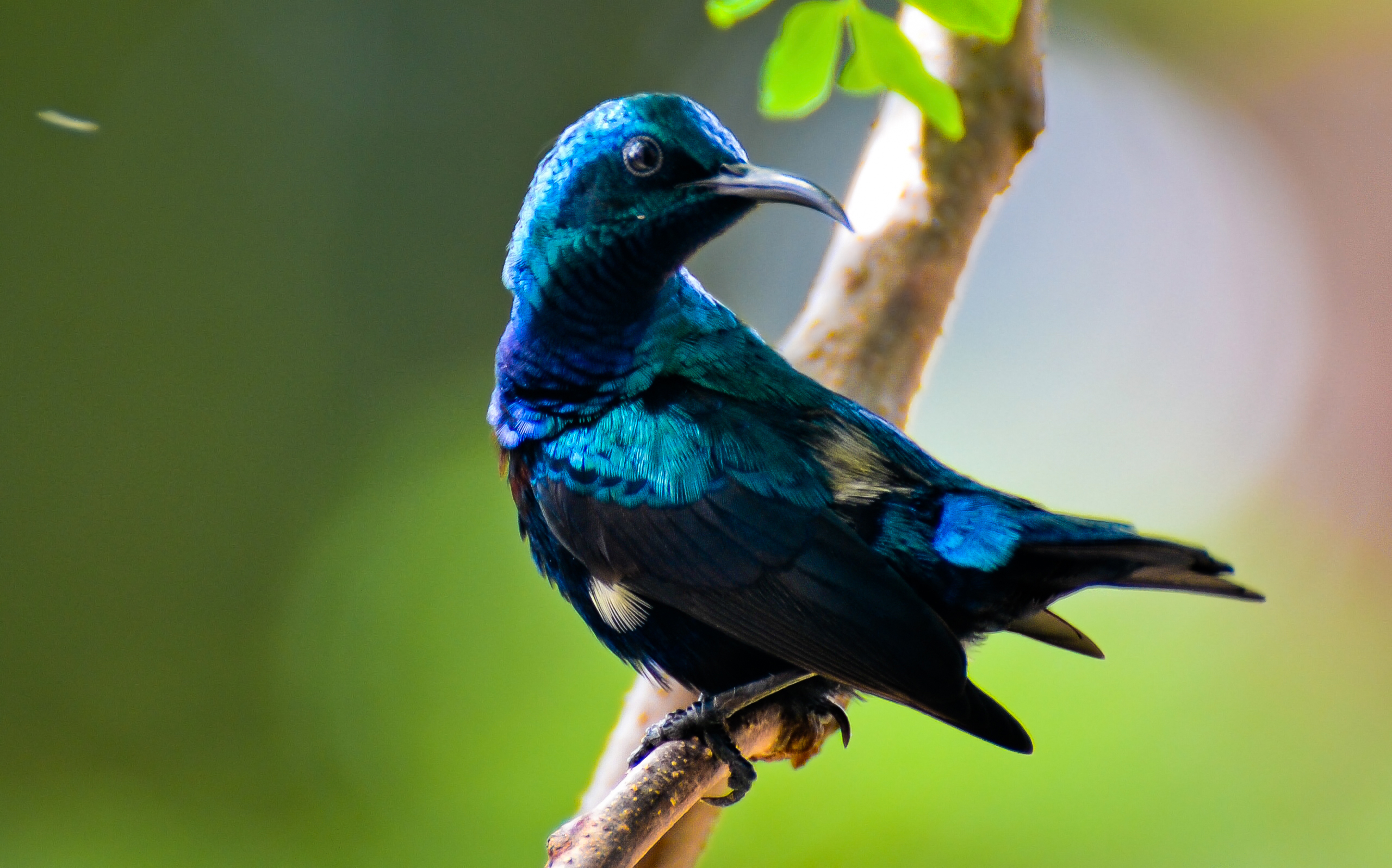
Purple sunbird

Order: Passeriformes Family: Nectariniidae

The sunbirds and spiderhunters are very small passerine birds which feed largely on nectar, although they will also take insects, especially when feeding young. Flight is fast and direct on their short wings. Most species can take nectar by hovering like a hummingbird, but usually perch to feed.

- Purple-rumped sunbird, oodha pitta thenchittu
- Crimson-backed sunbird
- Purple sunbird, oodha thenchittu
- Loten's sunbird, lotun thenchittu
- Little spiderhunter, chinna silanthi pidippan

== Old World sparrows and snowfinches ==
Order: Passeriformes Family: Passeridae

Sparrows are small passerine birds. In general, sparrows tend to be small, plump, brown or grey birds with short tails and short powerful beaks. Sparrows are seed eaters, but they also consume small insects.

- House sparrow, சிட்டுக்குருவி
- Yellow-throated sparrow, மஞ்சள் தொண்டைக் குருவி

== Weavers and widowbirds ==
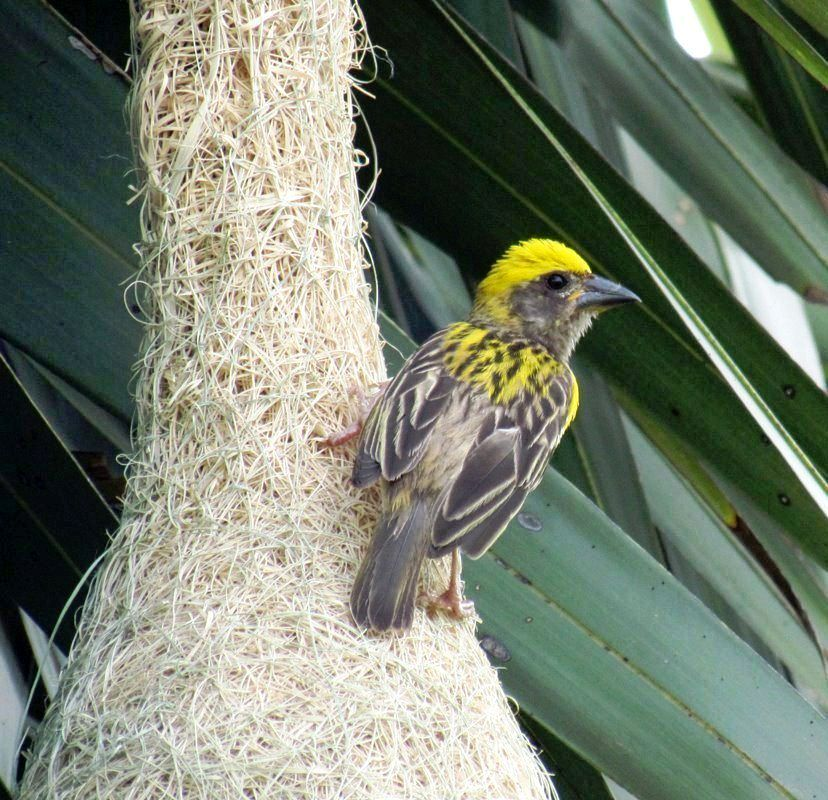
Baya weaver

Order: Passeriformes Family: Ploceidae

The weavers are small passerine birds related to the finches. They are seed-eating birds with rounded conical bills. The males of many species are brightly coloured, usually in red or yellow and black, some species show variation in colour only in the breeding season.

- Black-breasted weaver
- Streaked weaver, karungeetru thookkanam
- Baya weaver, tookanag kuruvi

== Waxbills, munias, and allies ==
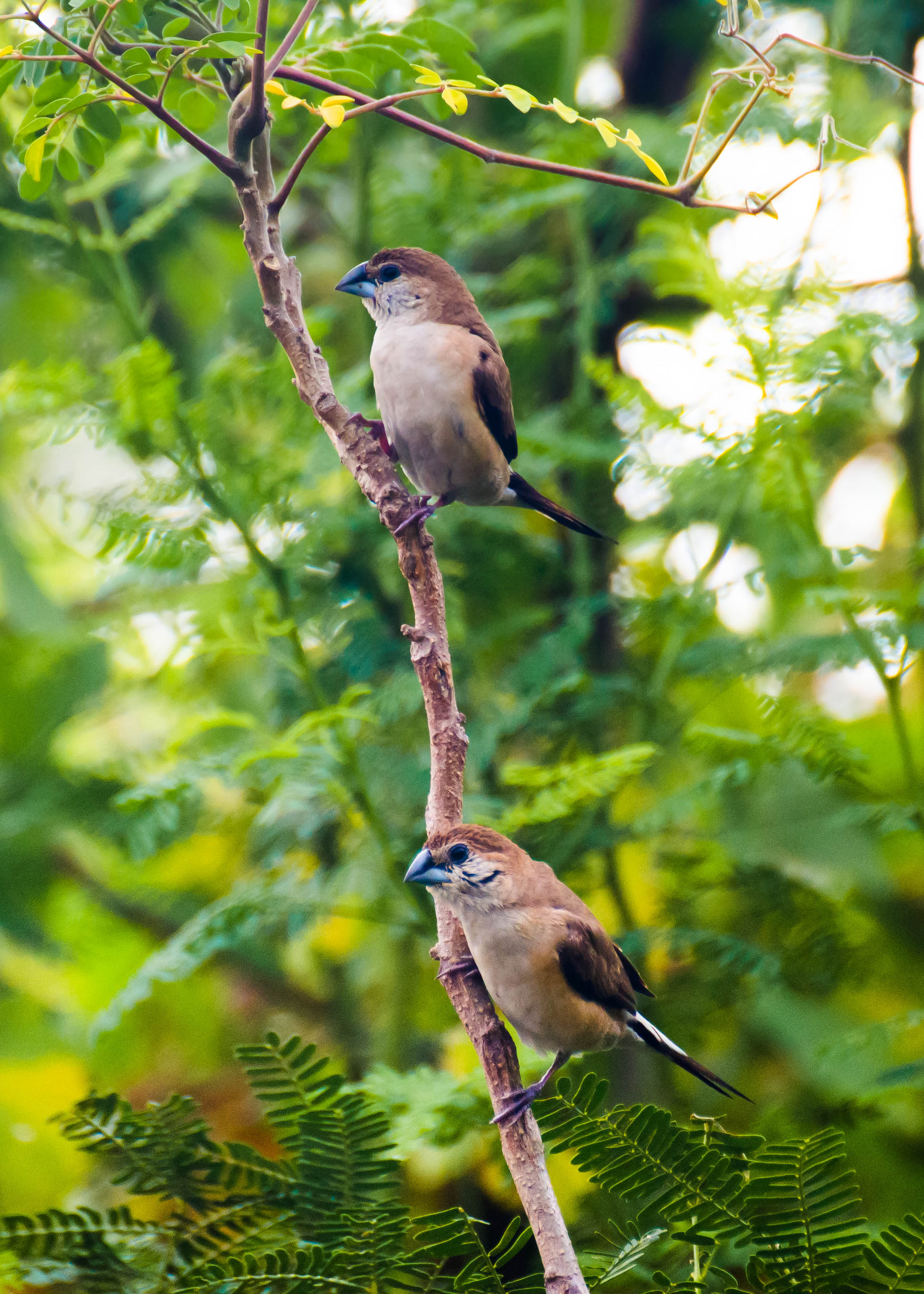
Indian silverbill

Order: Passeriformes Family: Estrildidae

The estrildid finches are small passerine birds of the Old World tropics and Australasia. They are gregarious and often colonial seed eaters with short thick but pointed bills. They are all similar in structure and habits, but have wide variation in plumage colours and patterns.

- Indian silverbill
- Scaly-breasted munia, புள்ளிச் சில்லை
- Black-throated munia, கருந்தொண்டை சில்லை
- White-rumped munia, வெண்முதுகு சில்லை
- Tricoloured munia, திணைக்குருவி
- Green avadavat
- Red avadavat

== Wagtails and pipits ==
Order: Passeriformes Family: Motacillidae

Motacillidae is a family of small passerine birds with medium to long tails. They include the wagtails, longclaws and pipits. They are slender, ground feeding insectivores of open country

- Forest wagtail, கொடிக்கால் வாலாட்டிக்குருவி
- Western yellow wagtail
- Citrine wagtail, மஞ்சள் தலை வாலாட்டிக்குருவி
- Grey wagtail, கரும் சாம்பல் வாலாட்டிக்குருவி
- White wagtail, வெள்ளை வாலாட்டிக்குருவி
- White-browed wagtail
- Richard's pipit, ரிச்சர்ட் நெட்டைக்காலி
- Paddyfield pipit, வயல் நெட்டைக்காலி
- Blyth's pipit
- Tawny pipit
- Long-billed pipit
- Tree pipit
- Olive-backed pipit
- Nilgiri pipit, நீலகிரி நெட்டைக்காலி

== Finches and euphonias ==
Order: Passeriformes Family: Fringillidae

Finches are seed-eating passerine birds, that are small to moderately large and have a strong beak, usually conical and in some species very large. All have twelve tail feathers and nine primaries. These birds have a bouncing flight with alternating bouts of flapping and gliding on closed wings, and most sing well.

- Common rosefinch, koombalagan

== Buntings ==
Order: Passeriformes Family: Emberizidae

The emberizids are a large family of passerine birds. They are seed-eating birds with distinctively shaped bills. In Europe, most species are called buntings. In North America, most of the species in this family are known as sparrows, but these birds are not closely related to the Old World sparrows which are in the family Passeridae. Many emberizid species have distinctive head patterns.

- Grey-necked bunting
- Black-headed bunting
- Red-headed bunting, kattu chenthalayan

== See also ==
- Wildlife of Tamil Nadu
- Birds of Coimbatore
- Lists of birds by region
