= Kumki (soundtrack) =

- CD cover

Soundtrack album by D. Imman
- Released: 1 August 2012
- Recorded: 2011–2012
- Genre: Feature film soundtrack
- Length: 41:18
- Language: Tamil
- Label: Sony Music India
- Producer: D. Imman

D. Imman chronology
Saattai (2012)	Kumki (2012)	Desingu Raja (2013)

Kumki is the soundtrack to the 2012 film of the same name directed by Prabhu Solomon, starring Vikram Prabhu (in his film debut) and Lakshmi Menon. The ten-song soundtrack consisted of seven musical numbers composed by D. Imman and written by Yugabharathi, and karaoke versions of three songs. Kumki is Imman's second collaboration with Solomon after Lee (2007) and Mynaa (2010).

The soundtrack which mostly consisted of folk and melody numbers, released at a launch event in Chennai on 1 August 2012, with the album being distributed by Sony Music India. It received generally positive critical response with praise directed towards its compositions and lyrics and fetched Imman his maiden Tamil Nadu State Film Award for Best Music Director and Filmfare Award for Best Music Director amongst other accolades.

== Background ==
Solomon and Imman considered the film's music to have a significant importance as it was a musical film, and they believed music would help in enriching the visuals and story. The director and with lyricist Yugabharathi met often at Imman's studio to discuss about the song situation and thereby work on the tunes and lyrics. Being reminiscent of the 1960s and 1970s where M. S. Viswanathan and Kannadasan would work on a song together, Imman added "today each is in a different place, one composes the tune and sends it and the other gives the words for it. The director could be in any corner of the globe listening in and giving the green signal. But for Kumki, the three of us were physically present at the studio to decide on the music."

The composing sessions were held at a stretch as Solomon would often meet Imman to discuss about ideas for a new song and would improvise any tunes and compositions. Imman had further experimented on variety of genres and instrumentations as the soundtrack encompasses folk and tribal music. For the song "Onnum Puriyala", the track was initially recorded with three singers, (Note: The name of the singer(s) were undisclosed by Solomon) but Solomon dissatisfied with the vocals zeroed on Imman after he hummed few lines of the track, which satisfied their expectations. For "Ayayayoo Aananthamey", Solomon initially wanted to bring two popular singers giving huge remuneration in advance and had recorded in Mumbai, but he was not satisfied as Solomon wanted the feel and expression of a mahout in the voice that should scream of jubilation and should not be digressed. Solomon then narrated the story to Haricharan, who was brought in for recording the track, and eventually sang the song like how a mahout would. Alphons Joseph sung the track "Nee Yeppo Pulla".

While most of the album consisted of melodic numbers, the film had two tracks "Yella Oorum"—a travel song and "Soi Soi"—a folk number, which were considered to be "racy". "Soi Soi", according to Imman, was in the same lines of "Jingi Jingi" from Mynaa. Imman used a pipe to reproduce the trumpeting of the elephants in particular intervals, as well as roping the Vedanthangal-based Buddhar kalaikuzhu troupe for performing local percussions. Magizhini Manimaaran, the troupe's founder was also introduced as the lead singer.

== Release ==
Kumki's soundtrack was distributed by Sony Music in digital and physical formats on 1 August 2012. The release coincided with an event held at Sathyam Cinemas in Chennai, where Rajinikanth, Kamal Haasan and Suriya, amongst other celebrities in the film's cast and crew, participated in the function. Kamal Haasan unveiled the audio CD and handed the first copy of the album to Rajinikanth and Suriya.

== Track listing ==
All lyrics are written by Yugabharathi.

No.	Title	Singer(s)	Length
1.	"Yella Oorum"	Benny Dayal, D. Imman	2:42
2.	"Onnum Puriyala"	D. Imman	4:19
3.	"Ayayayoo Aananthamey"	Haricharan	4:24
4.	"Sollitaley Ava Kaadhala"	K. G. Ranjith, Shreya Ghoshal	4:33
5.	"Soi Soi"	Magizhini Manimaaran	3:42
6.	"Nee Yeppo Pulla"	Alphons Joseph	4:00
7.	"A Lady and the Violin"	Aditi Paul, Karthik	4:17
8.	"Sollitaley Ava Kaadhala" (Karaoke)	Instrumental	4:33
9.	"Ayayayoo Aananthamey" (Karaoke)	Instrumental	4:24
10.	"Onnum Puriyala" (Karaoke)	Instrumental	4:19

== Reception ==
Karthik Srinivasan of Milliblog said that "Imman is firmly consolidating his form through Kumki". Vipin Nair of Music Aloud gave 7 out of 10 to the album and called it as an "impressive soundtrack" despite "couple of damp squibs". Malathi Rangarajan of The Hindu wrote "The songs are chartbusters and Imman must be a happy composer. His RR and the telling silences in between are worthy of appreciation." Pavithra Srinivasan of Rediff.com wrote "D Imman scores with melodious songs such as Onnum Puriyalai, Sollitaale Ava Kaadhala and Ayyayyyayo Anandhame, which work perfectly with the movie and linger on in memory." N. Venkateswaran of The Times of India wrote "After his good work in Prabu Solomon’s earlier hit Mynaa, Imman does one better in Kumki with one melody after another. Ayayyayyo Aanandame... (Haricharan) and Sollitaley Ava Kaadhala... (K J Ranjith and Shreya Ghoshal) are the pick of the lot, though the other songs also impress."

== Awards and nominations ==
Award (Note: Awards, festivals and organisations are in alphabetical order.)	Date of ceremony (Note: Date is linked to the article about the awards held that year, wherever possible.)	Category	Recipient(s) and nominee(s)	Result	Ref.
Ananda Vikatan Cinema Awards	16 January 2013	Best Music Director	D. Imman	Won	
Ananda Vikatan Cinema Awards	16 January 2013	Best Playback Singer – Female	Magizhini Manimaaran for "Soi Soi"	Won	
Ananda Vikatan Cinema Awards	16 January 2013	Best Lyricist	Yugabharathi	Won	
The Chennai Times Film Awards	4 November 2013	Best Music Director	D. Imman	Nominated	
The Chennai Times Film Awards	4 November 2013	Best Singer – Male	Haricharan for "Ayayayo Aananthamey"	Won	
The Chennai Times Film Awards	4 November 2013	Best Singer – Female	Magizhini Manimaaran for "Soi Soi"	Nominated	
Edison Awards	10 February 2013	Best Music Director	D. Imman	Won	
Edison Awards	10 February 2013	Best Folk Song	"Soi Soi"	Won	
Filmfare Awards South	20 July 2013	Best Music Director – Tamil	D. Imman	Won	
Filmfare Awards South	20 July 2013	Best Lyricist – Tamil	Yugabharathi for "Solitaley"	Won	
Filmfare Awards South	20 July 2013	Best Male Playback Singer – Tamil	D. Imman for "Onnum Puriyale"	Nominated	
Filmfare Awards South	20 July 2013	Best Female Playback Singer – Tamil	Shreya Ghoshal for "Solitaley"	Nominated	
Mirchi Music Awards South	26 August 2013	Song of the Year	"Ayayayo Aananthamey"	Won	
Mirchi Music Awards South	26 August 2013	Song of the Year	"Solitaley"	Nominated	
Mirchi Music Awards South	26 August 2013	Album of the Year	D. Imman	Won	
Mirchi Music Awards South	26 August 2013	Male Vocalist of the Year	Haricharan for "Ayayayo Aananthamey"	Nominated	
Mirchi Music Awards South	26 August 2013	Music Composer of the Year	D. Imman for "A Lady and the Violin"	Nominated	
Mirchi Music Awards South	26 August 2013	Music Composer of the Year	D. Imman for "Solitaley"	Won	
Mirchi Music Awards South	26 August 2013	Lyricist of the Year	Yugabharathi for "Ayayayo Aananthamey"	Nominated	
Mirchi Music Awards South	26 August 2013	Upcoming Female Vocalist of the Year	Magizhini Manimaaran for "Soi Soi"	Nominated	
Mirchi Music Awards South	26 August 2013	Mannin Kural Male Vocalist of the Year	Alphons Joseph for "Nee Yeppo Pulla"	Nominated	
Mirchi Music Awards South	26 August 2013	Mannin Kural Female Vocalist of the Year	Magizhini Manimaaran for "Soi Soi"	Won	
Mirchi Music Awards South	26 August 2013	Song of the Year – Listener's choice	"Solitaley"	Won	
Mirchi Music Awards South	26 August 2013	Technical – Sound Mixing of the Year	"Yella Oorum"	Nominated	
Norway Tamil Film Festival Awards	24–28 April 2013	Best Music Director	D. Imman	Won	
South Indian International Movie Awards	12–13 September 2013	Best Music Director – Tamil	D. Imman	Nominated	
South Indian International Movie Awards	12–13 September 2013	Best Lyricist – Tamil	Yugabharathi for "Solitaley"	Nominated	
South Indian International Movie Awards	12–13 September 2013	Best Male Playback Singer – Tamil	Haricharan for "Ayayayo Aananthamey"	Nominated	
South Indian International Movie Awards	12–13 September 2013	Best Female Playback Singer – Tamil	Shreya Ghoshal for "Solitaley"	Nominated	
South Indian International Movie Awards	12–13 September 2013	Best Dance Choreographer – Tamil	Noble for "Ayyayayo Aananthamey"	Nominated	
Tamil Nadu State Film Awards	13 July 2017	Best Music Director	D. Imman	Won	
Tamil Nadu State Film Awards	13 July 2017	Best Male Playback Singer	Ranjith for "Solitaley"	Won	
Tamil Nadu State Film Awards	13 July 2017	Best Female Playback Singer	Shreya Ghoshal for "Solitaley"	Won	
Vijay Awards	11 May 2013	Best Music Director	D. Imman	Won	
Vijay Awards	11 May 2013	Best Male Playback Singer	Haricharan for "Ayayayo Aananthamey"	Nominated	
Vijay Awards	11 May 2013	Best Lyricist	Yugabharathi for "Solitaley"	Nominated	
Vijay Awards	11 May 2013	Favourite Song	"Solitaley"	Nominated	

== Other versions ==
The song "Soi Soi" was reused in the Marathi film Carry On Maratha (2015) as "Yuvarani (Soi Soi)", with new lyrics by Kashmira Kulkarni.
