= Kumki =

Kumki may refer to:

- Kumki, Arunachal Pradesh, a town in Arunachal Pradesh state of India
- Kumki, Poland
- Kumki (elephant), an elephant used as an aid in capturing a wild elephant
- Kumki (film), a 2012 Indian Tamil-language film
  - Kumki (soundtrack), of the 2012 film
- Kumki 2, a 2025 sequel to the 2012 film
