= Ousteri Lake =

Lake in Puducherry, India

- French: Lac Oustéri
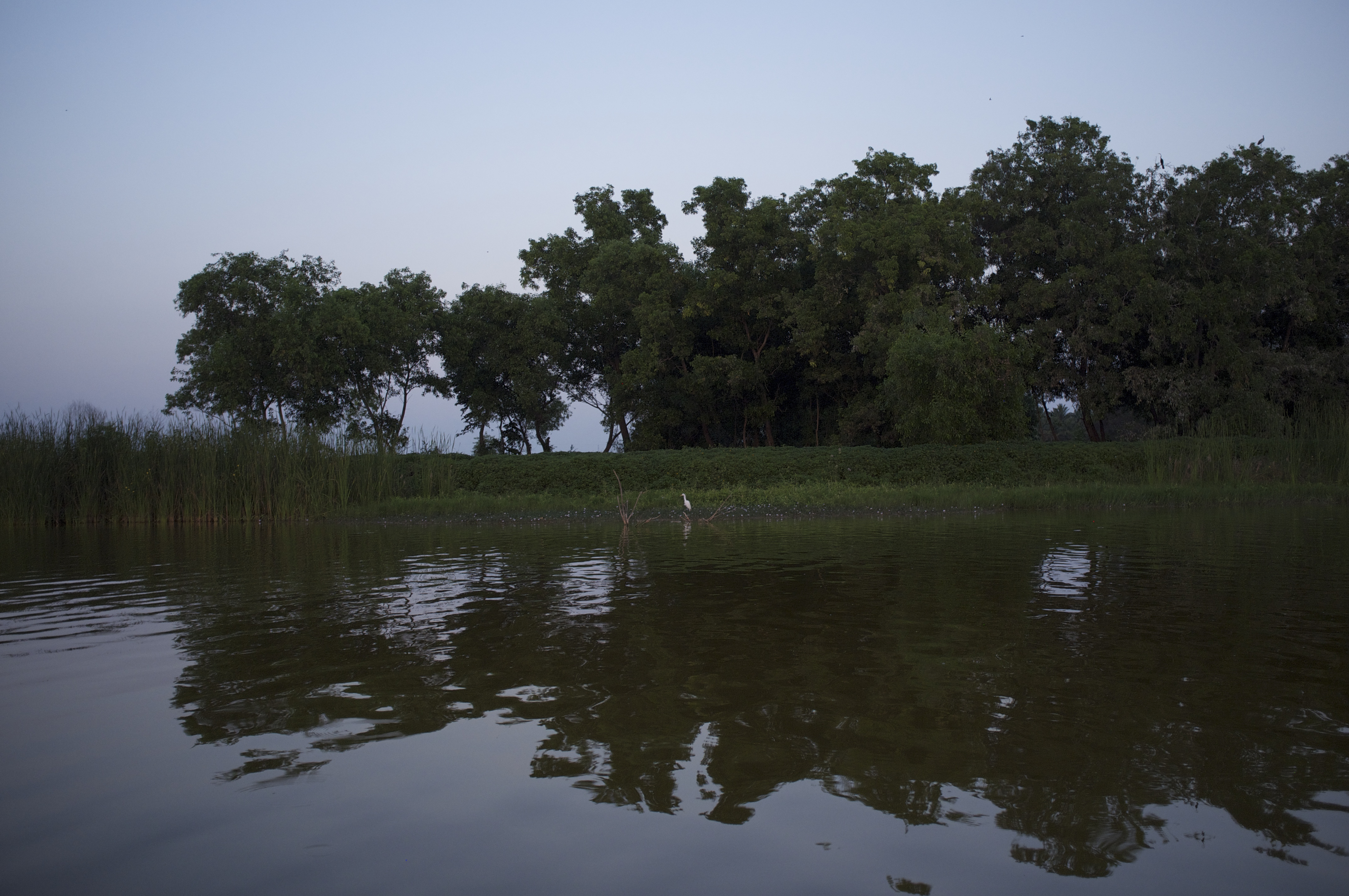
- Ousteri Lake

- Location within India
- Location: Puducherry, India
- Coordinates: 11.955°N 79.745°E
- Type: lake

Ousteri Lake (French: Lac Oustéri) is a lake shared between the union territory of Puducherry, and the state of Tamil Nadu. The spatial extend of the lake is almost equal in between the two states, and it is one of the largest tanks in the Puducherry region. This lake is also called as Ossudu Lake as it is located in the village named Ossudu.

The lake extends to about 800 hectares in which 390 hectares lies in Puducherry and the rest in Tamil Nadu. It is the largest lake of Puducherry.

== Traditional water management ==
The rural landscapes of Tamil Nadu host a unique network of artificial wetlands, historically constructed as cascading tank systems to capture and store rainfall for agricultural use. These engineered wetlands form a culturally and ecologically significant water management heritage that has sustained regional agriculture for centuries.

== Bird sanctuary ==
Ousteri Lake is a man-made lake, which is considered as one of the important wetlands in Asia. Different species of migratory birds reside in this lake throughout the year, for which the lake gains significance from the IBA (Important Bird Areas). In 2008 Ousteri wetlands in Puducherry was declared as a bird sanctuary-Oussudu Bird Sanctuary, while the wetlands in Tamil Nadu was declared in 2015.

== Tourism ==
The lake is one of the prominent tourist spot in Puducherry. The Puducherry Tourism Department Corporation has made a small boat club on the lake for tourists. The Puducherry government is proposing to make Ousteri as a National park. It also has proposed to set up telescopes to watch the birds and make the region as an eco-tourism destination.

Oussudu Lake has undergone a major socio-ecological transition in recent decades, shifting from a traditional irrigation tank serving agricultural communities to a site managed primarily for biodiversity conservation and recreation. Research conducted by the French Institute of Pondicherry employed a social-ecological systems framework to reconstruct the historical trajectory of the lake and analyse interdependencies among its ecological, social, and governance components. The study found that governance changes contributed to effectively 'black boxing' the wetland's functional ecological relationships, concealing major water resource issues at both regional and local scales. Tamil Nadu, the broader context of Pondicherry, is the third most urbanised state in India with approximately 35 million urban residents representing 48% of the state's population, creating intense pressure on the region's wetland systems.
