= Oussudu Bird Sanctuary =

Protected area in Puducherry, India

Oussudu Bird Sanctuary Sanctuaire d'Oiseaux d'Ousteri
- IUCN category IV (habitat/species management area)
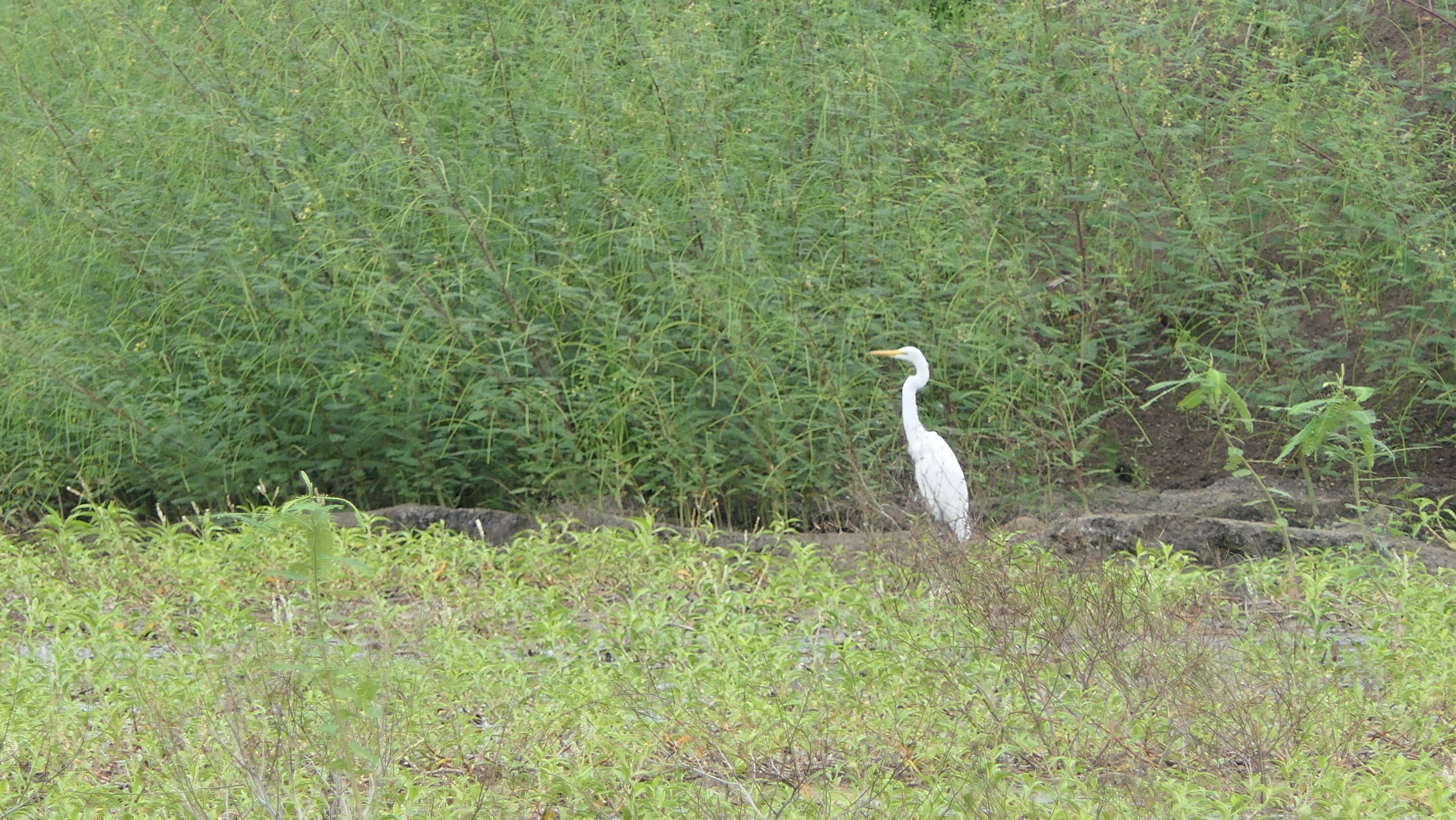
- Great egret in the Sanctuary
- Interactive map of Oussudu Bird Sanctuary; Sanctuaire d'Oiseaux d'Ousteri
- Location: Puducherry, India
- Area: 3.9
- Established: 2008

Oussudu or Ousteri Bird Sanctuary (French: Réserve Ornithologique d'Oussudu) is the first and the only wildlife sanctuary in the Indian union territory of Puducherry. It was created in 2008. It spans over 390 acres around the Ousteri lake.

== Flora and fauna ==
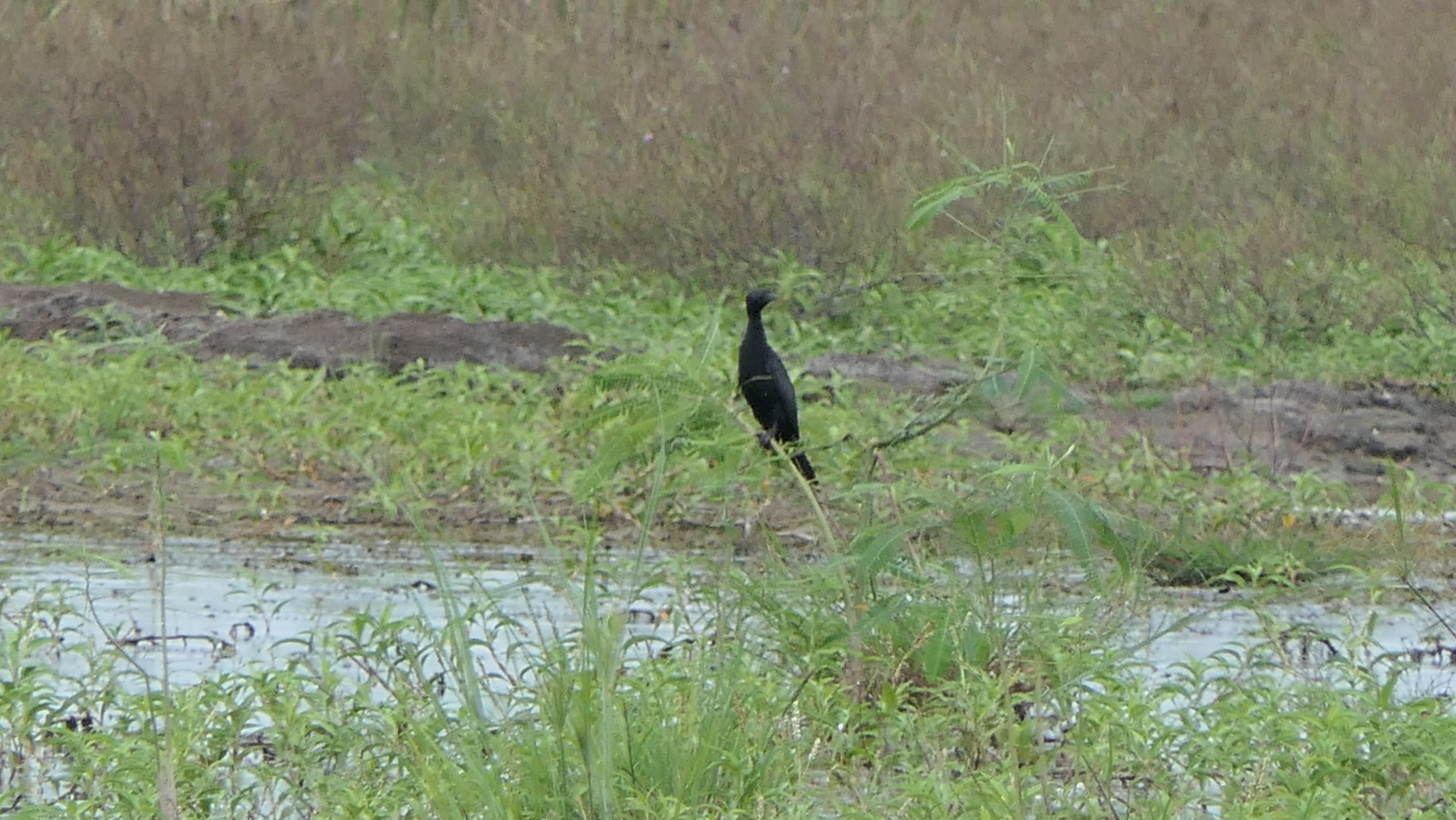
Little cormorant in the sanctuary

The lake is home to around 200 species of birds. About 40 species of migratory birds visit the sanctuary after November everyear including golden oriole, openbill stork, tailor bird, painted stork, white ibis, white-breasted water-hen and spotted owlets. The vegetation ranges from small herbs to trees, which supports migratory avifauna as well as native birds during summer and winter.

However, bird poaching poses a significant threat to the sanctuary. In 2022, the Wildlife Department in Puducherry (Direction des Forêts et de la Faune de Pondichéry) seized 57 bird carcasses, which had been poisoned and killed by poachers.
