= Magizhini Manimaaran =

Magizhini Manimaaran மகிழினி மணிமாறன்
- Born: Magizhini Manimaaran
- Occupation: Singer
- Years active: 2012–present

Magizhini Manimaaran (Tamil: மகிழினி மணிமாறன்) is an Indian folk and playback singer in the Tamil film industry who got a break as a playback singer in the film Kumki.

== Personal life and early career ==
Born in Malaipuram in Kanchipuram district, Maghizhini's parents were farmers. She became a member of the Buddhar kalaikuzhu folk troupe, where she became a ‘parai’ drummer and met her husband Manimaaran.

== Discography ==
| Year | Film | Language | Song |
|---|---|---|---|
| 2012 | kumki | Tamil | Soi Soi |
| 2014 | Kaadu | Tamil | Ucchi Malai Kadu |
| 2014 | Eppothum Vendraan | Tamil | Ethana Murai |
| 2014 | Veeram | Tamil | Jing Chikka Jing Chikka |
| 2015 | S/O Satyamurthy | Telugu | "Super Machi" |
| 2015 | Soorathengai | Tamil | Otha Paarvai Parthu |
| 2016 | Maari | Tamil | Thappa Dhaan Theriyum |
| 2017 | Arasakulam | Tamil | Valarum Kodi Valara |

== Accolades ==
| Year | Award | Category | Film | Song | Result | Ref. |
|---|---|---|---|---|---|---|
| 2013 | Ananda Vikatan Cinema Awards | Best Playback Singer – Female | kumki | Soi Soi | Won | |
| 2013 | Edison Awards | Best Folk Song | kumki | Soi Soi | Won | |
| 2013 | Mirchi Music Awards South | Mannin Kural Female Vocalist of the Year | kumki | Soi Soi | Won | |
| 2013 | The Chennai Times Film Awards | Best Singer – Female | kumki | Soi Soi | Nominated | |
