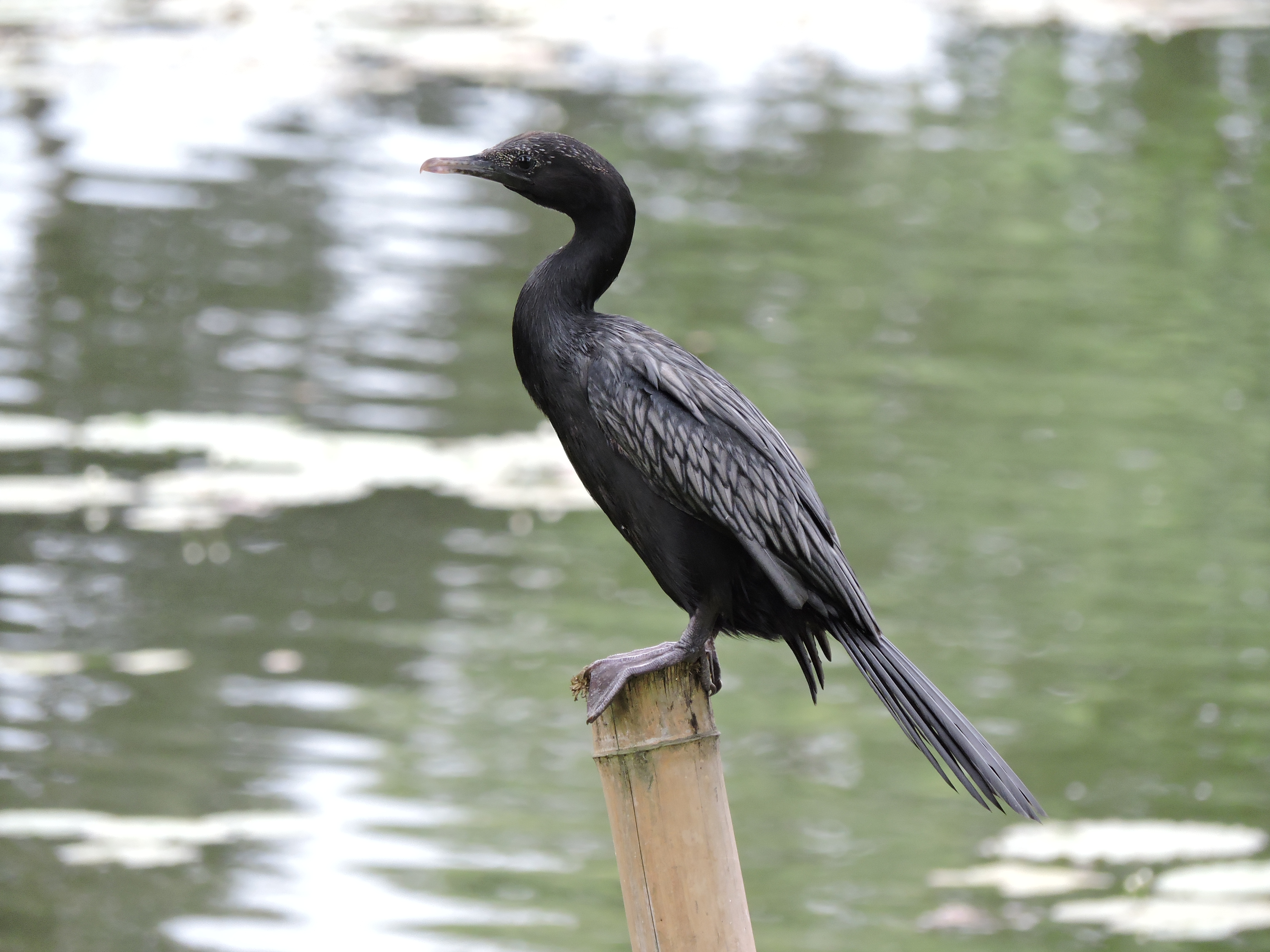

Conservation status
- Least Concern (IUCN 3.1)

Scientific classification
- Kingdom: Animalia
- Phylum: Chordata
- Class: Aves
- Order: Suliformes
- Family: Phalacrocoracidae
- Genus: Microcarbo
- Species: M. niger

Binomial name
- Microcarbo niger (Vieillot, 1817)

Synonyms
- Halietor niger Phalacrocorax niger Phalacrocorax javanicus

= Little cormorant =

Species of bird

The little cormorant (Microcarbo niger) is a member of the cormorant family of seabirds. Slightly smaller than the Indian cormorant it lacks a peaked head and has a shorter beak. It is widely distributed across the Indian subcontinent and extends east to Java, where it is sometimes called the Javanese cormorant. It forages singly or sometimes in loose groups in lowland freshwater bodies, including small ponds, large lakes, streams and sometimes coastal estuaries. Like other cormorants, it is often found perched on a waterside rock with its wings spread out after coming out of the water. The entire body is black in the breeding season but the plumage is brownish, and the throat has a small whitish patch in the non-breeding season. These birds breed gregariously in trees, often joining other waterbirds at heronries.

== Description ==
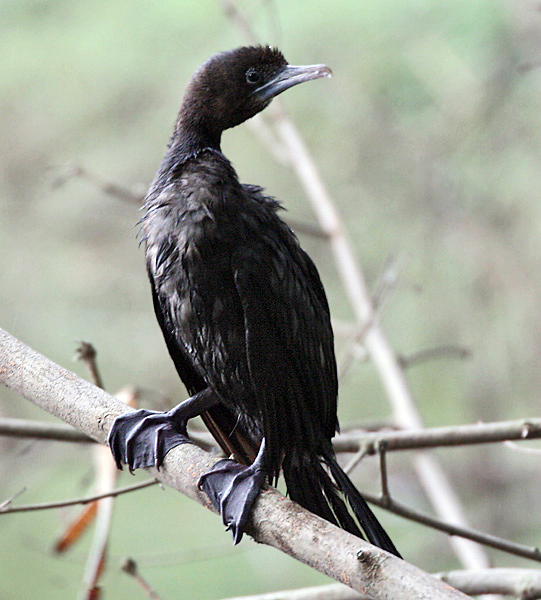
Breeding plumage (Kolkata, India)

Measurements

India
Length	♂	420–455 mm (16.5–17.9 in)
	♀	415–435 mm (16.3–17.1 in)
Tail	♂	137–150 mm (5.4–5.9 in)
	♀	125–140 mm (4.9–5.5 in)
Head	♂	79–82 mm (3.1–3.2 in)
	♀	76–77 mm (3.0–3.0 in)

The little cormorant is about 50 centimetres (20 in) long and only slightly smaller than the Indian cormorant (Phalacrocorax fuscicollis). The Indian cormorant has a narrower and longer bill which ends in a prominent hook tip, blue iris and a more pointed head profile. The breeding adult bird has a glistening all black plumage with some white spots and filoplumes on the face. There is also a short crest on the back of the head. The eyes, gular skin and face are dark. In the non-breeding bird or juvenile, the plumage is brownish and the bill and gular skin can appear more fleshy. The crest becomes inconspicuous and a small and well-marked white patch on the throat is sometimes visible. Towards the west of the Indus River valley, its range can overlap with vagrant pygmy cormorants (Microcarbo pygmaeus), which can be difficult to differentiate in the field and are sometimes even considered conspecific. The sexes are indistinguishable in the field, but males tend to be larger. Some abnormal silvery-grey plumages have been described.

The species was described by Vieillot in 1817 as Hydrocorax niger. The genus Hydrocorax literally means water crow. It was later included with the other cormorants in the genus Phalacrocorax but some studies place the smaller "microcormorants" under the genus Microcarbo.

== Distribution ==
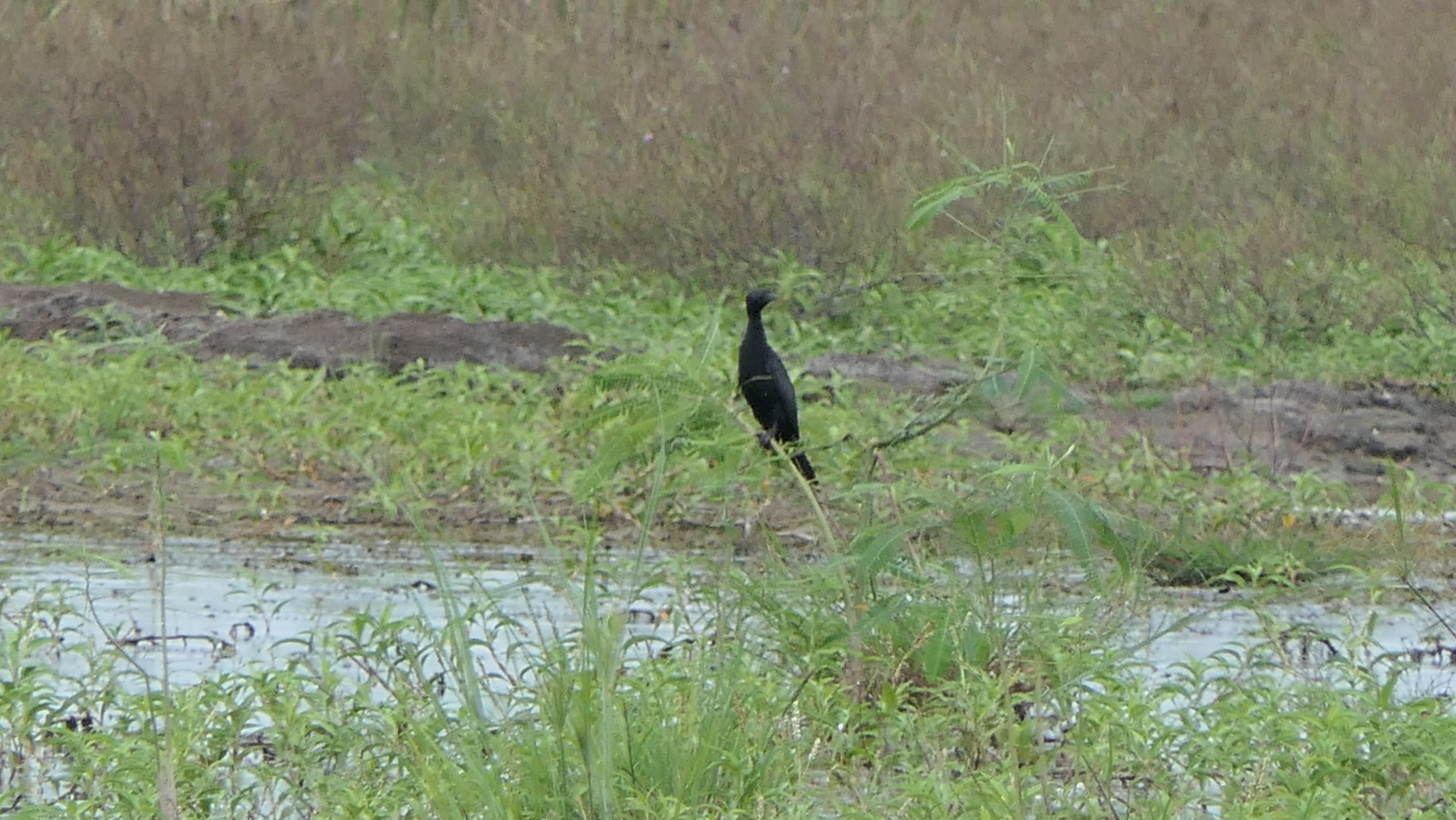
Little cormorant in the Oussudu Bird Sanctuary

The little cormorant is found across India, Sri Lanka, Bangladesh, Pakistan and lowland Nepal. It is also found in parts of Myanmar, Thailand, Laos, Cambodia and Indonesia. It is not found in the Himalayas, but vagrants have been seen in Ladakh. It inhabits wetlands, ranging from small village ponds to large lakes, and sometimes tidal estuaries.

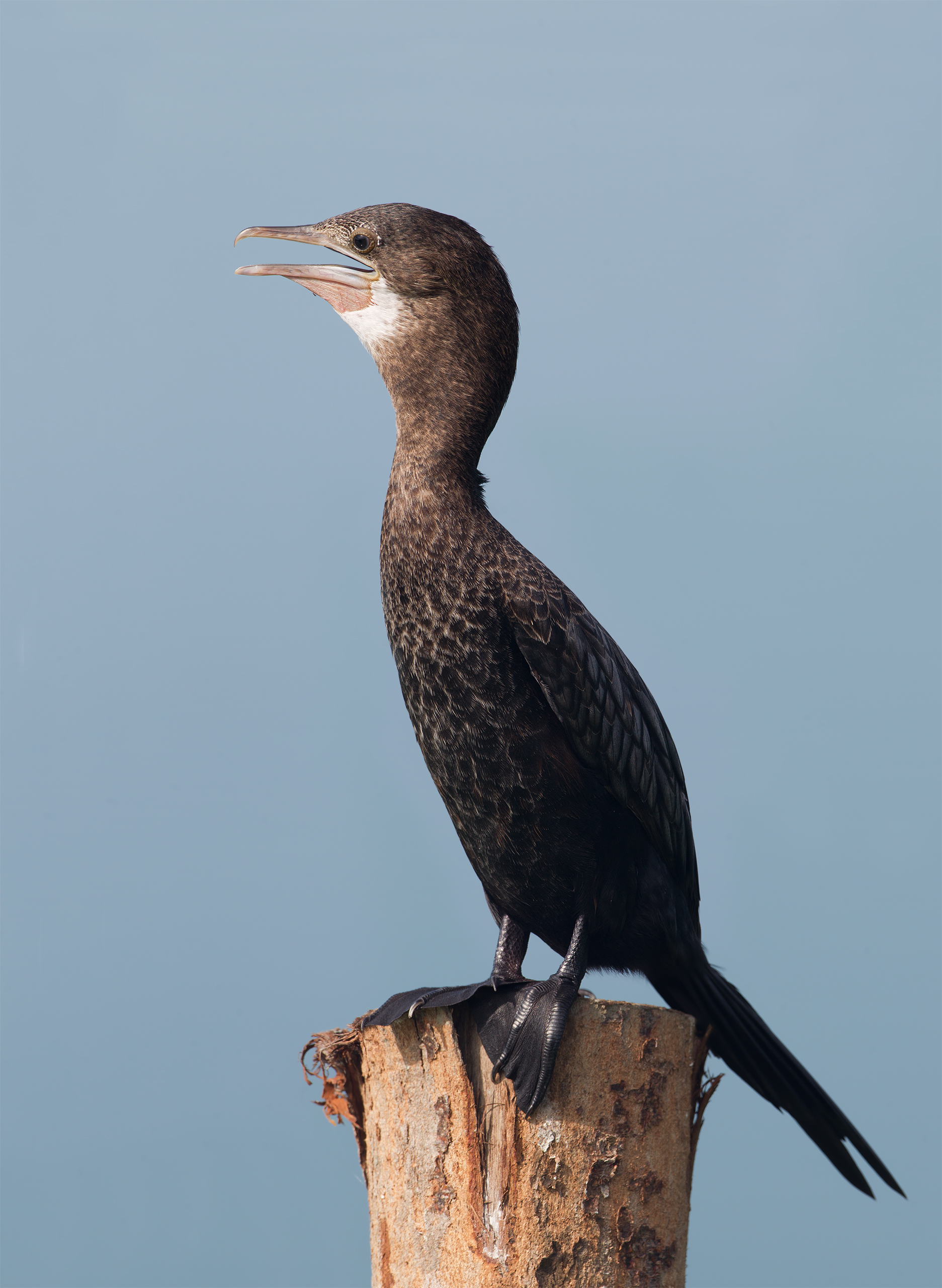
In non-breeding plumage. Note whitish throat patch and brownish plumage.

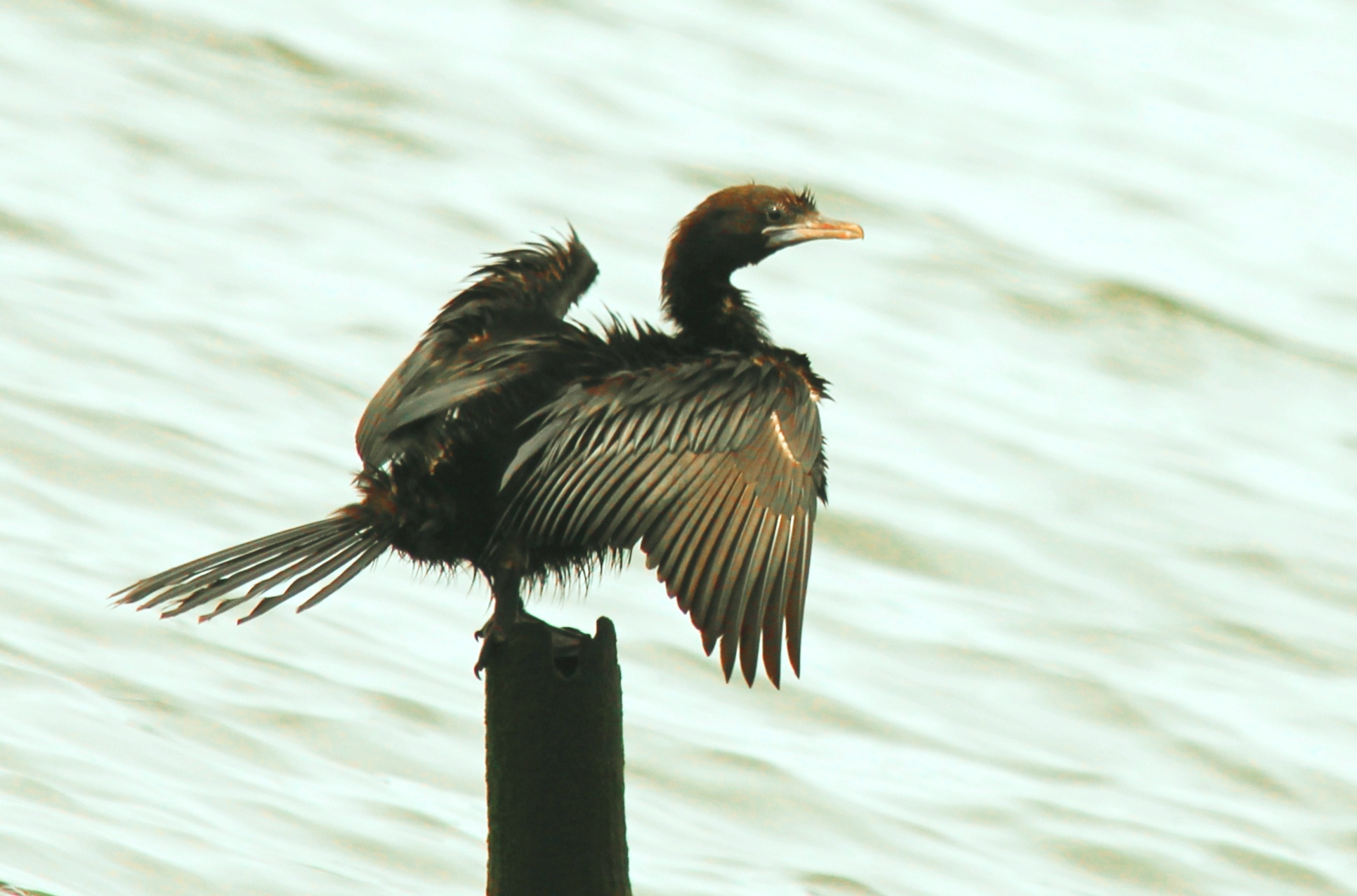
In the inland waters of Western Ghats, Southern India

== Behaviour and ecology ==
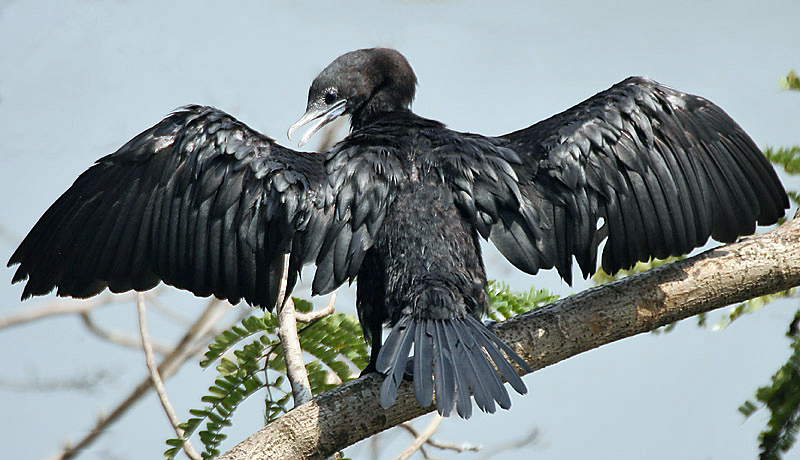
Wing-spreading (Kolkata, India)

Little cormorants tend to forage mainly in small loose groups and are often seen foraging alone. They swim underwater to capture their prey, mainly fish. A study in northern India found that the little cormorant fished in water which was less than a metre deep and captured fishes of about 2–8 centimetres (0.79–3.15 in) length. They propel themselves underwater using their webbed feet. Captured fishes are often brought up to the surface to swallow them and during this time other birds including other little cormorants, painted storks, gulls and egrets may attempt to steal them. Indian cormorants tend to fish communally in larger groups. Like all other cormorants, they will emerge from water and will hold out their wings and stay immobile for a while. The behaviour has been suggested to be for wing-drying, but this interpretation is debated. A study in Sri Lanka found that the time spent with spread wings was always after they had spent some time underwater, and that the duration was related to time spent underwater and inversely related to the temperature and dryness of air. These observations support the theory that the studied behaviour aids drying of the wings.

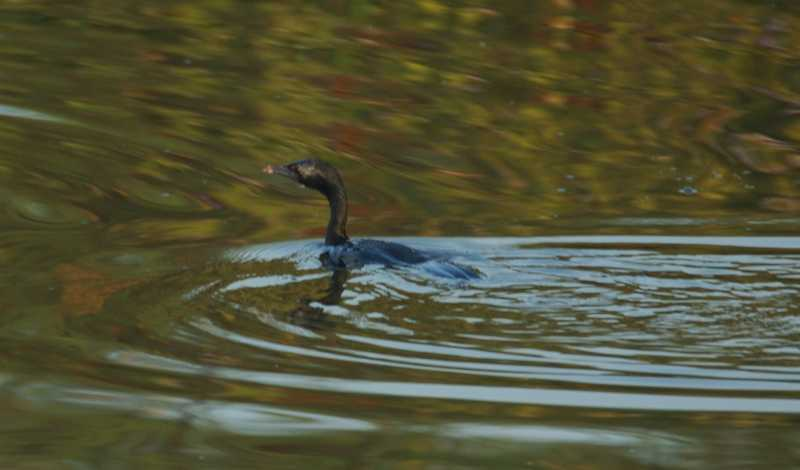
Swimming

The breeding season of the little cormorant is between July and September in Pakistan and northern India and between November and February in southern India. In Sri Lanka it is December to May. A study in Bangladesh found them to breed from May to October. Males display at the nest site by fluttering their wings while holding their head back and bill raised. They then lower the bill, and after pairing the male also provides food to the female in courtship feeding. Both parents take part in building the nest, which is a platform of sticks placed on trees and sometimes even on coconut palms. They may nest beside Indian pond herons and little egrets in colonies. The nest is built in about two weeks. The whitish eggs turn muddy with age and incubation begins when the first egg is laid. This leads to asynchronous hatching and the chicks in a nest can vary considerably in age. The clutch size can vary from two to six eggs laid at intervals of about two days. The eggs hatch after 15 to 21 days. The downy chicks have a bare red head. The young birds are able to leave the nest after about a month.

Little cormorants are vocal near their nest and roosts where they produce low roaring sounds. They also produce grunts and groans, a low pitched ah-ah-ah and kok-kok-kok calls. They roost communally often in the company of other waterbirds.

Parasitic bird lice, Pectinopygus makundi, have been described from little cormorant hosts. Endoparasitic helminths, Hymenolepis childi and Dilepis lepidocolpos have been described from Sri Lankan birds while others like Neocotylotretus udaipurensis and Syncuaria buckleyi have been described from Indian birds.

== Other sources ==
- Chozhiyattel, Zeenath (2009) Behaviour and adaptations of little cormorant Phalacrocorax niger and Darter Anhinga melanogaster. Ph.D. thesis. University of Calicut.
- Sarker, N. J. Naher, H. (2002). Experimental studies on food habits of the little cormorant, Phalacrocorax Niger (Vieillot). Bangladesh Journal of Zoology. 30(2):173–182.
- Purandare, Kiran (2001). Nesting colonies of the Little Cormorant (Phalacrocorax niger) and Night Heron (Nycticorax nycticorax) in Pune city, Maharashtra. Newsletter for Birdwatchers . 41(1):9.
- Patnaik, AK; Samanta, M; Prasad, R (1981): Chromosome complement and banding patterns in a Pelecaniform bird, Phalacrocorax niger. Journal Hered. 72(6):447–449.
- Siriwannichkul, O. (1981). Food Habits and Breeding Biology of Little Cormorant (Phalacrocorax Niger). Kasetsart Univ. Bangkok. Thailand, 68pp.
