= Buddhar kalaikuzhu =

Buddhar Kalaikuzhu
- Origin: Vedanthangal, Tamil Nadu, India
- Genres: Tamil Folk
- Years active: 2007–Present

Buddhar Kalaikuzhu is a folk music and dance troupe operating in Tamil Nadu. The troupe, founded by Mr. Manimaran Magizhini in 2007, specializes in one of the Tamil's oldest folk art, Parai Aattam (Parai Music & Dance)and other folk art forms. The troupe has a few full-time artistes and many part-time artistes. The troupe has a mix of men and women.

== Vision & Mission ==
The troupe's primary mission is to spread the folk-art (Parai Aattam) across the world and make the same attain a respectable spot among other forms of art.

== Performances ==
The troupe's flagship performance is the Parai Aattam. The troupe is also proficient in other folk art forms like Oyil Aattam, Peria Kuchi Aattam, Sila, Kazhiyalattam and Bommaiyattam

In principle, Buddhar Kalaikuzhu performs Parai Aattam to signify and celebrate life but not death. Hence, Parai Aattam is performed by the troupe's artistes on stages in uniforms, for occasions such as birth, puberty, engagement, marriages.

Buddhar Kalaikuzhu does not perform for funerals for various reasons. As Mr.Manimaran explains "Performing at funerals would mean that we cannot wear uniforms/anklets nor can we express ourselves. Moreover, the women performers are not allowed in cremation grounds. It is also unfair to negotiate wages during that time". Artistes in Buddhar Kalaikuzhu do not touch the Parai with alcohol in their blood. So far, Buddhar Kalaikuzhu has performed across India in Tamil Nadu, Karnataka, Andhra Pradesh, Bihar and West Bengal.

Apart from the 'on invitation' performances, Buddhar Kalaikuzhu routinely participates in and for social causes.

== Spreading Parai ==
Sensing that the Parai art form is on the decline, Buddhar Kalaikuzhu is striving to find Parai a better place. Apart from holding lectures and demonstrations in colleges & schools, Buddhar Kalaikuzhu is running a few training programs to learn Parai through its Parai Training School.

Every year, a three-day training camp is held in Vedanthangal and Chennai during the months of May and December. The participants in the camp learn the basics of Parai at a very nominal cost inclusive of food and accommodation.
Buddhar Kalaikuzhu also conducts a one-year certificate course on Parai Aattam in Chennai. The participants are taken through the different stages of Parai music and dance. They also get to learn the history of Parai and are encouraged to contribute to the betterment of Parai. Buddhar Kalaikuzhu's Parai school is the first to introduce a written examination as part of their Parai certificate course, apart from the other routine practical tests.

== Awards and Recognitions ==
In 2012, Buddhar Kalaikuzhu was featured in Vikatan TV
In 2014, the troupe was chosen as the Best Art Troupe for People (சிறந்த மக்கள் கலைக்குழு) by Kalagam. Same year, Mr. Manimaran Magizhini, troupe's founder and co-ordinator, received the prestigious Puthiya Thalaimurai's Tamizhan Award.
