= Vedanthangal Bird Sanctuary =

Protected area in Tamil Nadu, India

- IUCN category IV (habitat/species management area)
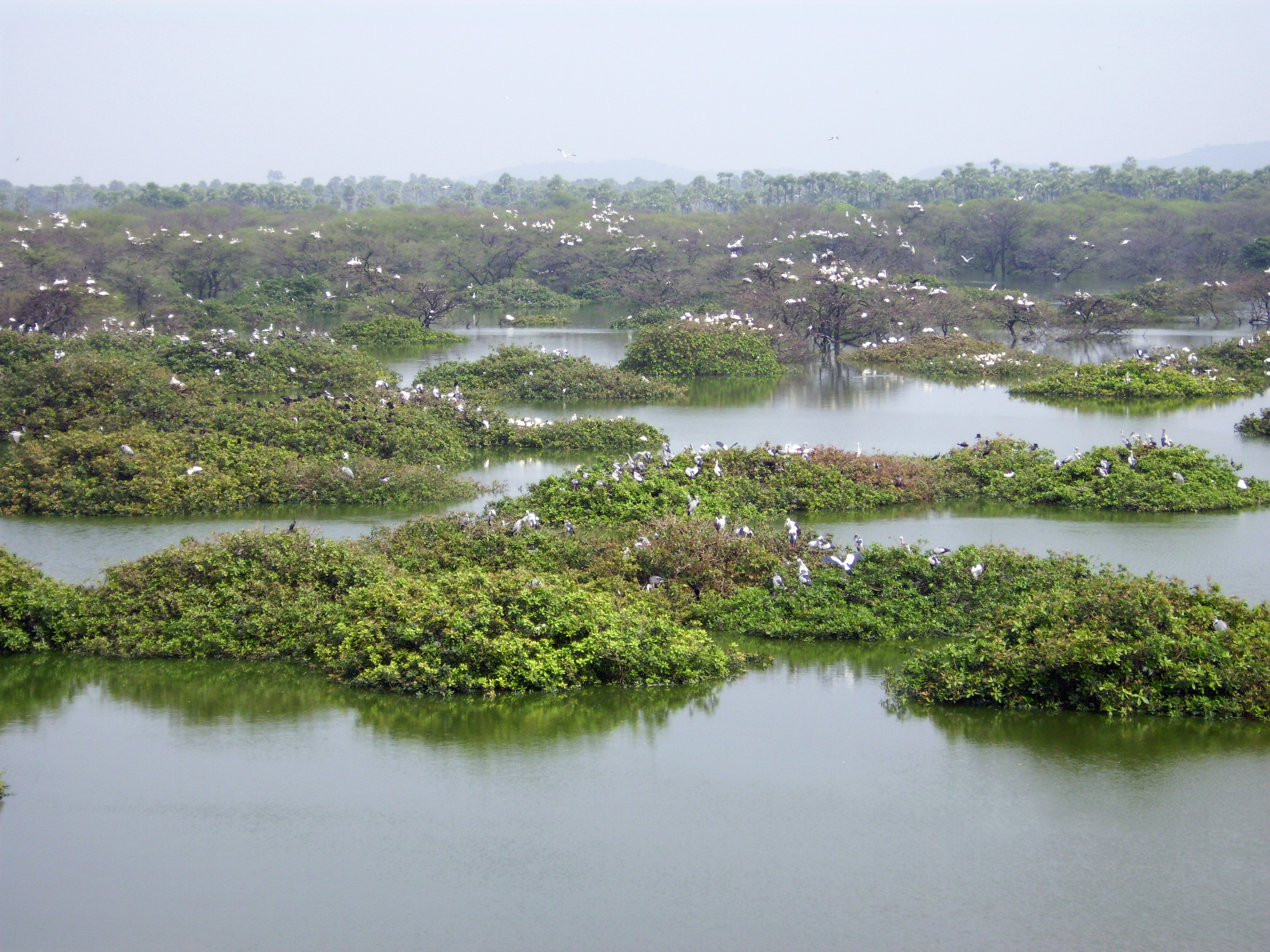
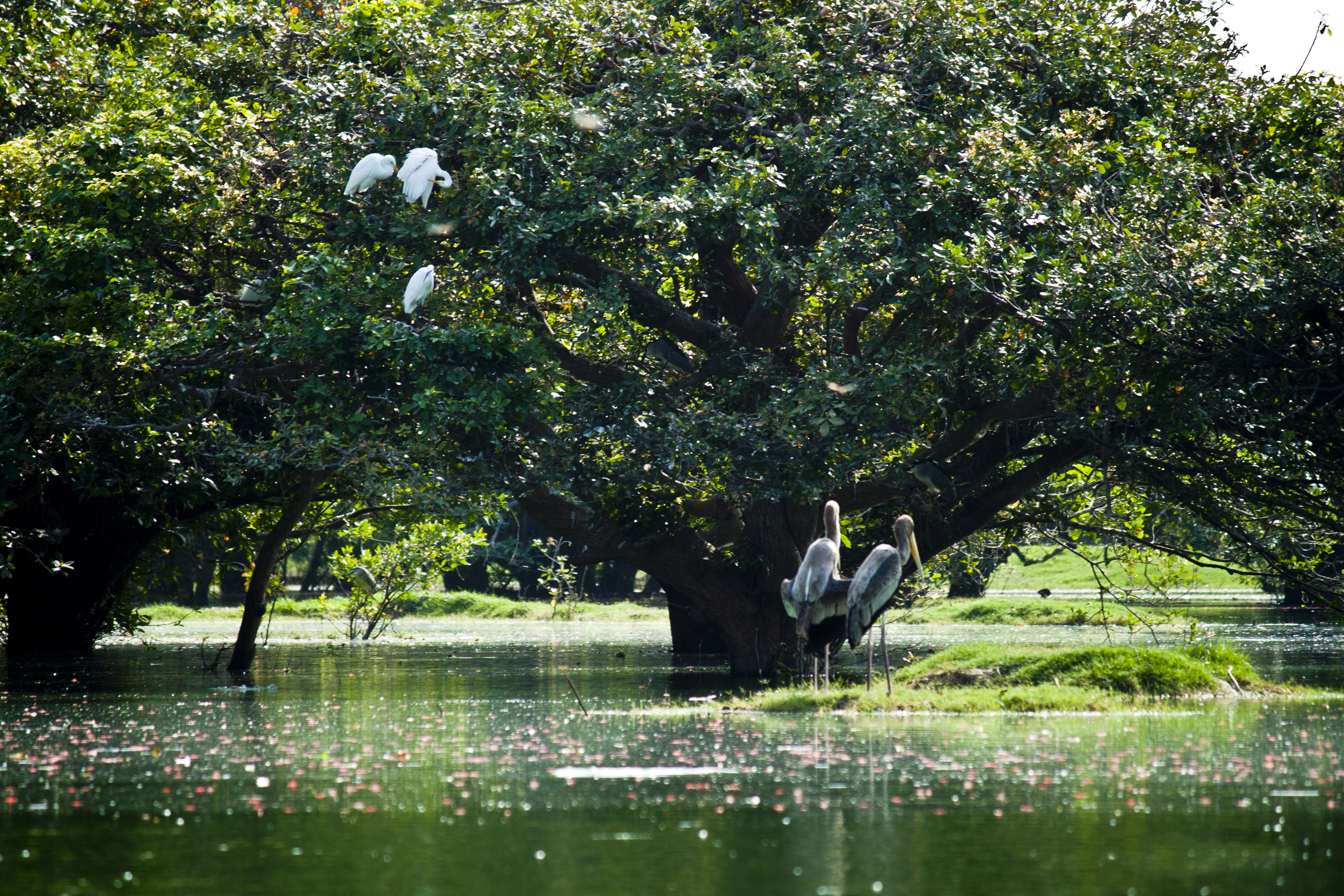
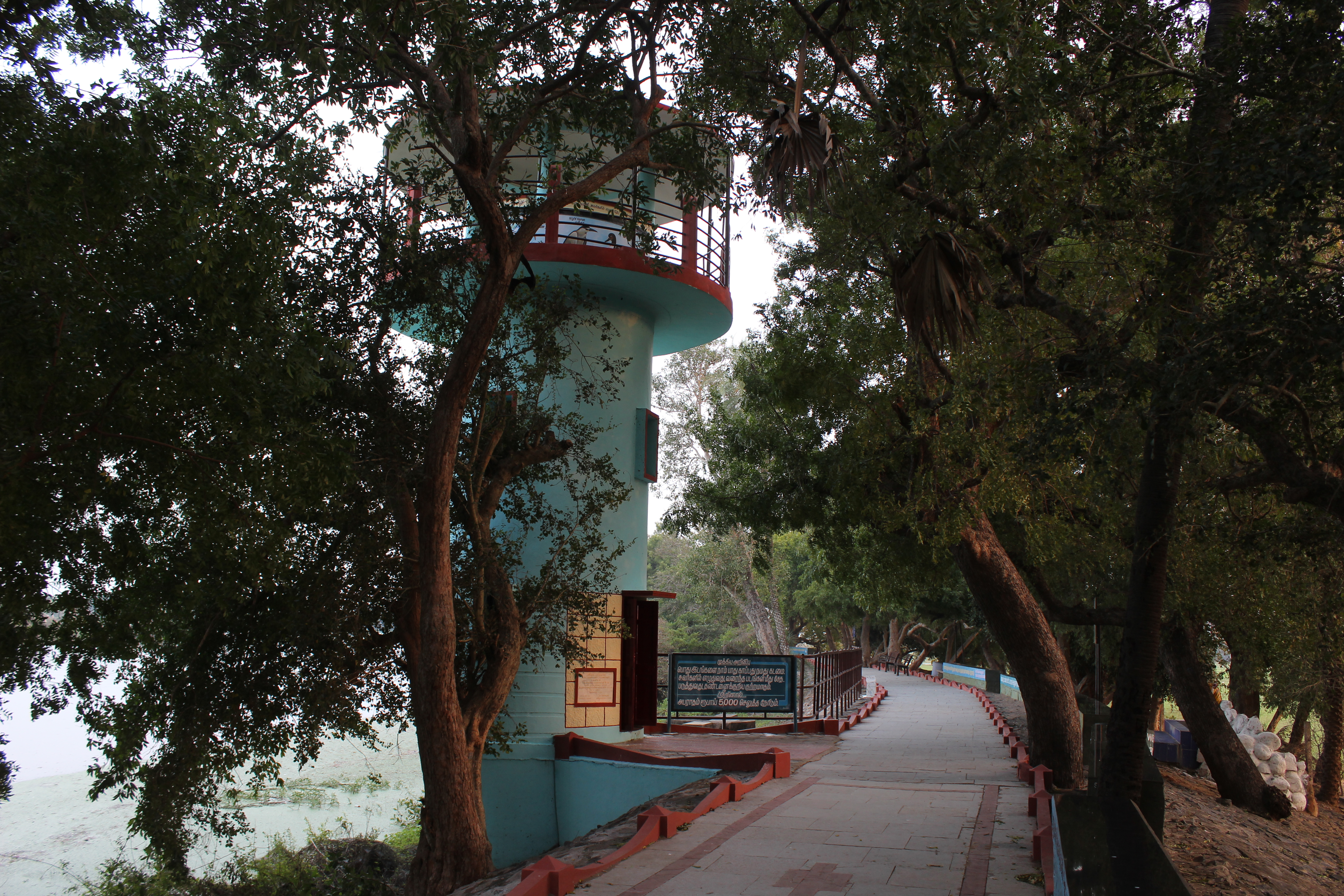
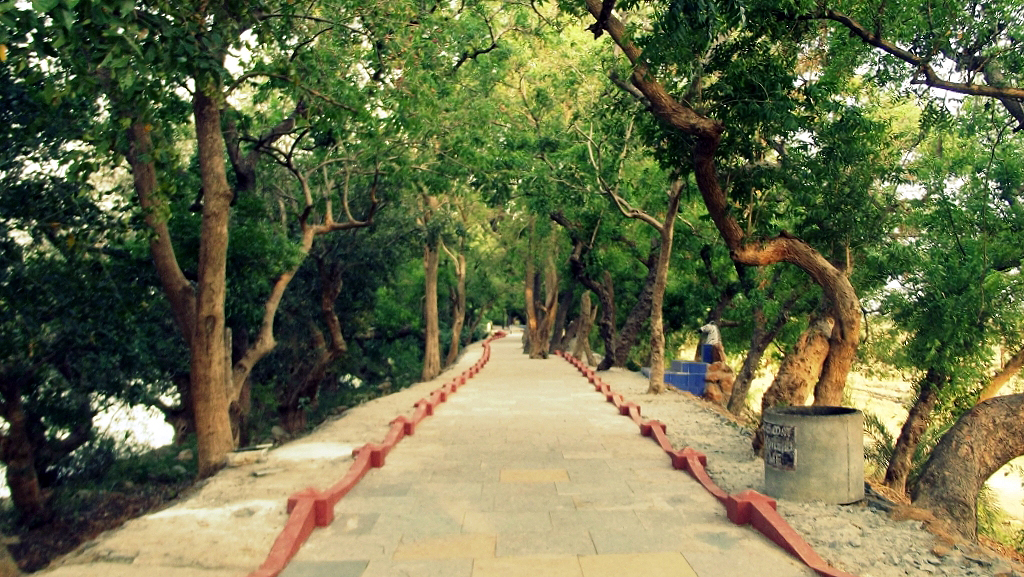
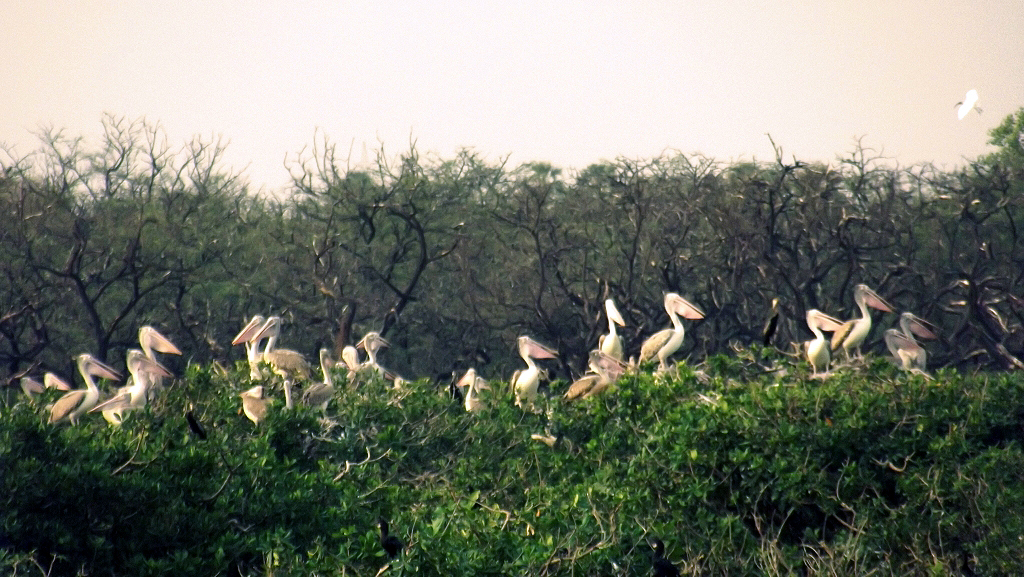
- Clockwise from top: A view of the sanctuary; Watch tower in the sanctuary; Resting pelicans; Walkway inside the sanctuary; Barringtonia trees in the lake

- Location within Tamil Nadu Location within India
- Interactive map of Vedanthangal Bird Sanctuary
- Location: Chengalpattu district, Tamil Nadu, India
- Nearest city: Kanchipuram
- Coordinates: 12°32′44″N 79°51′21″E
- Area: 30 ha (74 acres)
- Elevation: 122 m (400 ft)
- Established: 1936
- Governing body: Ministry of Environment and Forests, Government of India

Ramsar Wetland
- Official name: Vedanthangal Bird Sanctuary
- Designated: 8 April 2022
- Reference no.: 2477

Vedanthangal Bird Sanctuary is a bird sanctuary in the Madurantakam taluk of the Chengalpattu district in the Indian state of Tamil Nadu. Established in 1936, it is the oldest wildlife sanctuary in India. It has been designated as a protected Ramsar site since 2022. More than 40,000 birds have been recorded in the sanctuary during the migratory season every year.

== History ==
The Vedanthangal freshwater lake attracts water birds, and the area was protected by the local people, who benefited from the manure-rich water from the lake. The guano of the birds increased the agriculture yield of the surrounding fields. The area was later used as hunting grounds for sport hunting of birds by the rich in the early 17th century. Vedanthangal literally means the 'hamlet of the hunter' in Tamil language. Towards the end of the 18th century, locals complained to the District Collector of Chingleput district about the British soldiers shooting the birds and obtained a cowle (a written acceptance) from the collector to protect the birds. Due to its ecological importance, the British Government initiated further steps to develop it into a bird sanctuary in 1798. Several accounts of the area being a breeding place for birds were published in the 19th century.

In the mid 19th century, the collector of Chingleput ordered it to be established as a protected area. It was officially declared as a wildlife sanctuary in 1936 and was the first such protected area to be established within the Indian boundaries. The surrounding wetland was declared as reserve area as per the Madras Forest Act, 1882 on 4 June 1962. Subsequently, the surrounding 5 km (3.1 mi) zone were declared as part of the sanctuary as per the Wildlife Protection Act, 1972 in 1996 and the final notification was issued on 8 July 1998.

== Description ==
The sanctuary occupies an area of 74 acres (30 ha) and is one of the smallest wildlife sanctuaries in India. The sanctuary consists of many small water bodies interconnected with the main tank, located at an altitude of about 122 m (400 ft). The maximum depth of the lake is 5 m (16 ft) and it supplies water to nearly 250 acres of agricultural land in the region. The west and south sides of the lake are bordered by a long bund, whereas the northern and eastern sides extend to the agricultural lands. The area receives an average annual rainfall of 140 cm (55 in), mostly from the north-east monsoon. There is a 24 ft (7.3 m) observation tower in the sanctuary. In 2013, the lake was de-silted and new water channels were built by the Public Works Department to facilitate water supply to the lake from neighbouring water bodies.

== Flora ==
The sanctuary consists of a mixture of tropical and sub-tropical dry broadleaf forests interspersed with thorns and shrubs. The wetland and the surrounding areas have been subject to deforestation and over grazing from domestic livestock, which resulted in the stunted scrub vegetation. There are two distinct types of vegetation in the sanctuary. The water area mainly consists of Barringtonia acutangula and Acacia nilotica trees, most of which were planted by the Tamil Nadu Forest Department and are the main nest-supporting trees. The Barringtonia trees also serve as roosts for the non-breeding birds and safe high perches for the young lings. In 2013, a further two lakh Barringtonia saplings were planted in the sanctuary.

The periphery of the tank and the tank bund consists of a number of Terminalia arjuna trees. The tank bund also consists of Streblus and Calamus trees. There are other species such as Acacia nilotica, Alangium salviifolium, Albizzia lebbek, Azadirachta indica, Morinda tinctoria, Borassus flabellifer, Cassia fistula, and Solanum trilobatum on the area surrounding the tank. The partly submerged scrubs around the tank provide twigs for the birds to build nests and also serve as roosting grounds.

== Fauna ==
The unique ecosystem attracts a rich diversity of birds. Nearly 40000 birds are seen in the tank during the breeding season. When the nesting birds return with the young lings, there can be over 70000 birds in a good monsoon year. The prime nesting species seen in the sanctuary are spot billed pelican, Asian open-billed stork, painted stork, Indian cormorant, little cormorant, black-crowned night heron, little egret, intermediate egret, grey heron, glossy ibis, black-headed ibis, Eurasian spoonbill, and Indian pond heron. Migratory waterbirds wintering here include northern pintail, garganey, northern shoveller, black-winged stilt, and other shorebirds and terns such as whiskered tern. Cattle egrets and little cormorants are also seen outside the breeding season. Other terrestrial birds such as darters, parakeets, babblers, mynas, barbets, bee-eaters, kingfishers, roller, cuckoo, oriole, drongo, and raptors such as black-winged kite, brahminy kite, short-toed eagle, pariah kite have been observed in Vedanthangal.

Mammals seen in the sanctuary include Indian jackal, jungle cat, wild boar, black-naped hare, bonnet macaque, mongoose, mole rat, palm civet, flying fox, and Indian fox. A large number of fruit bats are also present in the bamboo trees around the lake. There are also reptiles and amphibians such as water snakes, Indian cobra, sand boas, terrapins, tortoises, lizards, and frogs.

== Gallery ==
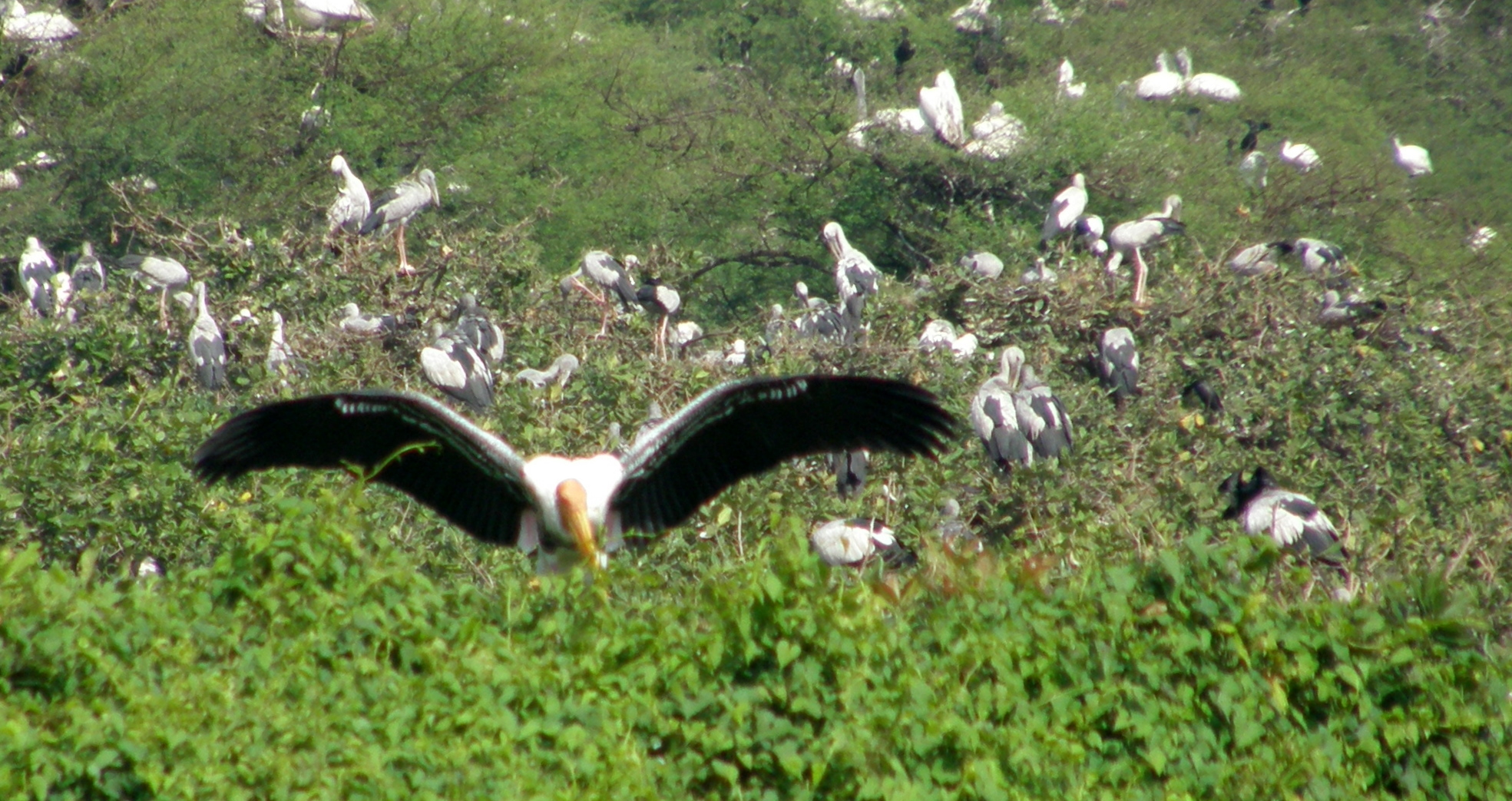
Birds at the sanctuary

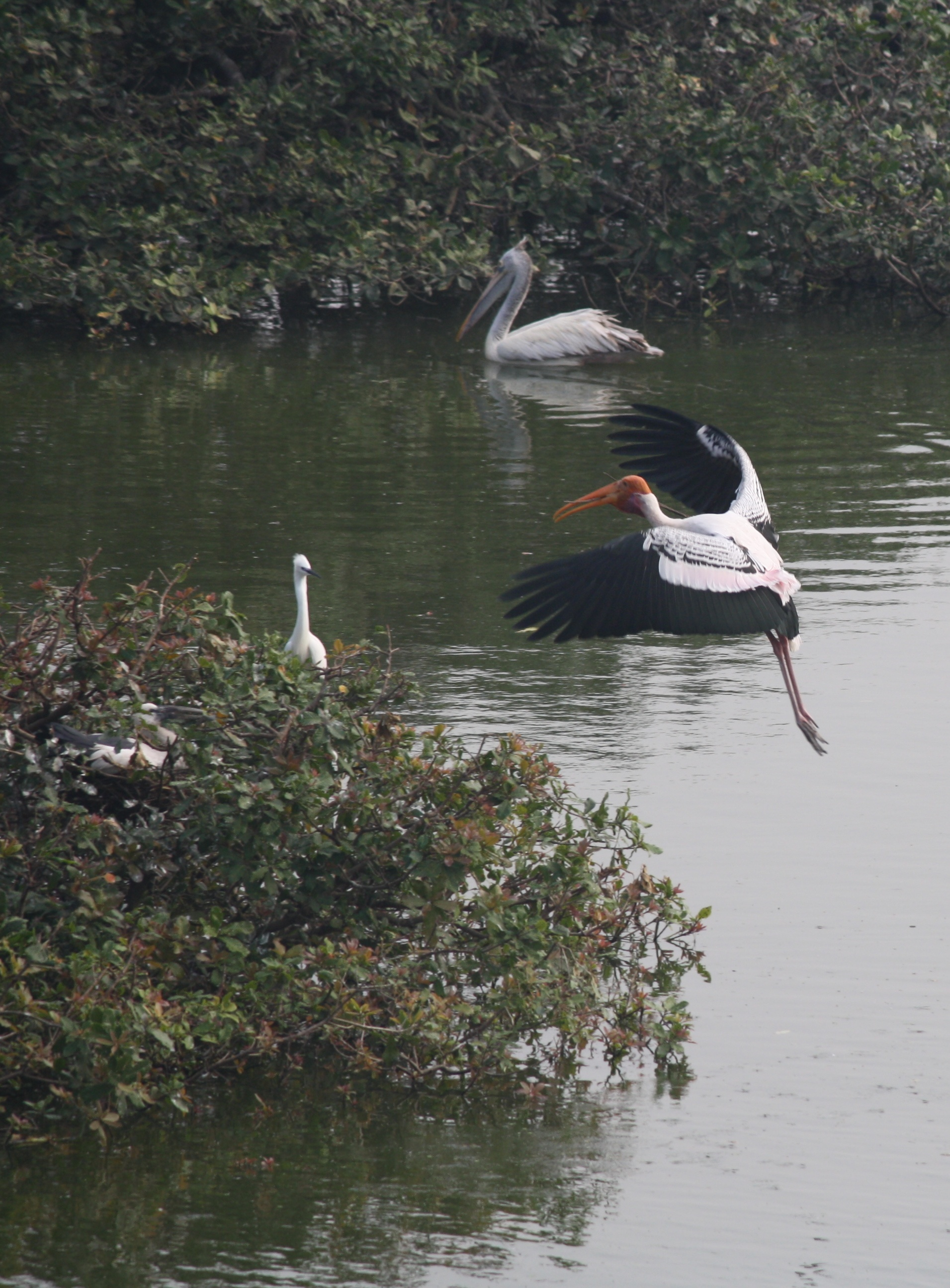
Spot-billed pelican, painted stork, little egret and open-billed stork

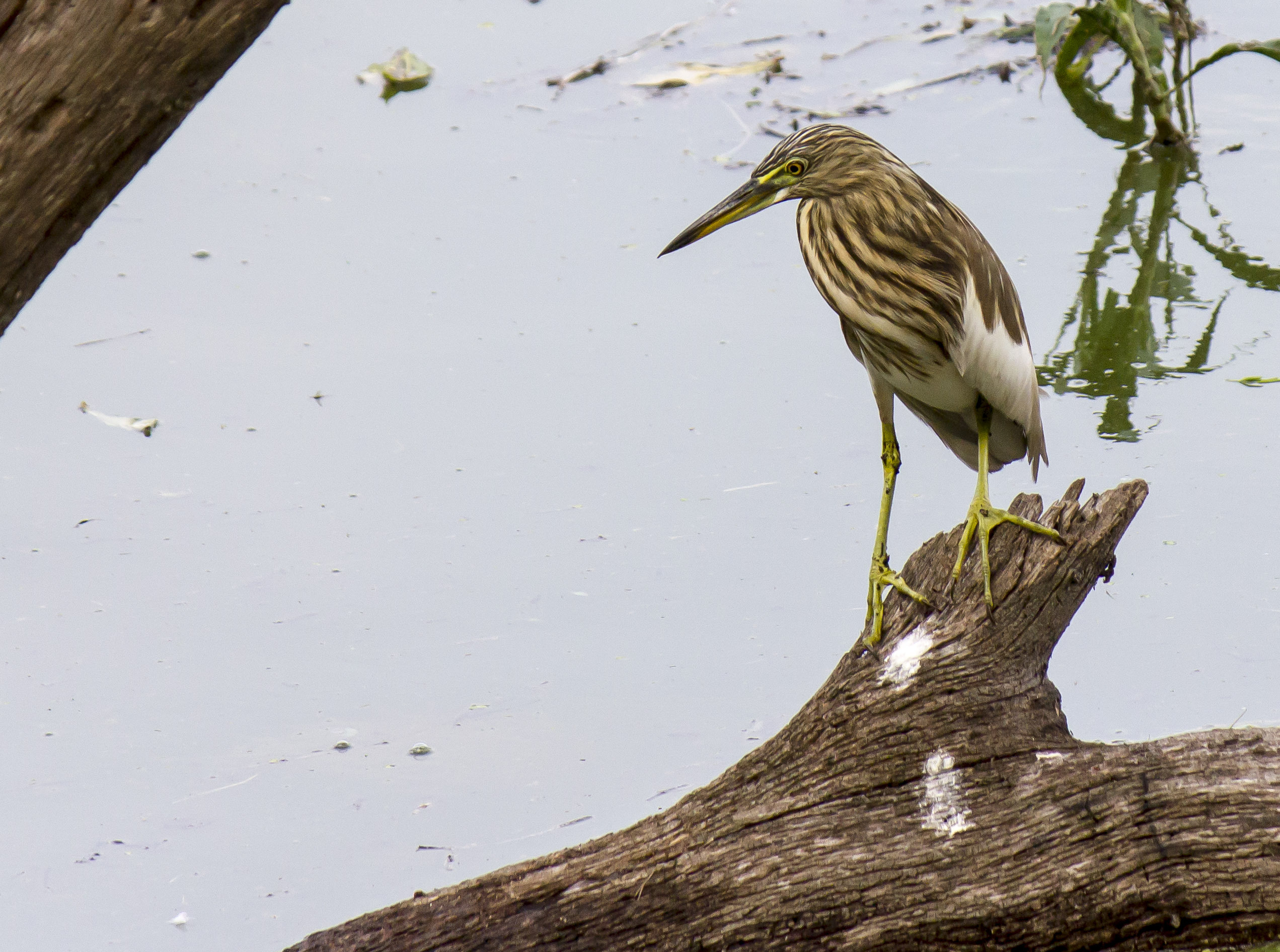
Indian pond heron

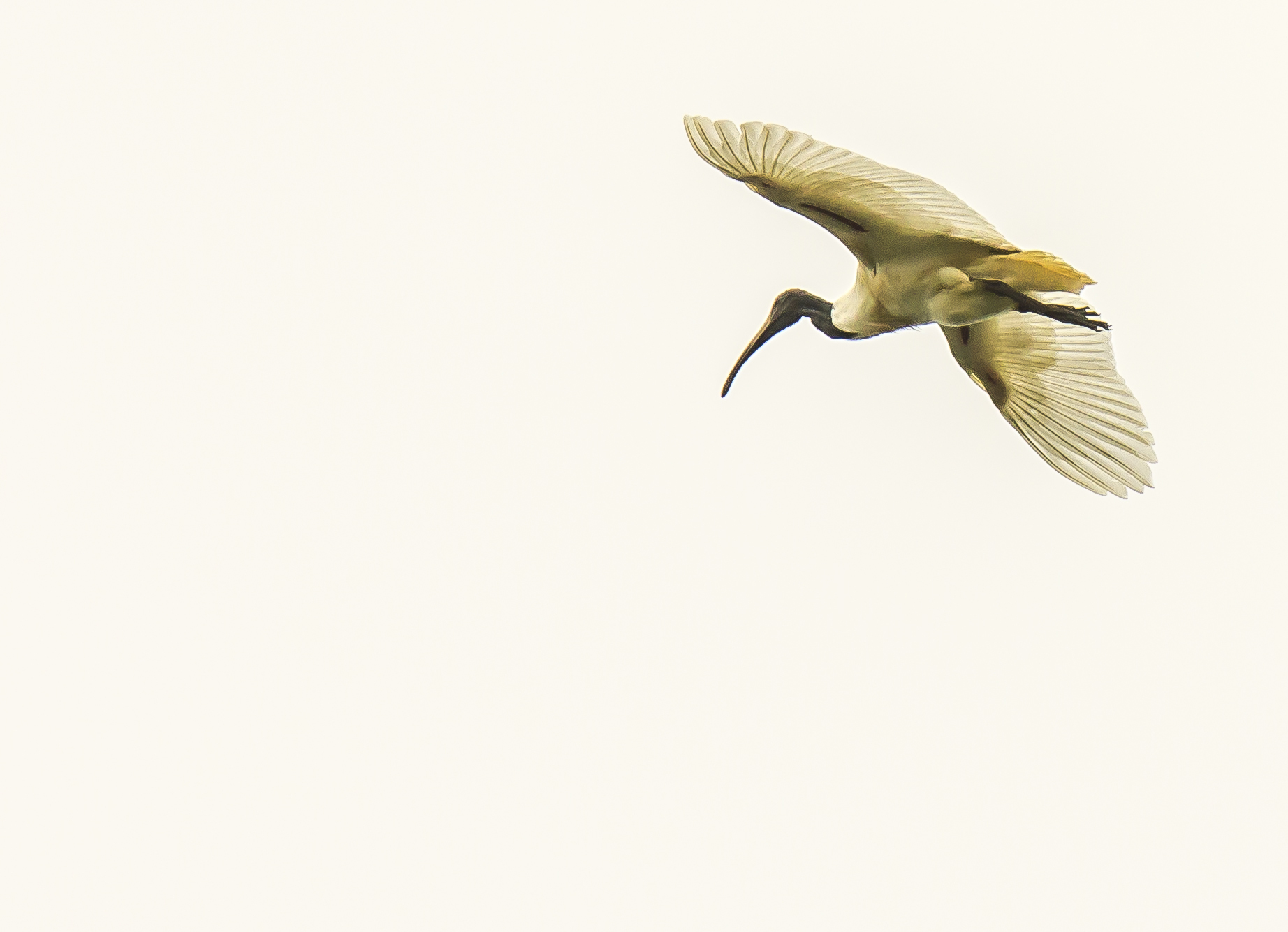
Black-headed ibis

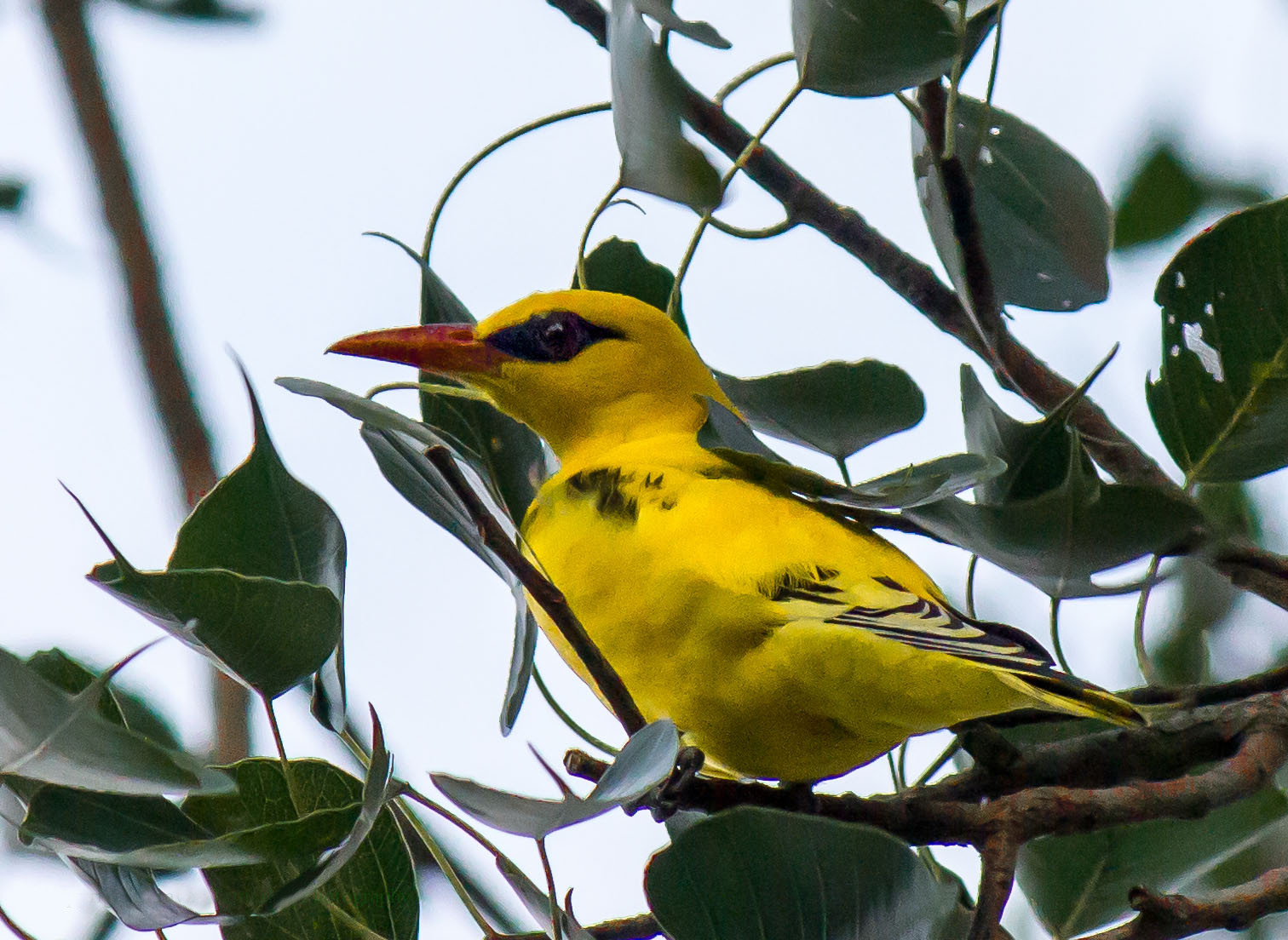
Golden oriole

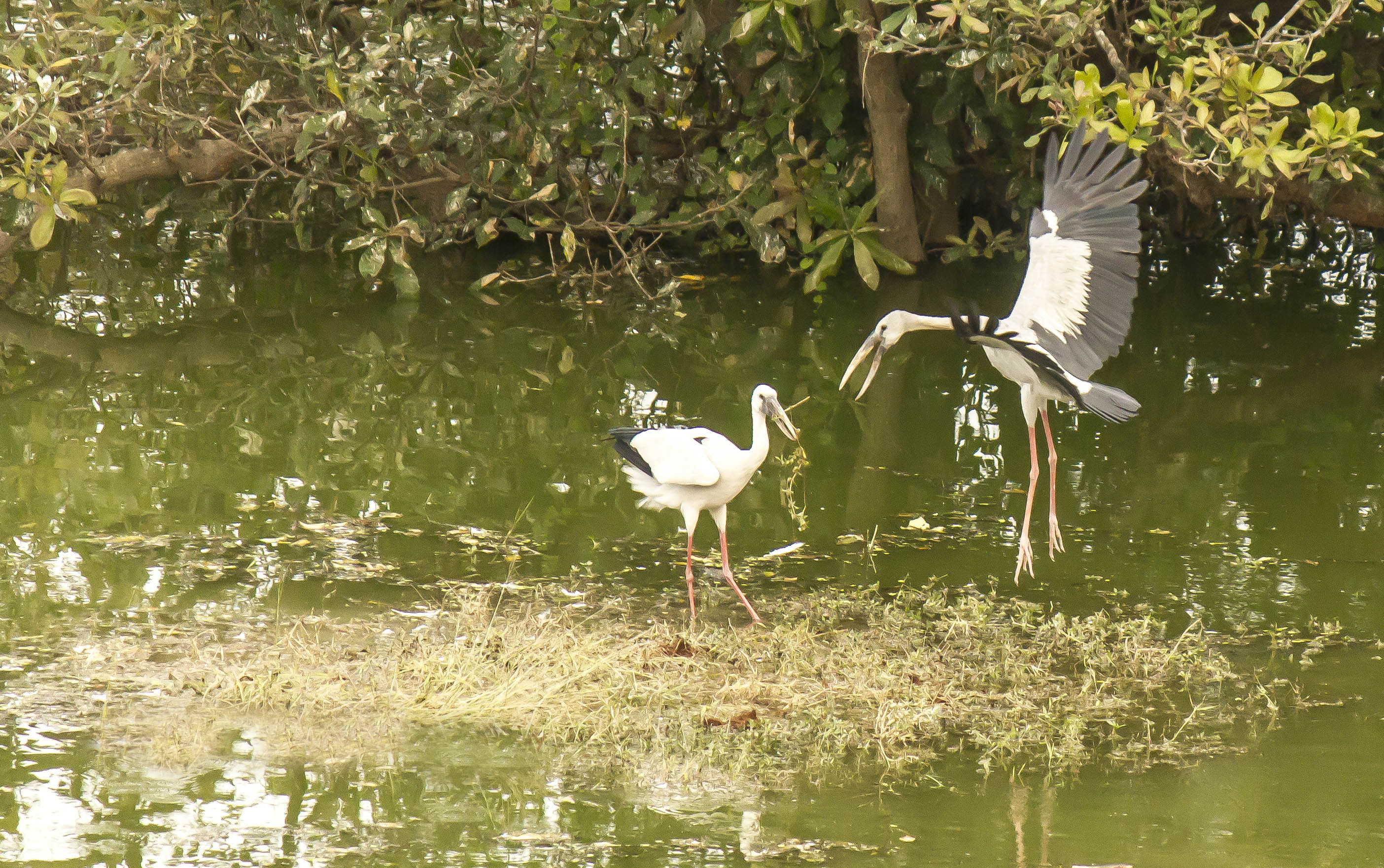
Open-billed stork

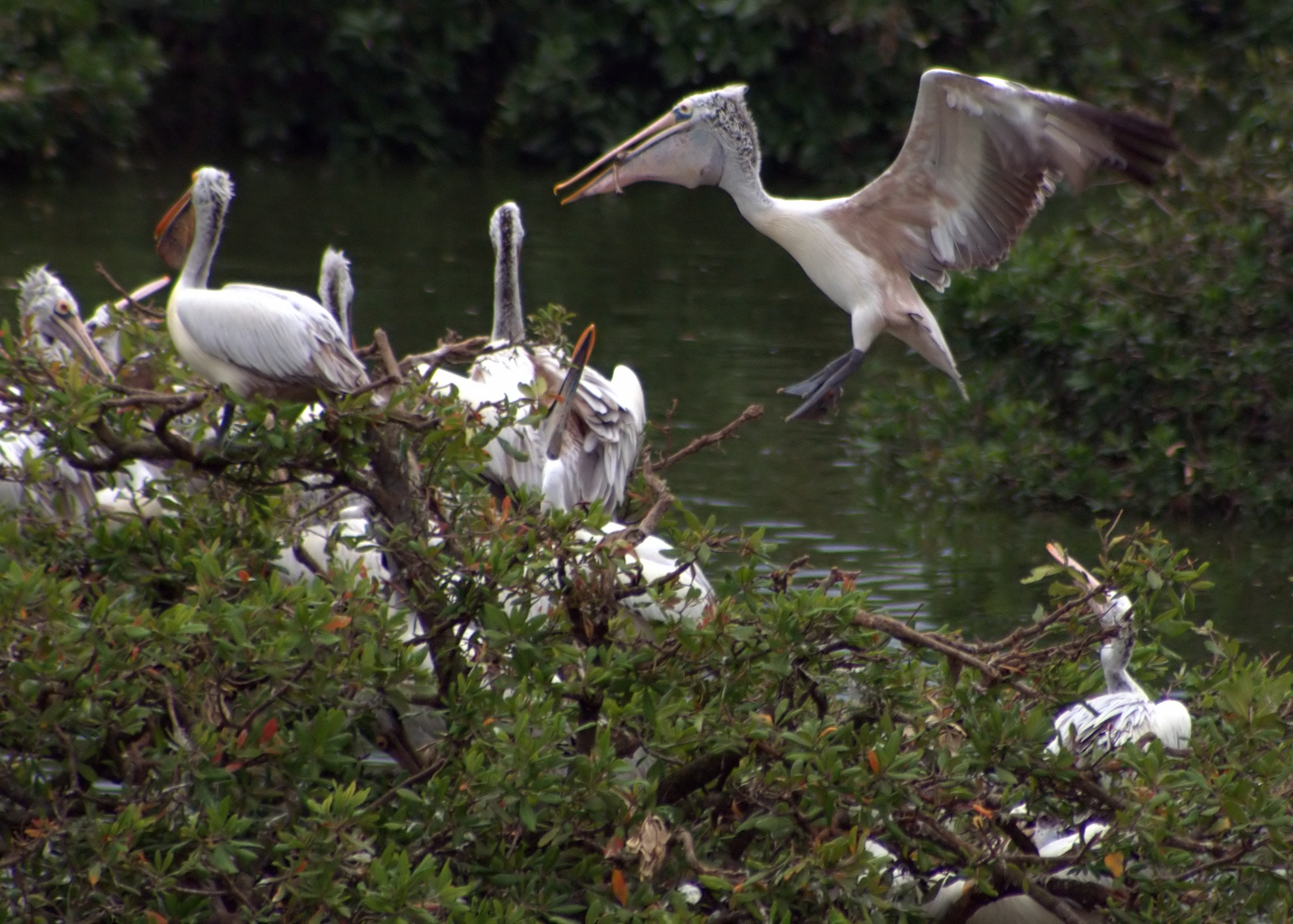
Spot-billed pelicans

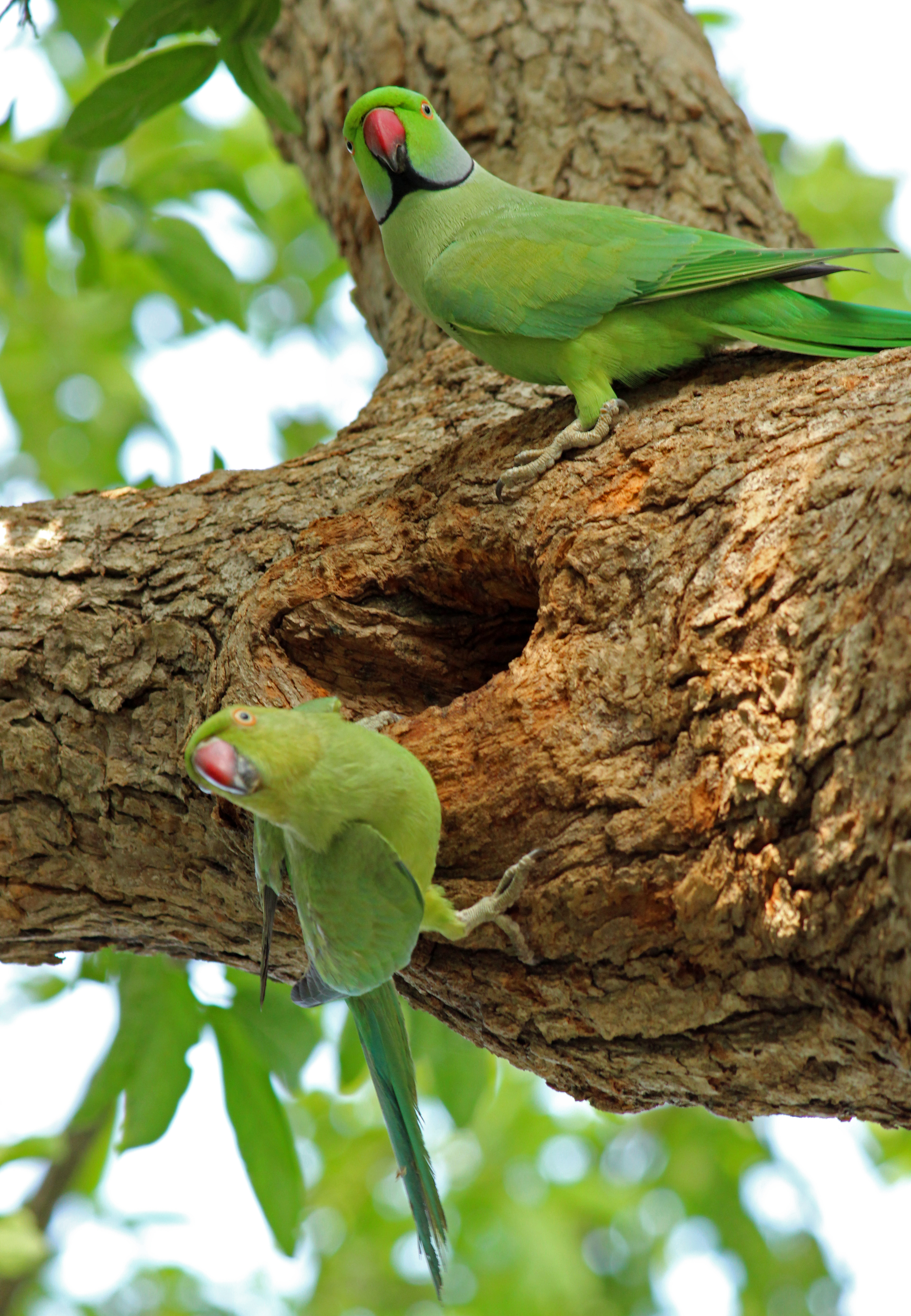
Green parakeet

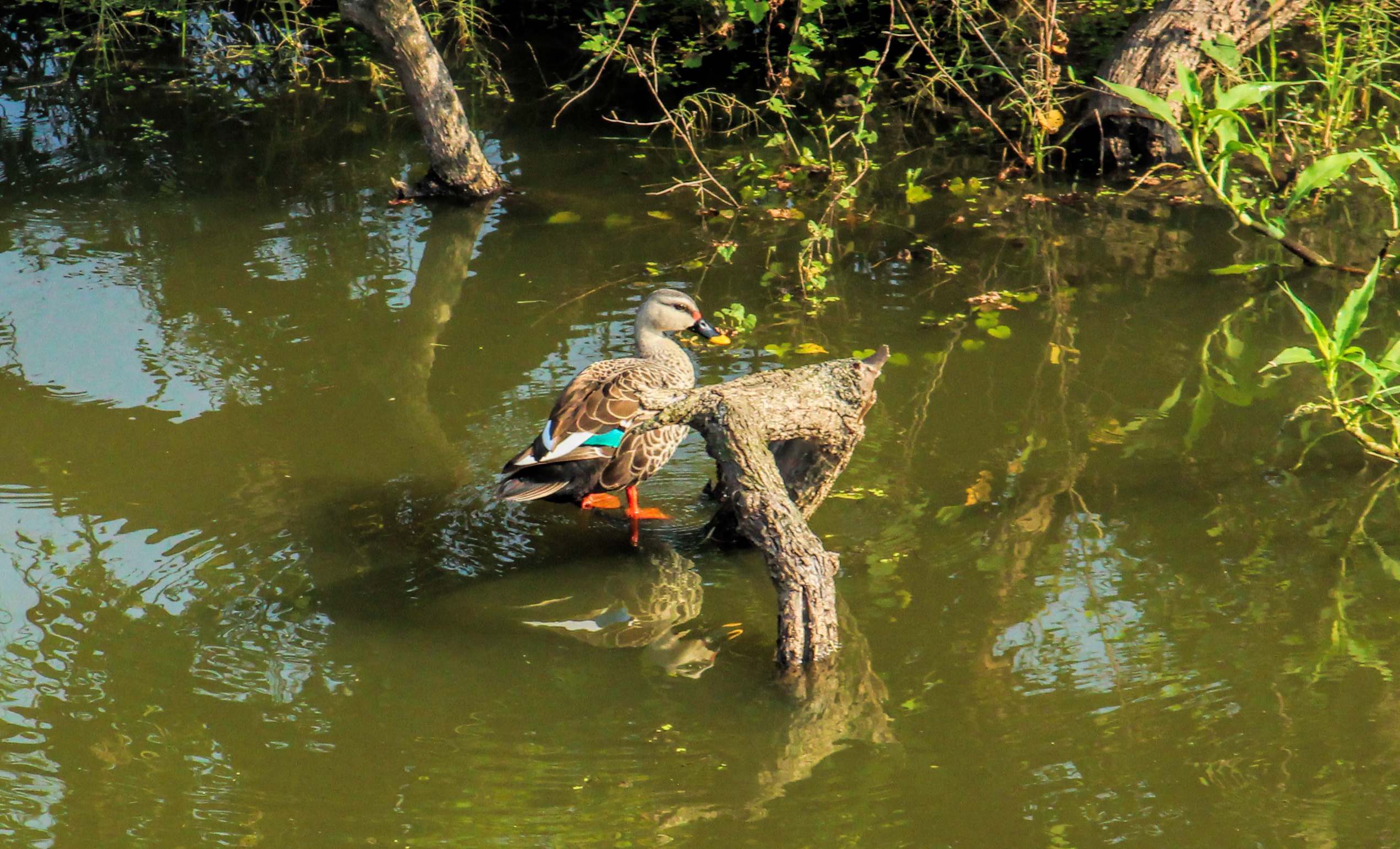
Spot-billed duck

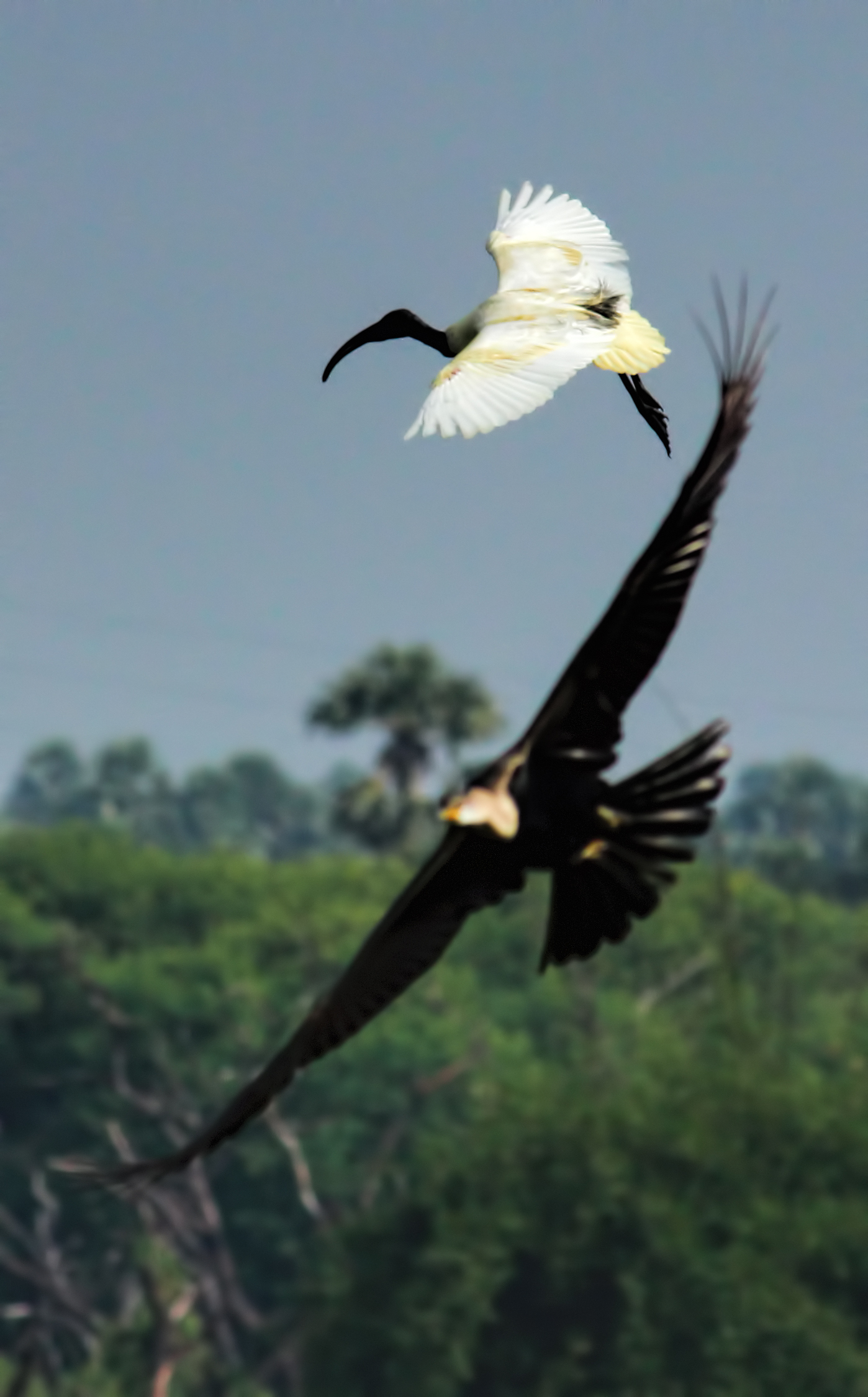
Darter and ibis

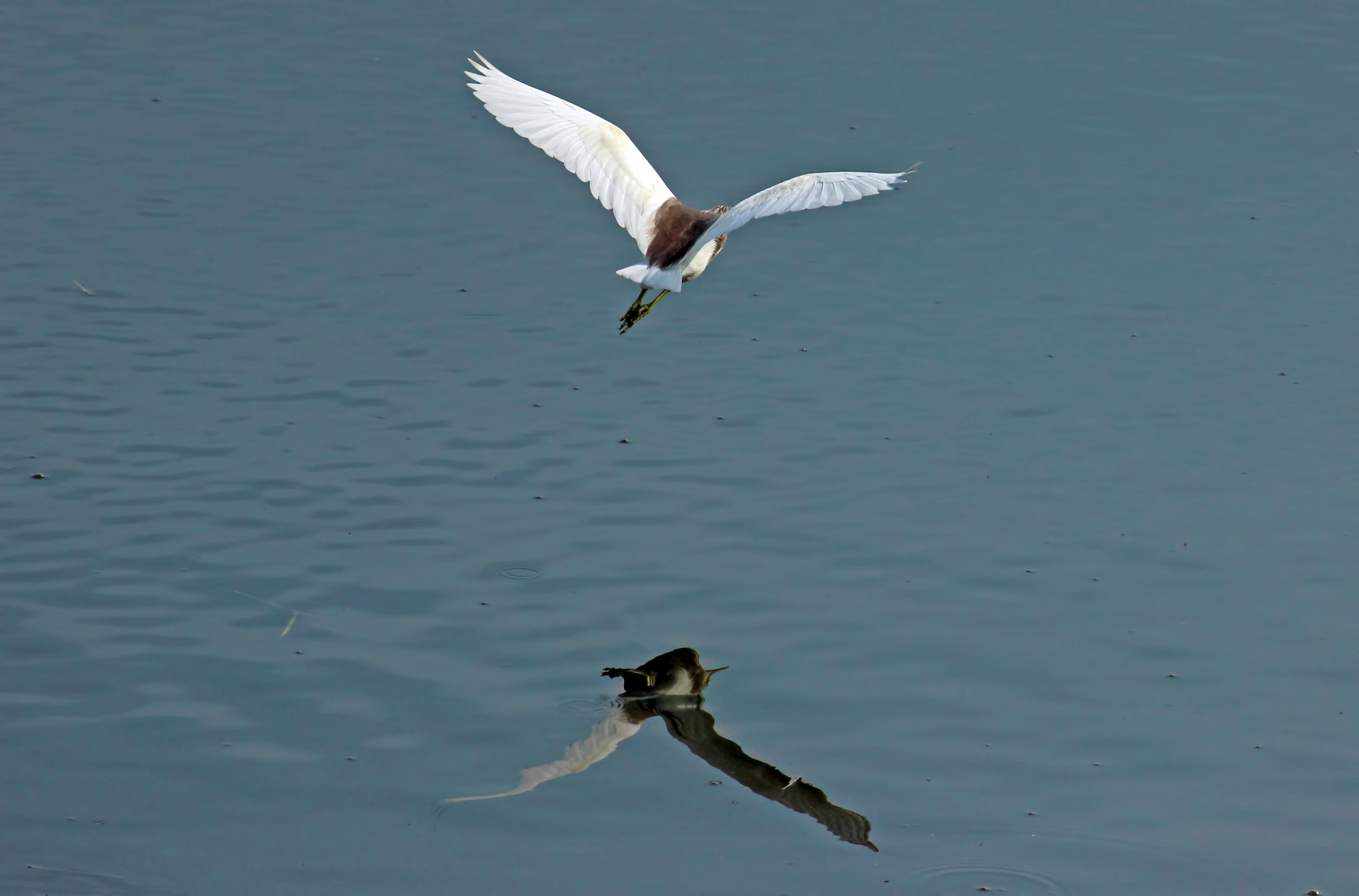
Pond heron

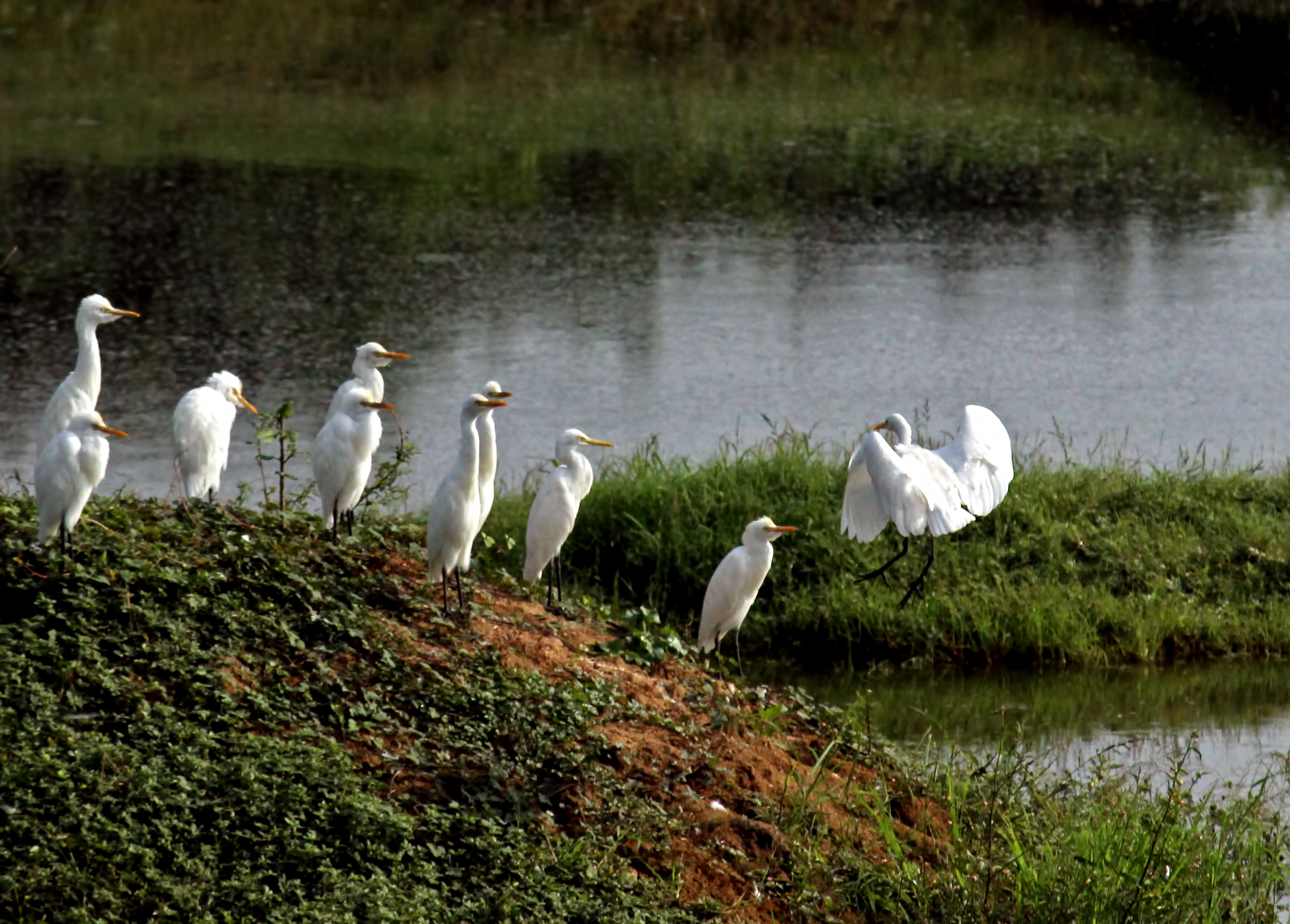
Eastern cattle egret

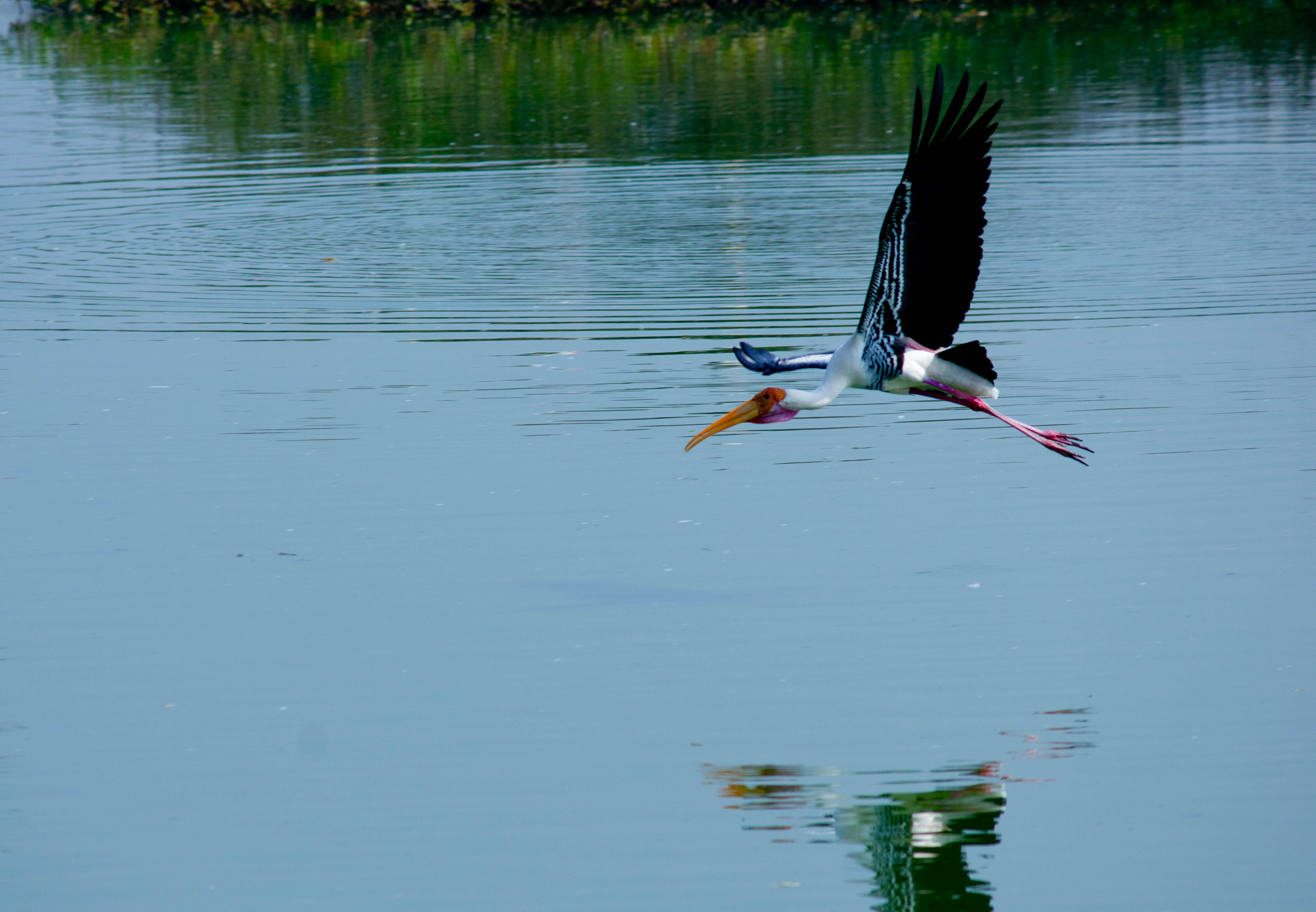
Painted stork

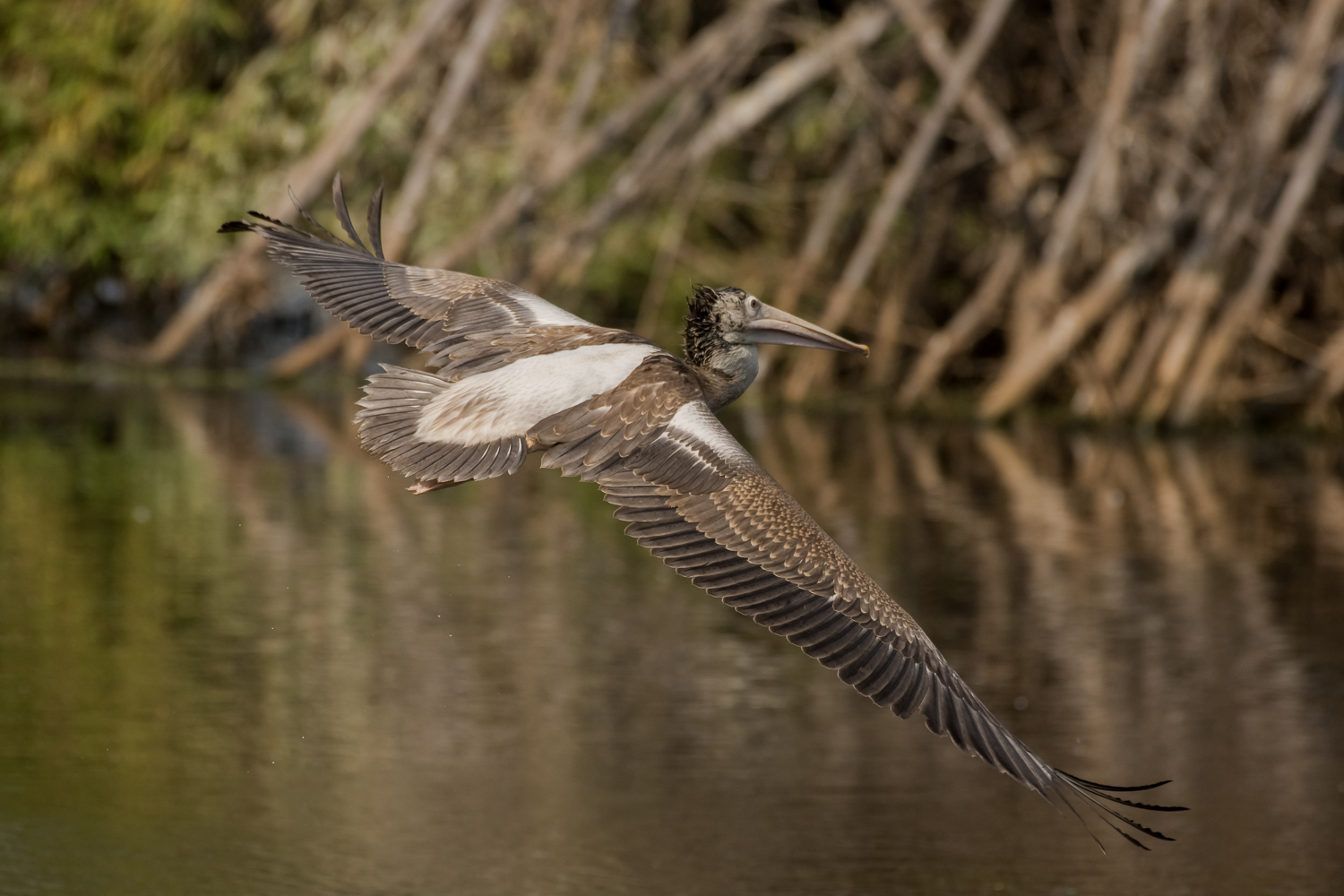
Spot-billed pelican

== See also ==
- List of birds of Tamil Nadu
- List of birds of South India
- List of wildlife sanctuaries of India
