= Kumki, Arunachal Pradesh =

Kumki
- village
- Location in Arunachal Pradesh, India Kumki (India)
- Coordinates: 27.266°N 96.9°E
- Country: India
- State: Arunachal Pradesh
- District: Changlang

Languages
  - Official: English
- Time zone: UTC+5:30 (IST)
- ISO 3166 code: IN-AR
- Vehicle registration: AR

Kumki is a town in Arunachal Pradesh in the district of Changlang. It is one of the easternmost permanently populated towns of India.
