= Kumki (film) =

2012 film by Prabu Solomon

- Theatrical release poster
- Directed by: Prabhu Solomon
- Written by: Prabhu Solomon
- Produced by: N. Lingusamy (presenter); N. Subash Chandra Bose
- Starring: Vikram Prabhu; Lakshmi Menon
- Cinematography: M. Sukumar
- Edited by: L. V. K. Doss
- Music by: D. Imman
- Production company: Thirrupathi Brothers
- Distributed by: Studio Green
- Release date: 14 December 2012
- Running time: 148 minutes
- Country: India
- Language: Tamil

Kumki (transl. Trained elephant) is a 2012 Indian Tamil-language adventure romantic drama film written and directed by Prabhu Solomon. Produced by Thirrupathi Brothers, the film stars Vikram Prabhu, in his acting debut, while Lakshmi Menon, Thambi Ramaiah and Ashvin Raja appear in prominent roles. It revolves around a mahout and his elephant, who is used to guide other wild animals to minimise the destruction of properties and fields of nearby villages.

Filming began in September 2011 and took place in various places of Karnataka and Kerala; it was completed within 80 working days. The film's music was composed by D. Imman, the cinematography was handled by M. Sukumar and editing by L. V. K. Dass.

Kumki was released on 14 December 2012 by Studio Green. The film was a critical and a commercial success. It won three awards at the 60th Filmfare Awards South, including Best Supporting Actor (Ramaiah). The film won seven Tamil Nadu State Film Awards, two Vijay Awards, three South Indian International Movie Awards and three Ananda Vikatan Cinema Awards. A spiritual successor Kumki 2, also directed by Solomon, was released in 2025.

== Plot ==
The film starts with an introduction to the main characters: the protagonist Bomman, Bomman's pet elephant Manickam, Bomman's uncle Kothali, and Bomman's sidekick Undiyal. Bomman spends most of his time with Manickam and earns his livelihood by hiring it out for festivals in temples and wedding celebrations. Meanwhile, in a village dominated by old principles, a rogue elephant (Komban) ravages crops and ambushes its people. Frustrated by this and without any help from the forest officers, their leader decides to bring a trained elephant to Komban. Bomman and his crew reach the village as placeholders to stay for a couple of days until the real mahout and trained elephant arrive.

Life begins to change for Bomman when he falls in love with Alli, the daughter of the village leader. Alli is at first reluctant keeping in mind the village's principles but soon Alli starts to fall in love for Bomman. Life goes on smoothly, until Komban randomly starts attacking the village. On the eve of their departure, Komban attacks Manickam. Komban kills Kothali and Undiyal and injure Bomman. In the ensuing fight between Manickam and Komban, Manickam kills Komban but Manickam suffers serious injuries and he dies. Bomman then cries out loud, regretting that his love had led to the deaths of his crew and Manickam. Alli's father then recognises that Bomman and Alli are in love. The film then ends abruptly, leaving Bomman's fate to the viewer's imagination.

== Cast ==
My son surprised me by his performance in Kumki. I used to call my son during his film shoot and enquire about his performance. "Wait and see daddy", would be his answer.

— Prabhu, on Vikram's experience of playing the character of Bomman.
- Vikram Prabhu as Bomman
  - Jeffin as young Bomman
- Lakshmi Menon as Alli
- Thambi Ramaiah as Kothalli
- Ashvin Raja as Undiyal
- Junior Balaiah as villager
- Joe Malloori as Maathayaan
- Yaar Kannan as villager
- Sreejith Ravi as Forest Officer
- Munnar Ramesh
- Manickam as the elephant

== Production ==
=== Development ===
"People perceive elephants as fearsome animals. We often read in newspapers that elephants come out from forests to villages and destroy crops. But no one really understands that deforestation and building concrete jungles leads to such situations. You may recall the recent landmark judgment of the High Court about the protection of Elephant corridors in the Nilgiris. The order suggested halting construction of any form, whether resorts or anything else. My script will be on similar lines, against the backdrop of a wild love story."

— Prabhu Solomon

In June 2011, it was announced that Prabhu Solomon was directing a "love story set in a village in the forest area where elephants roam freely, creating man-animal conflicts" and was based on a real life incident. Despite reports that it was titled Komban, the title was later confirmed to be Kumki. The film was presented by N. Lingusamy and produced by N. Subash Chandrabose under Thirrupathi Brothers.

Solomon considered Kumki a research-based film similar to his previous Mynaa (2010), which served as a campaign to save the elephants which had been portrayed in bad light owing to incidents such as straying into villages and violent attacks, but neither consider deforestation and encroachment of forest areas lead to this situation. Solomon went on an extensive location scouting across Tamil Nadu, Kerala and Karnataka, as a part of pre-production. He added that the film focuses on the friendship between a man and elephant, as the tagline suggested "a wild love story" used in the promotions.

During an interaction with Nikhil Raghavan of The Hindu, Solomon felt that the success of Mynaa was due to his creative control—as he was the director and producer of the film—which helped him to pay more attention to detail. As Kumki was an even bigger venture he "didn't want anything to go wrong". At that time, Lingusamy's interest in producing the venture was considered a delight for Solomon. Prior to the start of production, Solomon sent the script to the Animal Welfare Board of India for their permission.

=== Casting ===
A 12 feet (3.7 m) tall elephant named Manickam was brought from Ottapalam for this film. Though established actors wanted to be cast in the lead role without offering renumeration, Solomon wanted a new face for the role of Bomman. After 60 people were auditioned for the role, Vikram Prabhu (son of actor Prabhu) who participated in the auditions was selected. Vikram, a B. A. graduate in theatre arts at the San Diego State University, California, had earlier worked as an assistant director for films like Sarvam (2009) and Aasal (2010). Solomon came his across his portfolio from a family friend which led to him being impressed after seeing his appearance, height and physique of a mahout.

Vikram sported a rugged look wearing a beard and moustache. Before filming, Vikram went to a training camp for 15 days in Ottapalam so that he could get full-fledged preparations on how to train elephants and further asked to polish his gymnastic skills so that his physique could be maintained. Lakshmi Menon was cast for the role of the tribal girl, Alli, after she featured in a cover of a Malayalam magazine that got Solomon's attention. While Kumki was the first film in Tamil she signed, her other film, Sundarapandian, was released before Kumki. That film's director S. R. Prabhakaran cast Menon after seeing photographs of her in Kumki.

Thambi Ramaiah who previously appeared in Mynaa, for which he won the National Film Award for Best Actor in a Supporting Role was cast in a pivotal role, as did Ashvin Raja who had allotted sixty-six days for the film. Other supporting cast members included Joe Malloori, Sreejith Ravi, Munnar Ramesh, Junior Balaiah and Yaar Kannan.

=== Filming ===
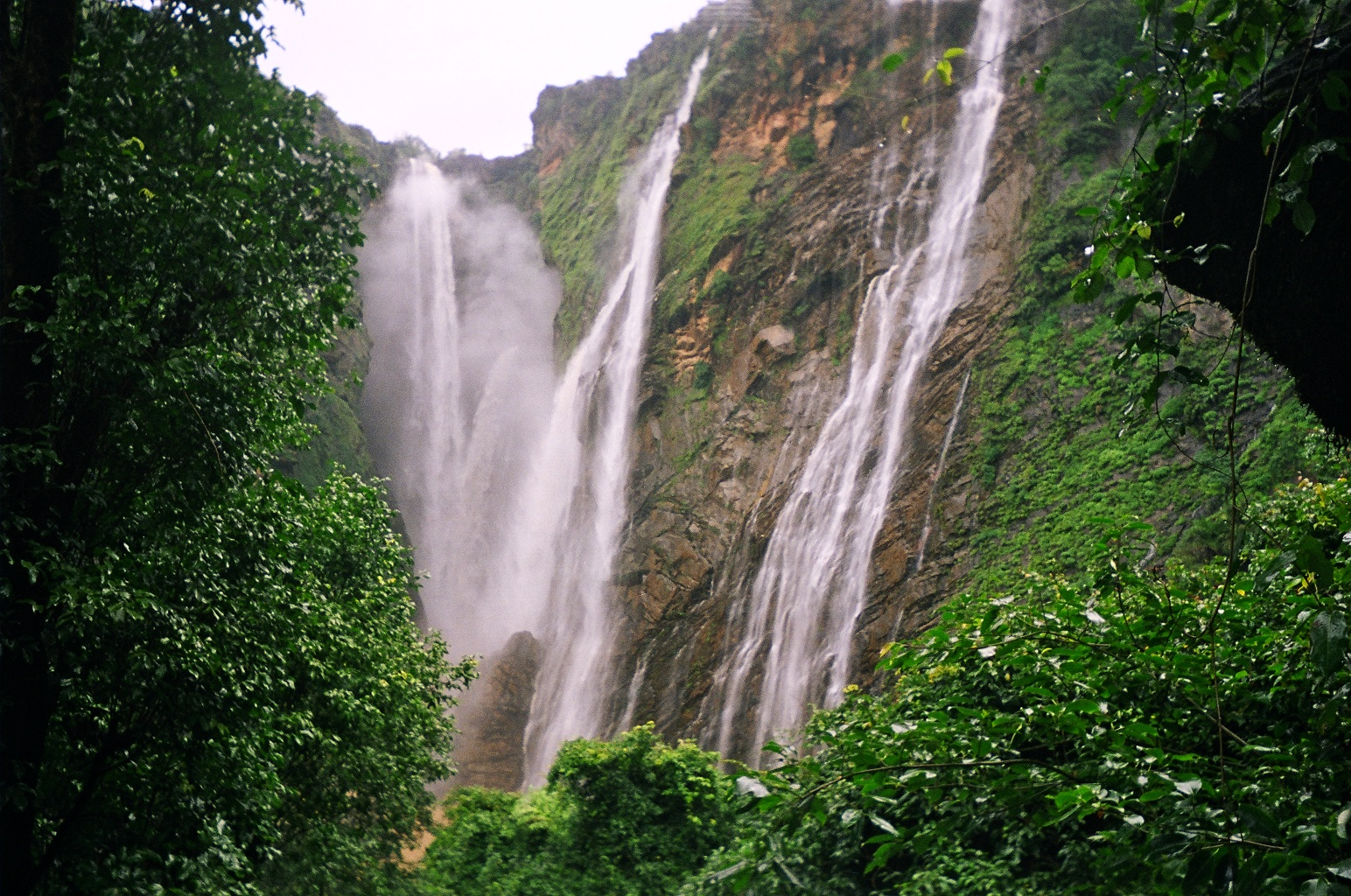
Jog Falls seen in the song "Sollitale"

Filming began in September 2011 at Araku Valley. Solomon chose the location primarily as it "has red soil and the entire terrain will shine with beautiful yellow flowers in bloom". The entire film was shot in Tamil Nadu, Kerala, Karnataka and in the border of Andhra Pradesh and Orissa. Throughout the filming, Solomon ensured the services of veterinary doctors to present in the shooting spots to treat the elephant.

As the team had to accommodate the extensive weather conditions and availability of animals, filming had to be extended till mid-2012. The song "Sollitale" was shot in the Jog Falls and parts of the dense forest sequences were shot in Kerala and at the Athirappilly Falls. The Athikaadu village sequences were actually filmed in Kottakudi village located in Theni district where the film was primarily shot. He created the fictional village fusing images from different places. For the climax portion, producers bought two-acres of land to shoot a scene where elephants destroy the land.

Much of the film was shot in the early mornings and late evenings to get the appropriate texture for the scenes. Solomon added "It is difficult to write a script when you are dependent on Nature. Visuals cannot be written and the scenes would unfold as we go along. This way, I have been able to get the best of both Nature and my artistes." The film was photographed by M. Sukumar who utilised natural lighting for the scenes. The film was completed within 80 working days.

=== Post-production ===
The film underwent an extensive post-production process by July 2012. This involved the climax sequence that featured the battle between two elephants had to be digitally rendered. By November, work on the visual effects and graphics had been completed and the team began working on the re-recording and mixing. The first copy of the film was completed by early-December.

It was reported that the team shot three climaxes for the film; the climax in the theatrical cut showed Manickam's death. Post release, it was reported that the climax would be changed to a happy ending, but this report was dismissed as a rumour while the climax remained unchanged.

== Themes and influences ==
Malathi Rangarajan of The Hindu compared the film's similarities to Nalla Neram (1972) and Annai Oru Aalayam (1979) in terms of the protagonist's relationship with elephants.

== Music ==
The soundtrack album and background score were composed by D. Imman, in his third collaboration with Prabhu Solomon after Lee (2007) and Mynaa. The audio launch was held on 26 July 2012, and the album was released under the Sony Music India label.

== Release ==
Kumki was one of three films along with Vettai and Vazhakku Enn 18/9 set to be distributed by UTV Motion Pictures as a part of their three-film deal with Thirrupathi Brothers. However, the company backed out at the last minute even though they had distributed the other two films, due to reasons unknown, resulting in the film's distribution rights being transferred to K. E. Gnanavel Raja's Studio Green. The film was initially scheduled to be released on Diwali (13 November 2012), but was delayed due to incomplete post-production works and the release of higher profile films including Thuppakki and Podaa Podi.

The following month, it was announced that the film would be released on 14 December 2012, thereby clashing with Neethaane En Ponvasantham. By early December, the film was cleared for release by the Central Board of Film Certification. Two days before the release, the advanced bookings for Kumki and Neethaane En Ponvasantham were sold out for the first weekend. The film was dubbed in Telugu as Gajaraju, and was planned to be released on the same date; it was released a week later.

== Reception ==
=== Critical response ===
Kumki received critical acclaim. Malathi Rangarajan of The Hindu praised the performances of Vikram and Menon, noting that while Vikram "makes an impact with effective underplay", Menon showed "apt expressions"; she found Ramaiah's dialogues to be a bit "contrived" after a certain point of time. N. Venkateswaran of The Times of India gave 3.5 out of 5 to the film and stated "Prabu Solomon's ode to love in the times of elephant attacks, holds a lot of promise but sadly flatters only to deceive." Pavithra Srinivasan of Rediff.com gave 3.5 out of 5 and stated "Kumki is an unforgettable ride through the wilds of Tamil Nadu's virgin forests." IANS gave the film 3.5 out of 5 and summarised that "Kumki may not be the year's best film, but definitely can't be looked down upon."

Sify gave three stars for the film and wrote "At the end of the day, Kumki is a neat entertainer, but not in the same class as the director's earlier Mynaa. You may argue that you've seen better films than Kumki, but try remembering the last time you enjoyed the movie-going experience so much." Malini Mannath of The New Indian Express praised Vikram's performance, adding that "[Vikram] fits in aptly, his rugged look suiting the role of the rural youth, sharing a deep bonding with his elephant" but besides being "more comfortable in expressing intense emotions, he, however, seems stiff and inhibited in the romantic interludes and song-dance numbers"; she added that the film "offers no refreshing visuals" as it was reminiscent of Solomon's Mynaa and felt the climax "falls flat" calling it a "tame affair". Ananda Vikatan rated the film 45 out of 100.

=== Box office ===
Kumki opened in 1000 screens worldwide with 300 screens in Tamil Nadu. At the domestic box office, the film earned around ₹3.63 crore (equivalent to ₹7.5 crore or US$800,000 in 2026) in the first day and ₹3.25 crore (equivalent to ₹6.7 crore or US$710,000 in 2026), thereby making the total collections for two days accounting to ₹6.88 crore (equivalent to ₹14 crore or US$1.5 million in 2026). Within three days, the film grossed around ₹8.51 crore (equivalent to ₹18 crore or US$1.9 million in 2026), and was considered highly successful by trade analysts within a week of its release. Trade analyst Sreedhar Pillai noted that the film earned around ₹14.5 crore (equivalent to ₹30 crore or US$3.2 million in 2026) in Tamil Nadu. In an article for Sify dated 24 December, he claimed that Kumki was already a success based on return on investment, and believed the film's successful run would continue through January 2013.

Owing to the positive reception, Studio Green expanded the film's release to more than 400 screens during the Christmas weekend, preferring main screens in multiplexes across Chennai, Chengalpattu and Coimbatore. At the Chennai box office, the film opened at the second position as Neethaane En Ponvasantham occupying multiplexes in urban centres. But owing to positive word of mouth, the film topped the first position and remained there for two consecutive weeks. Sify noted that the film collected around ₹4.05 crore (equivalent to ₹8.3 crore or US$890,000 in 2026) at the Chennai box office within 10 days of its release, thereby outperforming the newer releases.

== Accolades ==
Award	Date of ceremony (Note: Date is linked to the article about the awards held that year, wherever possible.)	Category	Recipient(s) and nominee(s)	Result	Ref.
Ananda Vikatan Cinema Awards	16 January 2013	Best Music Director	D. Imman	Won	
Ananda Vikatan Cinema Awards	16 January 2013	Best Playback Singer – Female	Magizhini Manimaaran for "Soi Soi"	Won	
Ananda Vikatan Cinema Awards	16 January 2013	Best Lyricist	Yugabharathi	Won	
The Chennai Times Film Awards	4 November 2013	Best Music Director	D. Imman	Nominated	
The Chennai Times Film Awards	4 November 2013	Best Singer – Male	Haricharan for "Ayayayo Aananthamey"	Won	
The Chennai Times Film Awards	4 November 2013	Best Singer – Female	Magizhini Manimaaran for "Soi Soi"	Nominated	
Edison Awards	10 February 2013	Best Director	Prabhu Solomon	Won	
Edison Awards	10 February 2013	Best Music Director	D. Imman	Won	
Edison Awards	10 February 2013	Best Folk Song	"Soi Soi"	Won	
Filmfare Awards South	20 July 2013	Best Film – Tamil	N. Lingusamy, N. Subhash Chandrabose	Nominated	
Filmfare Awards South	20 July 2013	Best Director – Tamil	Prabhu Solomon	Nominated	
Filmfare Awards South	20 July 2013	Best Actress – Tamil	Lakshmi Menon	Nominated	
Filmfare Awards South	20 July 2013	Best Supporting Actor – Tamil	Thambi Ramaiah	Won	
Filmfare Awards South	20 July 2013	Best Music Director – Tamil	D. Imman	Won	
Filmfare Awards South	20 July 2013	Best Lyricist – Tamil	Yugabharathi for "Solitaley"	Won	
Filmfare Awards South	20 July 2013	Best Male Playback Singer – Tamil	D. Imman for "Onnum Puriyale"	Nominated	
Filmfare Awards South	20 July 2013	Best Female Playback Singer – Tamil	Shreya Ghoshal for "Solitaley"	Nominated	
Mirchi Music Awards South	26 August 2013	Song of the Year	"Ayayayo Aananthamey"	Won	
Mirchi Music Awards South	26 August 2013	Song of the Year	"Solitaley"	Nominated	
Mirchi Music Awards South	26 August 2013	Album of the Year	D. Imman	Won	
Mirchi Music Awards South	26 August 2013	Male Vocalist of the Year	Haricharan for "Ayayayo Aananthamey"	Nominated	
Mirchi Music Awards South	26 August 2013	Music Composer of the Year	D. Imman for "A Lady and the Violin"	Nominated	
Mirchi Music Awards South	26 August 2013	Music Composer of the Year	D. Imman for "Solitaley"	Won	
Mirchi Music Awards South	26 August 2013	Lyricist of the Year	Yugabharathi for "Ayayayo Aananthamey"	Nominated	
Mirchi Music Awards South	26 August 2013	Upcoming Female Vocalist of the Year	Magizhini Manimaaran for "Soi Soi"	Nominated	
Mirchi Music Awards South	26 August 2013	Mannin Kural Male Vocalist of the Year	Alphons Joseph for "Nee Yeppo Pulla"	Nominated	
Mirchi Music Awards South	26 August 2013	Mannin Kural Female Vocalist of the Year	Magizhini Manimaaran for "Soi Soi"	Won	
Mirchi Music Awards South	26 August 2013	Song of the Year – Listener's choice	"Solitaley"	Won	
Mirchi Music Awards South	26 August 2013	Technical – Sound Mixing of the Year	"Yella Oorum"	Nominated	
Norway Tamil Film Festival Awards	24–28 April 2013	Best Director	Prabhu Solomon	Won	
Norway Tamil Film Festival Awards	24–28 April 2013	Best Actress	Lakshmi Menon	Won	
Norway Tamil Film Festival Awards	24–28 April 2013	Best Music Director	D. Imman	Won	
South Indian International Movie Awards	12–13 September 2013	Best Film – Tamil	N. Lingusamy, N. Subhash Chandrabose	Won	
South Indian International Movie Awards	12–13 September 2013	Best Director – Tamil	Prabhu Solomon	Nominated	
South Indian International Movie Awards	12–13 September 2013	Best Cinematographer – Tamil	Sukumar	Won	
South Indian International Movie Awards	12–13 September 2013	Best Comedian – Tamil	Thambi Ramaiah	Won	
South Indian International Movie Awards	12–13 September 2013	Best Music Director – Tamil	D. Imman	Nominated	
South Indian International Movie Awards	12–13 September 2013	Best Lyricist – Tamil	Yugabharathi for "Solitaley"	Nominated	
South Indian International Movie Awards	12–13 September 2013	Best Male Playback Singer – Tamil	Haricharan for "Ayayayo Aananthamey"	Nominated	
South Indian International Movie Awards	12–13 September 2013	Best Female Playback Singer – Tamil	Shreya Ghoshal for "Solitaley"	Nominated	
South Indian International Movie Awards	12–13 September 2013	Best Dance Choreographer – Tamil	Noble for "Ayyayayo Aananthamey"	Nominated	
South Indian International Movie Awards	12–13 September 2013	Best Male Debutant – Tamil	Vikram Prabhu	Won	
Tamil Nadu State Film Awards	13 July 2017	Special Prize (Best Film)	N. Lingusamy, N. Subhash Chandrabose	Won	
Tamil Nadu State Film Awards	13 July 2017	Special Prize (Best Actor)	Vikram Prabhu	Won	
Tamil Nadu State Film Awards	13 July 2017	Best Actress	Lakshmi Menon (Note: Also for Sundarapandian.)	Won	
Tamil Nadu State Film Awards	13 July 2017	Best Music Director	D. Imman	Won	
Tamil Nadu State Film Awards	13 July 2017	Best Male Playback Singer	Ranjith for "Solitaley"	Won	
Tamil Nadu State Film Awards	13 July 2017	Best Female Playback Singer	Shreya Ghoshal for "Solitaley"	Won	
Tamil Nadu State Film Awards	13 July 2017	Best Cinematographer	M. Sukumar	Won	
Vijay Awards	11 May 2013	Best Director	Prabhu Solomon	Nominated	
Vijay Awards	11 May 2013	Best Debut Actor	Vikram Prabhu	Won	
Vijay Awards	11 May 2013	Best Music Director	D. Imman	Won	
Vijay Awards	11 May 2013	Best Art Director	Vairabalan	Nominated	
Vijay Awards	11 May 2013	Best Male Playback Singer	Haricharan for "Ayayayo Aananthamey"	Nominated	
Vijay Awards	11 May 2013	Best Lyricist	Yugabharathi for "Solitaley"	Nominated	
Vijay Awards	11 May 2013	Best Dialogue	Prabhu Solomon	Nominated	
Vijay Awards	11 May 2013	Best Costume Designer	Ganesh	Nominated	
Vijay Awards	11 May 2013	Face of the Year	Vikram Prabhu	Nominated	
Vijay Awards	11 May 2013	Favourite Song	"Solitaley"	Nominated'	

== Legacy ==
Kumki emerged a breakthrough for Vikram Prabhu and Lakshmi Menon; the latter became a leading actress in Tamil cinema with the success of this film and Sundarapandian, and went to feature in notable Tamil films such as Pandiya Naadu (2013), Jigarthanda (2014) and Vedalam (2015). Both Vikram and Menon paired again for the 2021 film Pulikkuthi Pandi. Ashvin Raja who garnered attention for his role in Kumki, was thereafter known as Kumki Ashwin. The comedy sequence featuring Thambi Ramaiah's character Kothalli also became popular after the film's release.

== In other media ==
In Thalaivan (2014), Kannan (Santhanam) will only give medicine to old people if the nurse says "I love you". Mistakenly thinking that the nurse is actually in love with him, the song "Solitaley" plays in the background. The song "Ayyayayo Aananthamey" was parodied in Vallavanukku Pullum Aayudham (2014) when Sakthi's bicycle (voiced by G. Gnanasambandan) was driven by a man who weighs more than 100 kilograms (220 lb) which the cycle cannot handle. Vivek also parodied the song in Vai Raja Vai (2015), in a scene where he tells M. S. Bhaskar that he participated in Super Singer and sang this song in a loud, bass voice for a comedy. The song "Soi Soi" was reused in the Marathi film Carry On Maratha (2015) as "Yuvarani (Soi Soi)", with new lyrics by Kashmira Kulkarni. The phrase "Nooru Kodi Vaanavil" from the song "Ayyayayoo Aananthamey", was used for a 2026 film, which also stars Thambi Ramaiah.

== Future ==
A spiritual successor Kumki 2, also directed by Solomon, was released in 2025.
