= List of Ramsar sites in India =

Wetlands in India as per Ramsar list

There are 103 Ramsar sites covering 1,387,981 hectares (13,879.81 km^{2}) in India, as of 16 October 2026. These wetlands are deemed of international importance under the Ramsar Convention. For a full list of all Ramsar sites worldwide, see the list of Ramsar wetlands of international importance.

Tamil Nadu has the highest number of Ramsar sites in India. It has 20 protected wetlands covering 1008.81 km^{2}. West Bengal protects the largest total area of wetlands, covering 435,500 hectares. India started protecting these sites in 1981. Chilika Lake in Odisha and Keoladeo National Park in Rajasthan were the very first sites to join the list on 1 October 1981. The newest additions are Uttar Pradesh's Sauj Jheel and Chandigarh's Sukhna Lake marked as the nation's 102nd and 103rd sites on 15 October 2026. The Sunderban Wetland in West Bengal is the single largest site in India, covering a huge area of 423,000 hectares. On the other hand, India has two smallest sites that are tied at just 20 hectares each. These are the Renuka Wetland in Himachal Pradesh and the Vembannur Wetland Complex in Tamil Nadu. Two sites in India are explicitly marked with the Montreux Record (MR) abbreviation, signifying areas where ecological changes have occurred, are occurring, or are likely to occur. These are Keoladeo National Park in Rajasthan and Loktak Lake in Manipur.

Lonar Lake in Maharashtra is incredibly unique because it was created by a meteorite hitting the Earth. Loktak Lake in Manipur is famous for hosting the world's only floating national park - the Keibul Lamjao National Park, which sits right on top of the water. Vembanad-Kol Wetland in Kerala is celebrated as the longest lake in the entire country. The Nalsarovar Bird Sanctuary in Gujarat is a massive lifesaver for a rare, endangered animal called the Indian wild ass.

According to the Wetlands (Conservation and Management) Rules of 2017, the Government of India's definition of wetlands does not include river channels, paddy fields, or other areas utilized for commercial activities.

According to WWF-India, wetlands are one of the most threatened of all ecosystems in India. Loss of vegetation, salinization, excessive inundation, water pollution, invasive species, excessive development and road building, have seriously impacted many of the country's wetlands. With gradual rise in awareness and environmental consciousness, Ramsar sites are these days viewed as the nation's achievements in nature conservation, and as per strict rules of the Ramsar Convention, once a wetland is declared as a Ramsar site, it gets prioritized as a highly sensitive nature and no-development zone with a sharp focus on conservation and preservation of flora and fauna species.

India has the highest number of Ramsar sites in all of Asia. On a global scale, the nation ranks third in the world for the most protected wetlands, sitting just behind the United Kingdom and Mexico.

== Ramsar sites by state ==
As of October 2026.

State/UT	No. of sites	Name of site
Andhra Pradesh	1	Kolleru Lake
Arunachal Pradesh	1	Glaw Lake
Assam	1	Deepor Beel
Chandigarh	1	Sukhna Lake
Chhattisgarh	1	Kopra Reservoir
Bihar	6	Gogabeel Lake, Gokul Reservoir, Kanwar Lake, Nagi Bird Sanctuary, Nakti lake, Udaypur Lake
Goa	1	Nanda Lake
Gujarat	5	Chhari-Dhand, Khijadiya, Nalsarovar, Thol Lake, Wadhvana Wetland
Haryana	2	Sultanpur National Park, Bhindawas Wildlife Sanctuary
Himachal Pradesh	3	Chandra Taal, Pong Dam Lake Wildlife Sanctuary, Renuka Lake
Jammu and Kashmir	5	Hokersar Wetland, Hygam Wetland Conservation Reserve, Shallabugh Wetland, Mansar-Surinsar Wildlife Sanctuary, Wular Lake
Jharkhand	1	Udhwa Lake
Karnataka	4	Ranganathittu Bird Sanctuary, Ankasamudra Bird Conservation Reserve, Aghanashini Estuary, Magadi Kere Conservation Reserve
Kerala	3	Ashtamudi Wetland, Sasthamkotta Lake, Vembanad-Kol Wetland
Ladakh	2	Tso Kar, Tsomoriri Lake
Madhya Pradesh	5	Bhoj Wetland, Sakhya Sagar, Sirpur Lake, Yashwant Sagar, Tawa Reservoir
Maharashtra	3	Lonar Lake, Nandur Madhameshwar, Thane Creek
Manipur	1	Loktak Lake
Mizoram	1	Pala Wetland
Odisha	6	Ansupa Lake, Bhitarkanika Mangroves, Chilika Lake, Hirakud Reservoir, Satkosia Gorge, Tampara Lake
Punjab	6	Beas Conservation Reserve, Harike Wetland, Kanjli Wetland, Keshopur-Miani Community Reserve, Nangal Wildlife Sanctuary, Ropar Wetland
Rajasthan	5	Keoladeo National Park, Sambhar Lake, Khichan Wetland, Menar Wetland Complex, Silisereh Lake
Sikkim	1	Khecheopalri Wetland
Tamil Nadu	20	Chitrangudi Bird Sanctuary, Gulf of Mannar Marine Biosphere Reserve, Kanjirankulam Bird Sanctuary, Karaivetti Bird Sanctuary, Karikili Bird Sanctuary, Koonthankulam Bird Sanctuary, Longwood Shola Reserve Forest, Pallikarnai Marsh Reserve Forest, Pichavaram Mangrove, Point Calimere Wildlife and Bird Sanctuary, Suchindram Theroor Wetland Complex, Udhayamarthandapuram Bird Sanctuary, Vadavur Bird Sanctuary, Vedanthangal Bird Sanctuary, Vellode Bird Sanctuary, Vembannur Wetland Complex, Nanjarayan Bird Sanctuary, Kazhuveli Bird Sanctuary, Sakkarakottai Bird Sanctuary, Therthangal Bird Sanctuary
Tripura	1	Rudrasagar Lake
Uttar Pradesh	14	Patna Bird Sanctuary, Bakhira Sanctuary, Haiderpur Wetland, Nawabganj Bird Sanctuary, Parvati Arga Bird Sanctuary, Saman Bird Sanctuary, Samaspur Bird Sanctuary, Sandi Bird Sanctuary, Sarsai Nawar Jheel, Sur Sarovar, Upper Ganga River, Shekha Jheel Bird Sanctuary, Jai Prakash Narayan Bird Sanctuary (Surha Tal), Sauj Jheel
Uttarakhand	1	Asan Barrage
West Bengal	2	East Kolkata Wetlands, Sundarban Wetland
Total	103	–

== List of sites ==
(as of October 2026)

	Name	Location	Designated	Area (km^{2})	Description	Image
1	Kolleru Lake	Andhra Pradesh	19 August 2002	901		
2	Deepor Beel	Assam	19 August 2002	30		
3	Kanwar Taal or Kabar Taal Lake	Bihar	21 July 2020	26.2	Also known as Kanwar Jheel, it covers 2,620 hectares of the Indo-Gangetic Plain. The site is one of 18 wetlands within an extensive floodplain complex; it floods during the monsoon season to a depth of 1.5 metres. This absorption of floodwaters is a vital service in Bihar where 70% of the land is vulnerable to inundation. During the dry season, areas of marshland dry out and are used for agriculture. Significant biodiversity is present, with 165 plant species and 394 animal species recorded, including 221 bird species. The wetland is an important stopover along the Central Asian Flyway, with 58 migratory waterbirds using it to rest and refuel. It is also a valuable site for fish biodiversity with over 50 species documented. Five critically endangered species inhabit the site, including three vultures – the red-headed vulture (Sarcogyps calvus), white-rumped vulture (Gyps bengalensis) and Indian vulture (Gyps indicus) – and two waterbirds, the sociable lapwing (Vanellus gregarious) and Baer's pochard (Aythya baeri). Major threats to the site include water management activities such as drainage, water abstraction, damming, and canalization.	
4	Nanda Lake	Goa	8 June 2022	0.42	Nanda Lake is located in Curchorem district of Goa. Nanda Lake comprises intermittent freshwater marshes that lie adjacent to one of the major tributaries of the Zuari river.This wetland supports a wide variety of migratory waterbirds and many other important plants and animals	
5	Thol Lake	Gujarat	5 April 2021	6.99	It is located in Mehsana district of Gujarat. It is a shallow freshwater reservoir and a predominantly open water area. It is a man-made wetland, that was originally constructed for irrigation in 1912. It was declared a wildlife sanctuary to protect the birdlife found there in 1988. It is also essential during the dry seasons for a population of blackbuck (Antilope cervicapra) and other mammals in the surrounding area. Emergent and floating aquatic plants are located along the wetland. Some terrestrial trees and herbs such as desi baval, bor, neem, vad, pilu, gando baval, kerdo, etc are also present. It lies on the Central Asian Flyway and more than 320 bird species can be found here. The wetland supports more than 30 threatened waterbird species, such as the critically endangered White-rumped Vulture and Sociable Lapwing, and the vulnerable Sarus Crane, Common Pochard, and Lesser White-fronted Goose.	
6	Wadhvana Wetland	Gujarat	5 April 2021	6.30	It is located in Dabhoi Tehsil (Taluka), Vadodara district, Gujarat. This reservoir was created in 1910 by the former Baroda State (King Gaikwad). It is located in a semi-arid agricultural landscape and it is surrounded by wheat and paddy fields and villages. River Orsang (which joins with the Narmada River at Chandod) flows into the lake. It also provides irrigation to 25 villages. The red-crested pochard (Netta rufina), a duck that is otherwise rare in Western India, is regularly recorded here during winter. It is internationally important for its birdlife as it provides wintering ground to migratory waterbirds, including over 80 species that migrate on the Central Asian Flyway. They include some threatened or near-threatened species such as the endangered Pallas's fish-Eagle, the vulnerable Common Pochard, and the near-threatened Dalmatian Pelican, Grey-headed Fish-eagle, and Ferruginous Duck.	
7	Khijadiya Bird Sanctuary	Gujarat	13 April 2021	5.12	It is a bird sanctuary located in Jamnagar district. About 300 species of migratory birds have been recorded here. The sanctuary is unique having both fresh water lakes, and salt and freshwater marshlands.	
8	Nalsarovar Bird Sanctuary	Gujarat	24 September 2012	120	A natural freshwater lake (a relict sea) that is the largest natural wetland in the Thar Desert Biogeographic Province and represents a dynamic environment with salinity and depth varying depending on rainfall. The area is home to 210 species of birds, with an average of 174,128 individuals recorded there during the winter and 50,000 in the summer. It is an important stopover site within the Central Asian Flyway, with globally threatened species such as the critically endangered sociable lapwing (Vanellus gregarius) and the vulnerable marbled teal (Marmaronetta angustirostris) stopping over at the site during migration, while the vulnerable sarus crane (Grus antigone) takes refuge there during summer when other water bodies are dry. The wetland is also a lifeline for a satellite population of the endangered Indian wild ass (Equus hemionus khur) which uses this area in the dry season. Local communities heavily rely on the lake as it provides them with a source of drinking water and water for irrigation, as well as an important source of income from fishing for catla fish (Labeo catla) and rohu (Labeo rohita). An average of 75,000 tourists visit the wetland annually.	
9	Sultanpur National Park	Haryana	25 May 2021	1.43	It is located in the Gurgaon district of Haryana, 46 km. from Delhi and 15 km. from Gurgaon on the Gurgaon - Farukh Nagar Road. It is essentially a bird watcher's paradise with few trees obscuring the visitor's view of the lake. The birds here can be easily spotted wading, swimming, or flying. The Credit for the discovery of this bird sanctuary goes to a bird lover named Peter Jackson. There is also an ancient lake here. In April 1971, the Sultanpur Jheel inside the park (an area of 1.21 sq. Km.) was accorded Sanctuary status under section 8 of the Punjab Wildlife Preservation Act of 1959. The status of the park was upgraded to National Park under the Wildlife (Protection) Act, 1972 in July 1991. About one hundred species of birds and Siberia countries for reproduction every year in this huge natural lake spread over about 265 acres of land.	
10	Bhindawas Wildlife Sanctuary	Haryana	25 May 2021	4.11	It is a human-made freshwater wetland, located in Jhajjar district, Haryana. It is the largest wetland in Haryana. In 2009, it was declared as a bird sanctuary by Govt. of India. It was constructed to store the excess waters of the Jawaharlal Nehru canal at the time of power failure of the Lift Canal System. It is an important part of the ecological corridor along the route of the Sahibi River which traverses from the Aravalli hills in Rajasthan to the Yamuna. Rainwater, the JLN Feeder canal, and its escape channel are the main sources of water in the bird sanctuary. It shares its border with Khaparwas Wildlife Sanctuary (Haryana). Mammals recorded at the Site include nilgai (Boselaphus tragocamelus), common mongoose (Herpestes edwardsi), and black-naped hare (Lepus nigricollis). Over 250 bird species use the sanctuary throughout the year as a resting and roosting site. The site supports more than ten globally threatened species including the endangered Egyptian Vulture, Steppe Eagle, Pallas's Fish Eagle, and Black-bellied Tern.	
11	Pong Dam Lake	Himachal Pradesh	19 August 2002	156.62	A water storage reservoir created in 1975 on the Beas River in the low foothills of the Himalayas in the northern edge of the Indo-Gangetic Plain. The Ramsar Site Information Sheet notes that "at a time when wetlands in northern India are getting reduced due to extensive drainage and reclamation, the avian habitats formed by the creation of the Pong Dam assume a great significance" - given the site's location on the trans-Himalayan flyway, more than 220 bird species have been identified, with 54 species of waterfowl. Hydrological values include monsoon-season flood prevention, both in the surroundings and downstream due to water regulation, groundwater recharge, silt trapping and prevention of soil erosion; electricity is generated, and irrigation water is being channeled to fertile areas of the deserts of Punjab and Rajasthan. Low-yield subsistence fishing existed prior to impoundment, but since, a lucrative fishery has grown up, with 27 fish species and a yield increasing each year - some 1800 fishermen now have direct employment and 1000 families benefit indirectly. A nature conservation education centre is found on the island of Ransar or Ramsar [sic]. Recent management strategies have shifted away from law enforcement and use restrictions towards more participatory approaches and community awareness, and the site is well suited to community-based ecotourism.	
12	Chandra Taal	Himachal Pradesh; 32°29′N 77°36′E	8 November 2005	0.49		
13	Renuka Lake	Himachal Pradesh	8 November 2005	0.2	A natural wetland with freshwater springs and inland subterranean karst formations, fed by a small stream flowing from the lower Himalayas out to the Giri river. The lake is home to at least 443 species of fauna and 19 species of fish representative of lake ecosystems like Puntius, Labeo, Rasbora and Channa. Prominent vegetation ranges from dry deciduous plants like Shorea robusta, Terminalia elliptica, Dalbergia sissoo to aquatic plants. There are 103 species of birds of which 66 are resident, e.g. crimson-breasted barbets, mynas, bulbuls, pheasants, egrets, herons, mallards and lapwings. Among ungulates, sambar, barking deer and ghorals are also abundant in the area. The lake has high religious significance and is named after Renuka, the mother of Hindu sage Parshuram, and is thus visited by thousands of pilgrims and tourists. Conservation measures so far include community awareness, and prevention of silt influx from eroded slopes and 50 ha of planting in the catchment. The site is managed by the Shimla Forest Department, Himachal Pradesh	
14	Ashtamudi Wetland	Kerala; 8°57′N 76°35′E	18 August 2002	61.4	A natural backwater in Kollam district, Kerala. The rivers Kallada and Pallichal drain into it. It forms an estuary with the sea at Neendakara which is a famous fishing harbour. National Waterway 3 passes through it. The tastiest backwater fish in Kerala, the karimeen of Kanjiracode Kayal is from Ashtamudi Lake.	
15	Loktak Lake	Manipur	23 March 1990	266	The largest freshwater lake in the north-eastern region of the country, which is famous for the phumdis (heterogeneous mass of vegetation, soil, and organic matters at various stages of decomposition) floating over it. Keibul Lamjao, the only floating national park in the world, floats over it. It is located near Moirang, Bishnupur district. The etymology of Loktak is lok = "stream" and tak = "the end". The Keibul Lamjao National Park, which is the last natural refuge of the endangered sangai or Manipur brow-antlered deer (Cervus eldi eldi), one of three subspecies of Eld's deer, covering an area of 40 km^{2} (15 sq mi), is situated in the southeastern shores of this lake and is the largest of all the phumdis in the lake. This place is a global tourist destination. The Sendra tourist hub (a small hillock) is located at Moirang ~58 km from the heart of the city.	
16	East Kolkata Wetlands	West Bengal	19 August 2002	125	World-renowned as a model of a multiple-use wetland, the site's resource recovery systems, developed by local people through the ages, have saved the city of Kolkata from the costs of constructing and maintaining waste water treatment plants. The wetland forms an urban facility for treating the city's wastewater and utilizing the treated water for pisciculture and agriculture, through the recovery of nutrients in an efficient manner - the water flows through fish ponds covering about 4,000 ha, and the ponds act as solar reactors and complete most of their biochemical reactions with the help of solar energy. Thus the system is described as "one of the rare examples of environmental protection and development management where a complex ecological process has been adopted by the local farmers for mastering the resource recovery activities" (Kundu et al., 2008). The wetland provides about 150 tons of fresh vegetables daily, as well as some 10,500 tons of table fish per year, the latter providing livelihoods for about 50,000 people directly and as many again indirectly. The fish ponds are mostly operated by worker cooperatives, in some cases in legal associations and in others in cooperative groups whose tenurial rights are under legal challenge. A potential threat is seen in the recent unauthorized use of the wastewater outfall channels by industries that add metals to the canal sludge and threaten the edible quality of the fish and vegetables.	
17	Nandur Madhameshwar	Maharashtra	21 June 2019	14	The site is a mosaic of lakes, marshes and riparian forest on the Deccan Plateau. Construction of the Nandur Madhameshwar Weir at the confluence of the Godavari and Kadva rivers helped create a thriving wetland: originally designed to overcome water shortages in the surrounding area, the site now also serves as a buffer against floodwaters and as a biodiversity hotspot. With 536 species recorded, its diverse habitats contrast with the surrounding semi-arid conditions caused by the rain shadow of the Western Ghats mountain range. The site hosts some of India's most iconic species, such as the leopard and Indian sandalwood (Santalum album). It also provides sanctuary to critically endangered species including Deolali minnow (Parapsilorhynchus prateri), Indian vulture (Gyps indicus) and white-rumped vulture (Gyps bengalensis). Invasive species including common water hyacinth (Eichhornia crassipes) threaten the site, along with the effects of urban development and water abstraction. The Office of the Conservator of Forests (Wildlife) manages the site.	
18	Nangal Wildlife Sanctuary	Punjab	26 September 2019	1.16	Located in the Sivalik Hills of Punjab, the sanctuary supports abundant flora and fauna including threatened species, such as the endangered Indian pangolin (Manis crassicaudata) and Egyptian vulture (Neophron percnopterus) and the vulnerable leopard (Panthera pardus). It occupies a human-made reservoir constructed as part of the Bhakra-Nangal Project in 1961. The site is of historic importance as the Indian and Chinese prime ministers formalized the Five Principles of Peaceful Coexistence there in 1954. More than half a million people downstream benefit from the reservoir as the flow of water is regulated, reducing the risks to both people and property from floods. The Department of Forest and Wildlife (Rupnagar Wildlife Division), Punjab is responsible for managing the sanctuary.	
19	Nawabganj Bird Sanctuary	Uttar Pradesh	19 September 2019	2.25	A shallow marshland 45 kilometres from Lucknow in Uttar Pradesh. Monsoon rains feed this diverse wetland while the Sarda Canal supplies additional water. The sanctuary supports recreation and tourism activities as well as local biodiversity. It is a haven for birds, with 25,000 waterbirds regularly recorded and 220 resident and migratory species documented. Among these are globally threatened species including the endangered Egyptian vulture (Neophron percnopterus) and Pallas's fish eagle (Haliaeetus leucoryphus) as well as the vulnerable lesser adjutant (Leptoptilos javanicus) and woolly-necked stork (Ciconia episcopus). Protection and afforestation measures have helped increase the overall diversity of wildlife, with golden jackal (Canis aureus) and jungle cat (Felis chaus) now present. The highly invasive common water hyacinth (Eichhornia crassipes) poses a threat, as does the removal of timber from the forests. State forest officers along with the Office of the Conservator of Forest (Wildlife) jointly manage the sanctuary.	
20	Parvati Arga Bird Sanctuary	Uttar Pradesh	2 December 2019	7.22	A permanent freshwater environment consisting of two oxbow lakes. These wetlands are characteristic of Uttar Pradesh and offer exceptional habitats for waterbirds, providing both roosting and breeding sites with over 100,000 birds documented in annual counts. The sanctuary is a refuge for some of India's threatened vulture species; the critically endangered white-rumped vulture (Gyps bengalensis) and Indian vulture (Gyps indicus), and the endangered Egyptian vulture (Neophron percnopterus) have all been recorded. It is also critical in the maintenance of hydrological regimes, ensuring groundwater recharge and discharge. Meanwhile, ancient temples around the lakes provide religious significance and encourage tourism. Invasive species such as the common water hyacinth (Eichhornia crassipes) along with the development of roads and railways present significant threats. The Uttar Pradesh divisional forest officer and chief conservator of forests along with sanctuary officers share management duties.	
21	Point Calimere Wildlife and Bird Sanctuary	Tamil Nadu	19 August 2002	385	A coastal area consisting of shallow waters, shores, long sand bars, intertidal flats, and intertidal forests, chiefly mangrove, and seasonal, often-saline lagoons, as well as human-made salt exploitation sites. Some 257 species of birds have been recorded, 119 of them waterbirds, including the vulnerable species spoon-billed sandpiper (Calidris pygmaea) and grey pelican (Pelecanus philippensis) and some 30,000 greater and lesser flamingos. The site serves as the breeding ground or nursery for many commercially important species of fish, as well as for prawns and crabs. Some 35,000 fishermen and agriculturalists support their families around the borders of the sanctuary. Illegal collection of firewood and forest produce such as fruits (gathered by lopping off tree branches), the spread of Chilean mesquite (Prosopis chilensis), increasingly brackish groundwater caused by expansion of the historical salt works, and decreasing inflow of freshwater are all seen as potential causes for concern. Visitors come to the site both for recreation and for pilgrimage, as it is associated with Lord Rama.	
22	Keshopur-Miani Community Reserve	Punjab	26 September 2019	3.44		
23	Keoladeo National Park	Rajasthan	1 October 1981	28.73	It became the first Ramsar site along with Chilka Lake	
24	Ropar Wetland	Punjab	22 January 2002	13.65	A humanmade wetland of lake and river formed by the 1952 construction of a barrage for diversion of water from the Sutlej River for drinking and irrigation. The site is an important breeding place for the nationally protected smooth-coated otter, hog deer, sambar, several reptiles, and the endangered Indian pangolin (Manis crassicaudata). Some 35 species of fish play an important role in the food chain, and about 150 species of local and migratory birds are supported. Local fisheries are economically significant, and wheat, rice, sugar cane, and sorghum are cultivated in the surrounding area. Deforested local hills leading to siltation, and increasing industrialization causing an inflow of pollutants, are potential threats, and invasive weeds are a further cause for concern. Nature lovers, birdwatchers, swimmers and boaters visit the site in considerable numbers.	
25	Rudrasagar Lake	Tripura	8 November 2005	2.4	A lowland sedimentation reservoir in the northeast hills, fed by three perennial streams discharging to the Gumti River. The lake is abundant in commercially important freshwater fish genera like Botia, Notopterus, Chitala, Mystus and the species Ompok pabda, Labeo bata, and freshwater scampi, with annual production of 26 metric tons, and an ideal habitat for IUCN Red Listed three-striped roofed turtle (Batagur dhongoka). Owing to high rainfall (2500 mm) and downstream topography, the wetland is regularly flooded with 4-5 times the annual peak, assisting in groundwater recharge. Aquatic weeds are composed of rare marginal-floating-emergent-submerged weeds. Lands are owned by the state with perennial water areas leased out to the subsistence fishermens' cooperative, and surrounding seasonal waterbodies are cultivated for paddy. The main threats are increasing silt loads due to deforestation, expansion of agricultural land and intensive farming, and land conversion to population pressure. Vijayadashami, one of the most important Hindu festivals with various sports events, attracts at least 50,000 tourists and devotees every year.	
26	Saman Bird Sanctuary	Uttar Pradesh	2 December 2019	5.26	A seasonal oxbow lake on the Ganges floodplain. It is heavily reliant on the arrival of the south-westerly monsoon in July and August, which provides the vast majority of annual rainfall. The sanctuary regularly provides refuge to over 50,000 waterbirds (187 species have been recorded) and is particularly important as a wintering site for many migrants including the greylag goose (Anser anser), with over 1% of the South Asian population present during winter. Vulnerable species including the sarus crane (Grus antigone) and greater spotted eagle (Aquila clanga) are also found. Ecosystem services provided include the supply of fresh water for agriculture, as well as recreation, and nature-based tourism based on the huge diversity of birds. Settlement encroachment and salinization present threats. The Office of the Conservator of Forest (Wildlife) oversees the site's management.	
27	Samaspur Bird Sanctuary	Uttar Pradesh	3 October 2019	8	A perennial lowland marsh typical of the Indo-Gangetic Plain in Raebareli district. Its six connected lakes are heavily relevant to monsoon rains. Annual counts regularly find more than 75,000 birds present, with over 250 resident and migrant species documented. The sanctuary harbours threatened species such as the endangered Egyptian vulture (Neophron percnopterus) and Pallas's fish eagle (Haliaeetus leucoryphus), and more than 1% of the South Asian population of the vulnerable common pochard (Aythya ferina). At least 46 freshwater fish species use the wetland, with some migrating in from nearby rivers during monsoon floods. The site provides food products and agricultural fodder, as well as maintains biodiversity. However, invasive species threaten its ecological character, with over 40% of documented floral species being exotic. The Office of the Conservator of Forests (Wildlife) and state forest officers undertake joint management of the sanctuary.	
28	Sambhar Lake	Rajasthan	23 March 1990	240	India's largest inland salt lake, it is a key wintering area for tens of thousands of flamingos and other birds that migrate from northern Asia. The specialized algae and bacteria growing in the lake provide striking water colours and support the lake ecology that, in turn, sustains the migrating waterfowl. There is other wildlife in the nearby forests, where nilgai move freely along with deer and foxes.	
29	Sandi Bird Sanctuary	Uttar Pradesh	26 September 2019	3	A freshwater marsh in the Hardoi district, the wetland is typical of the Indo-Gangetic Plain and receives most of its water from monsoon rains. Rich in aquatic plants, the site provides a productive habitat for waterfowl with over 40,000 individuals counted in 2018. It is home to over 1% of the South Asian populations of common teal (Anas crecca), red-crested pochard (Netta rufina) and ferruginous duck (Aythya nyroca), while the vulnerable sarus crane (Grus antigone) has a population of 200 individuals within the sanctuary. These figures justify its designation as an Important Bird Area by BirdLife International. The wetland is a popular recreational and tourism destination and supports farmers as a source of livestock fodder. Drought presents a threat; the sanctuary dried out leading to a subsequent collapse in waterbird populations from 2014 to 2015. The Office of the Conservator of Forests manages the site in conjunction with local forest and wildlife officers.	
30	Sarsai Nawar Jheel	Uttar Pradesh	19 September 2019	1.61	A permanent marsh in the Etawah district, this typical wetland of the Indo-Gangetic Plain is fed by the southwest monsoon rains. It is an example of co-habitation of humans and wildlife; farming practices across most of the sites play important roles in sustaining the waterbird habitats. A particular beneficiary is the vulnerable sarus crane (Grus antigone), with a population of 400 individuals making up the largest flock in the region. The site's name is derived from this large non-migratory crane. Other threatened species present include the critically endangered white-rumped vulture (Gyps bengalensis) and endangered woolly-necked stork (Ciconia episcopus). The wetland is also a site of spiritual and religious significance with the nearby Hajari Mahadev Temple visited by thousands of pilgrims each year. Droughts along with drainage have the potential to threaten the site's ecological character. It is recognized by BirdLife International as an Important Bird Area.	
31	Sasthamkotta Lake	Kerala	19 August 2002	3.73	Situated in Kollam district, it is the largest freshwater lake in Kerala. The Kallada River had a unique replenishing system through a bar of paddy field which has now disappeared due to indiscriminate clay and sand mining. The lake is now depleting due to the destruction of its replenishing mechanism.	
32	Haiderpur Wetland	Uttar Pradesh	13 April 2021	69.08	This human-made wetland was formed in 1984 by the construction of the Madhya Ganga Barrage on a floodplain of the River Ganga. It is located within the boundaries of Hastinapur Wildlife Sanctuary.	
33	Sundarban Wetland	West Bengal	30 January 2019	4230	Located within the largest mangrove forest in the world, it encompasses hundreds of islands and a maze of rivers, rivulets and creeks in the delta of the rivers Ganges and Brahmaputra on the Bay of Bengal. The Indian Sundarban, covering the south-westernmost part of the delta, constitutes over 60% of the country's total mangrove forest and includes 90% of Indian mangrove species. The mangrove forests protect the hinterland from storms, cyclones, tidal surges, and the seepage and intrusion of saltwater inland and into waterways. They serve as nurseries to shellfish and finfish and sustain the fisheries of the entire eastern coast.	
34	Surinsar-Mansar Lakes	Jammu and Kashmir	8 November 2005	3.5	A freshwater composite lake in semi-arid Jammu Region, adjoining the Jhelum Basin with the catchment of sandy conglomeratic soil, boulders, and pebbles. Surinsar is rain-fed without permanent discharge, and Mansar is primarily fed by surface run-off and partially by mineralised water through paddy fields, with inflow increasing in the rainy season. The lake supports CITES and IUCN Red Listed Indian flapshell turtle (Lissemys punctata), Indian softshell turtle (Aspideretes gangeticus) and Mansariella lacustris. This composite lake is high in micronutrients for which it is an attractive habitat, breeding and nursery ground for migratory waterfowl like the Eurasian coot (Fulica atra), common moorhen (Gallinula chloropus), black-necked grebe (Podiceps nigricollis), tufted duck (Aythya fuligula), and various Anas species. The site is socially and culturally very important with many temples owing to its mythical origin from the Mahabharata period. Although the lakes support a variety of fishes, fishing is discouraged for religious reasons. The main threats are increasing visitors, agricultural runoff, bathing, and cremation rituals. Conservation is focused on raising awareness.	
35	Tsomoriri	Ladakh	19 August 2002	120	A freshwater to brackish lake lying at 4,595 m above sea level, with wet meadows and borax-laden wetlands along the shores. The site is said to represent the only breeding ground outside of China for one of the most endangered cranes, the black-necked crane (Grus nigricollis), and the only breeding ground for bar-headed geese in India. The great Tibetan sheep or argali (Ovis ammon hodgsoni) and Tibetan wild ass (Equus kiang) are endemic to the Tibetan Plateau, of which the Changtang is the westernmost part. The barley fields at Karzok have been described as the highest cultivated land in the world. With no outflow, evaporation in the arid steppe conditions causes varying levels of salinity. Ancient trade routes and now major trekking routes pass the site. The 400-year-old Korzok Monastery attracts many tourists, and the wetland is considered sacred by local Buddhist communities and the water is not used by them. The local community dedicated Tsomoriri as a WWF "Sacred Gift for a Living Planet" in recognition of WWF-India's work there. The rapidly growing attraction of the recently opened area to Western tourists (currently 2,500 per summer) as an "unspoilt destination" with pristine high desert landscapes and lively cultural traditions brings great promise but also potential threats to the ecosystem.	
36	Upper Ganga River (Brijghat to Narora Stretch)	Uttar Pradesh	8 November 2005	265.9	A shallow river stretch of the great Ganges with intermittent small stretches of deep-water pools and reservoirs upstream from barrages. The river provides habitat for the IUCN Red Listed Ganges river dolphin, gharial, crocodile, six species of turtles, otters, 82 species of fish, and more than a hundred species of birds. Major plant species, some of which are said to have medicinal value, include Dalbergia sissoo, Saraca indica, Eucalyptus globulus, Ficus benghalensis, Dendrocalamus strictus, Tectona grandis, Azadirachta indica and aquatic Eichhornia. This river stretch has religious importance for thousands of Hindu pilgrims and is used for cremation and holy baths for spiritual purification. Major threats are sewage discharge, agricultural runoff, and intensive fishing. Conservation activities carried out are planting to prevent bank erosion, training on organic farming, and lobbying to ban commercial fishing.	
37	Vembanad-Kol Wetland	Kerala	19 August 2002	1512.5	It is the largest lake of Kerala, spanning across Alappuzha, Kottayam and Ernakulam, Thrissur, Malappuram districts. Famous tourist locations like Alappuzha and Kumarakom, known for houseboats are here. The mouths of the Pamba and Achankovil rivers in Vembanad forms part of the Kuttanad. It is below sea level and is famous for exotic fish varieties and paddy fields that are below sea level.	
38	Wular Lake	Jammu and Kashmir	23 March 1990	189	The largest freshwater lake in India with extensive marshes of emergent and floating vegetation, particularly water chestnut, that provide an important source of revenue for the state government and fodder for domestic livestock. The lake supports an important fishing industry and is a valuable source of water for irrigation and domestic use. The area is important for wintering, staging and breeding birds. Human activities include rice cultivation and tree farming.	
39	Asan Barrage	Uttarakhand	21 July 2020	4.44	The Asan Conservation Reserve is a 444-hectare stretch of the Asan River running down to its confluence with the Yamuna River in Dehradun district. The damming of the river by the Asan Barrage in 1967 resulted in siltation above the dam wall, which helped to create some of the site's bird-friendly habitats. These habitats support 330 species of birds including the critically endangered red-headed vulture (Sarcogyps calvus), white-rumped vulture (Gyps bengalensis) and Baer's pochard (Aythya baeri). More than 1% of the populations of two waterbird species have been recorded here, these being red-crested pochard (Netta rufina) and ruddy shelduck (Tadorna ferruginea). There are also 49 fish species, one of these being the endangered Putitor mahseer (Tor putitora). Fish use the site for feeding, migration, and spawning. As well as this support for biodiversity and the hydroelectricity production of the barrage, the site's role in maintaining hydrological regimes is important.	
40	Bhitarkanika Mangroves	Odisha; 20°39′N 86°54′E	19 August 2002	650	In 1975, an area of 672 km^{2} was declared the Bhitarkanika Wildlife Sanctuary. The core area of the sanctuary, with an area of 145 km^{2}, was declared Bhitarkanika National Park in September 1998. Gahirmatha Marine Wildlife Sanctuary, which bounds the Bhitarkanika Wildlife Sanctuary to the east, was created in September 1997, and encompasses Gahirmatha Beach and an adjacent portion of the Bay of Bengal. Bhitarkanika Mangroves were designated a Ramsar wetland of international importance in 2002. It is also famous for its saltwater crocodiles and olive ridley sea turtle.	
41	Sur Sarovar	Uttar Pradesh	21 August 2020	4.31	Also known as Keetham Lake, it was originally created to supply water to the city of Agra in the summer, the wetland soon became an important and rich ecosystem. The site's patchwork of habitat types provides refuge to resident and migratory birds, and more than 60 species of fish. Threatened species include the vulnerable greater spotted eagle (Clanga clanga), sarus crane (Grus antigone), and wallago catfish (Wallago attu. The site is important for bird species that migrate on the Central Asian Flyway, with over 30,000 waterbirds known to visit the reservoir annually. Over 1% of the South Asian regional population of the greylag goose (Anser anser) is present.	
42	Lonar Lake	Maharashtra	22 July 2020	4.27	An endorheic or closed basin, almost circular in shape, formed by a meteorite impact some 50,000 years ago, onto the basalt bedrock. It is one of the four known, hyper-velocity, impact craters in basaltic rock anywhere on Earth. It is high in salinity and alkalinity, as the lack of an outflow leads to a concentration of minerals as the lake water evaporates. Fauna includes the vulnerable Asian woollyneck (Ciconia episcopus) and common pochard (Aythya ferina) and the grey wolf (Canis lupus). It is a National Geological Monument recognized by the Geological Survey of India (GSI). It is the only crater lake in the country formed by the meteorite impact. It was identified as a unique geographical site by British officer C. J. E. Alexander in 1823. Hemadpanti temples are located at the periphery of the lake. Recently, the color of Lonar lake water had turned pink due to a large presence of the salt-loving "haloarchaea" microbes. Haloarchaea or halophilic archaea is a bacteria culture that produces pink pigment and is found in water saturated with salt.	
43	Tso Kar	Ladakh	17 November 2020	95.77	It is a high-altitude wetland complex, found at more than 4,500 metres above sea level in the Changthang region of Ladakh. It includes two connected lakes, the freshwater Startsapuk Tso and the larger hypersaline Tso Kar, which are also known as the More plains pool. The name Tso Kar refers to the white salt efflorescence on the margins of the lake caused by the evaporation of the saline waters. It is also an important stopover ground for migratory birds along the Central Asian Flyway. The primary source of lakes is glacial meltwater. It is one of the most important breeding areas in India for the black-necked crane (Grus nigricollis). Some of the species found here are endangered saker falcon (Falco cherrug) and Asiatic wild dog or dhole (Cuon alpinus laniger), and the vulnerable snow leopard (Panthera uncia).	
44	Hokera Wetland	Jammu and Kashmir	8 November 2005	13.75	Located in the northwest Himalayan biogeographic province of Kashmir, on the back of the snow-draped Pir Panchal (1,584 m asl), Hokera Wetland is only 10 km from the scenic paradise of Srinagar. A natural perennial wetland contiguous to the Jhelum basin, it is the only site with remaining reedbeds of Kashmir and a pathway of 68 waterfowl species like large egret, great crested grebe, little cormorant, common shelduck, tufted duck and endangered white-eyed pochard, coming from Siberia, China, central Asia, and northern Europe. It is an important source of food, spawning grounds, and nursery for fishes, besides offering feeding and breeding ground to a variety of water birds. Typical marshy vegetation complexes inhabit like Typha, Phragmites, Eleocharis, Trapa, and Nymphoides species ranging from shallow water to open water aquatic flora. Sustainable exploitation of fish, fodder, and fuel is significant, despite water withdrawals since 1999. Potential threats include recent housing facilities, littered garbage, and demand for increasing tourist facilities.	
45	Kanjli Wetland	Punjab	22 January 2002	1.83	A permanent stream, the Kali Bein, converted by construction of a small barrage in 1870 into a water storage area for irrigation purposes. The site fulfills Criteria 3 "it supports populations of plant and/or animal species important for maintaining the biological diversity of a particular biogeographic region", because of its importance in supporting a considerable diversity of aquatic, mesophytic, and terrestrial flora and fauna in the biogeographical region, and acts also as a key regulator of groundwater discharge and recharge with the seasons. By this means and by direct abstraction of water for irrigation by the local population, the site plays a crucial role in agriculture which predominates on the surrounding fertile plain, with fewer pressures upon water supplies than elsewhere in Punjab. The invasive water hyacinth is present and must be removed from time to time; increasing pollution levels, deforestation in the catchment area, and excessive grazing are seen as potential threats. The stream is considered to be the most significant in the state from the religious point of view, as it is associated with the first guru of the Sikhs, Guru Nanak. The stream itself and the surrounding marsh are under provincial ownership and the surrounding areas are privately owned. The site is a centre for environmental tourism and picnicking.	
46	Chilika Lake	Odisha	1 October 1981	1165	A brackish water lagoon, spread over the districts of Puri, Khordha and Ganjam on the east coast of India, at the mouth of the Daya River, flowing into the Bay of Bengal, covering an area of over 1,100 km^{2}. It is the largest coastal lagoon in India and the second largest lagoon in the world. The lagoon hosts over 160 species of birds in the peak migratory season. Birds from as far as the Caspian Sea, Lake Baikal, the Aral Sea, and other remote parts of Russia, Kirghiz steppes of Mongolia, Central and southeast Asia, Ladakh, and the Himalayas come here. These birds travel great distances; migratory birds probably follow much longer routes than the straight lines, possibly up to 12,000 km, to reach Chilika Lake. In 1981, Chilika Lake was designated the first Indian wetland of international importance under the Ramsar Convention. In November 2002, the Ramsar Wetland Conservation Award was presented to the Chilika Development Authority for "outstanding achievements in the field of restoration and wise use of wetlands and effective participation of local communities in these activities". White-bellied sea eagles, greylag geese, purple moorhen, jacana, flamingos, egrets, grey and purple herons, Indian roller, storks, white ibis, spoonbills, brahminy ducks, shovellers, pintails, and more. Nalbana Island is the core area of the Ramsar designated wetlands of Chilika Lake. Nalbana was notified in 1987 and declared a bird sanctuary in 1973 under the Wildlife Protection Act. The Irrawaddy dolphin (Orcaella brevirostris) is the flagship species of Chilika lake. Chilka is home to the only known population of Irrawaddy dolphins in India and one of only two lagoons in the world that are home to this species. It is classified as critically endangered in five of the seven places it is known to live.	
47	Beas Conservation Reserve	Punjab; 31°23′N 75°11′E	26 September 2019	64		
48	Bakhira Sanctuary	Uttar Pradesh	29 June 2021	28.94	It is the largest natural flood plain wetland of India in Sant Kabir Nagar district of Eastern Uttar Pradesh. The sanctuary was established in 1980. It provides a safe wintering and staging ground for a large number of species of the Central Asian Flyway.	
49	Harike Wetland	Punjab	23 March 1990	41	A shallow water reservoir with thirteen islands, at the confluence of two rivers. Dense floating vegetation covers 70% of the lake. It is an important site for breeding, wintering, and staging birds, supporting over 200,000 Anatidae (ducks, geese, swans, etc.) during migration. The entire lake is leased on an annual basis to commercial fishery organizations.|	
50	Karikili Bird Sanctuary	Tamil Nadu	8 April 2022	0.58	Karikili Bird Sanctuary is a 58 hectare protected area located in the Kancheepuram district of Tamil Nadu. The sanctuary is about 75 km from Chennai, south of Chengalpattu.	
51	Pallikaranai Marsh Reserve Forest	Tamil Nadu	8 April 2022	12.48	Pallikaranai wetland is a freshwater marsh located in Chennai, Tamil Nadu. It is the only surviving wetland ecosystem of the city and among the few and last remaining natural wetlands of South India.	
52	Pichavaram Mangrove Forest and Kodiyampalayam Mangrove Forest	Tamil Nadu	8 April 2022	14.79	The Pichavaram mangrove forest is located near the village of Pichavaram, close to Chidambaram in the Cuddalore district of Tamil Nadu, and extends up to the Kodiyampalayam island in the Mayiladuthurai district. It is one of the largest mangrove forests in India, covering an area of approximately 1,100 hectares.	
53	Pala Wetland	Mizoram	31 August 2021	18.50	The Pala wetland is the largest natural wetland in Mizoram. The renowned landmark is surrounded by green woodlands and is home to a rich diversity of animal species including a range of animals and birds.	
54	Sakhya Sagar	Madhya Pradesh	7 January 2022	2.48	Sakhya Sagar Lake is an integral part of the beautiful ecology of the Madhav National Park in Shivpuri, Madhya Pradesh.	
55	Satkosia Gorge	Odisha	12 October 2021	982	Satkosia Gorge is located in Angul district of Odisha carved out of Mahanadi river. The gorge is located within the Satkosia Tiger Reserve which is a United nations Protected area	
56	Bhoj Wetland	Madhya Pradesh; 23°14′N 77°20′E	19 August 2002	32	It consists of two lakes located in the city of Bhopal, the capital of Madhya Pradesh. The two lakes are the Bhojtal (Upper Lake) and the Lower Lake, which lie to the west of the city centre. It is a man-made reservoir. More than 20,000 birds are observed annually. Bhoj Wetland was recognized as a wetland of international importance under the Ramsar Convention in 2002. Upper Lake acts as the lifeline of the city supplying 40% of its potable water. White storks, black-necked storks, bar-headed geese, spoonbills, etc., that have been rare sightings in the past, have started appearing. A recent phenomenon is the gathering of 100-120 sarus cranes in the lake. The largest bird of India, the sarus crane (Grus antigone) is known for its size, majestic flight, and lifetime pairing.	
57	Gulf of Mannar Marine Biosphere Reserve	Tamil Nadu	8 April 2022	527	Gulf of Mannar is located at the south-eastern tip of India in the state of Tamil Nadu. It is one of the most biologically diverse regions in India supporting various species of coral, fish, birds, crustaceans, sea turtles and mangroves.	
58	Ranganathittu Bird Sanctuary	Karnataka	15 February 2022	5.18	Ranganathittu is located in Mandya district of Karnataka. It is an ecologically important riverine wetland, rich in plant and animal species such as mugger crocodile, hump-backed mahseer, painted stork, spot-billed pelican and black-headed ibis.	
59	Vembannur Wetland Complex	Tamil Nadu	8 April 2022	0.20	Vembannur Wetland Complex is a man-made inland tank which forms the southernmost tip of peninsular India. It is located 4 km from Rajakkamangalam in Tamil Nadu. it provides suitable habitat to several species of waterbirds.	
60	Vellode Bird Sanctuary	Tamil Nadu	8 April 2022	0.77	Vellode Bird Sanctuary is located in Erode district of Tamil Nadu. It is a man-made tank which is an ideal habitat for birds.	
61	Udhayamarthandapuram Bird Sanctuary	Tamil Nadu	8 April 2022	0.44	Udhayamarthandapuram is located in Thiruvarur district of Tamil Nadu. The site consists of man-made irrigation tanks and serves as an important staging and breeding ground for several species of waterbirds.	
62	Vedanthangal Bird Sanctuary	Tamil Nadu	8 April 2022	0.40	Vedanthangal is located in Chengalpattu district of Tamil Nadu.It is the oldest water bird sanctuary in the country.	
63	Sirpur Lake	Madhya Pradesh	7 January 2022	1.61	The site is located in Indore district of Madhya Pradesh. It is a man-made wetland that supports terrestrial plants species, macrophytes, fish, reptiles, amphibians and waterbirds.	
64	Koonthankulam Bird Sanctuary	Tamil Nadu	8 November 2021	0.72	Koonthankulam is located in Thirunelveli district of Tamil Nadu. The Site consists of irrigation tanks interconnected by a network of canals.	
65	Tampara Lake	Odisha	12 October 2021	3		
66	Hirakud Reservoir	Odisha	12 October 2021	743	Hirakund Reservoir is located behind the Hirakund Dam in Odisha. It's shoreline runs close to Debrigarh Wildlife Sanctuary.	
67	Ansupa Lake	Odisha	12 October 2021	2.31		
68	Yashwant Sagar	Madhya Pradesh	7 January 2022	8.229		
69	Chitrangudi Bird Sanctuary	Tamil Nadu	8 November 2021	2.6047		
70	Suchindram Theroor Wetland Complex	Tamil Nadu	8 April 2022	0.9423	Situated within Suchindram Theroor Birds Sanctuary, it lies at the southern tip of migratory birds' Central Asian flyway.	
71	Vaduvur Bird Sanctuary	Tamil Nadu	8 April 2022	1.1264		
72	Kanjirankulam Bird Sanctuary	Tamil Nadu	8 April 2022	0.9689		
73	Thane Creek	Maharashtra	13 April 2022	65.2108		
74	Hygam Wetland Conservation Reserve	Jammu and Kashmir	8 June 2022	8.0182		
75	Shallabugh Wetland Conservation Reserve	Jammu and Kashmir	8 June 2022	16.75		
76	Ankasamudra Bird Conservation Reserve	Karnataka	10 March 2023	0.9876	Human-made Village Irrigation Tank was built centuries back. Home to Painted Stork and Black-headed Ibis.	
77	Aghanashini Estuary	Karnataka	14 February 2023	48.01	Formed at the confluence of the Aghanashini River with Arabian sea.	
78	Magadi Kere Conservation Reserve	Karnataka	14 February 2023	0.5438	Bar-headed goose winter here.	
79	Karaivetti Bird sanctuary	Tamil Nadu	24 May 2023	4.5372	Home to Pin-tailed duck, Garganey, Northern Shoveler, Common Pochard, Eurasian Wigeon, Common teal and Cotton teal	
80	Longwood Shola Reserve Forest	Tamil Nadu	24 May 2023	1.16007	Serve as habitats for Black-chinned Nilgiri Laughingthrush, Nilgiri Blue Robin and vulnerable Nilgiri Wood-pigeon.	
81	Nagi Bird Sanctuary	Bihar	11 October 2023			
82	Nakti Bird Sanctuary	Bihar	11 October 2023			
83	Tawa Reservoir	Madhya Pradesh	8 January 2024			
84	Nanjarayan Bird Sanctuary	Tamil Nadu	16 January 2024			
85	Kazhuveli Bird Sanctuary	Tamil Nadu	16 January 2024			
86	Sakkarakottai Bird Sanctuary	Tamil Nadu	2 February 2025			
87	Therthangal Bird Sanctuary	Tamil Nadu	2 February 2025			
88	Khecheopalli Lake	Sikkim	2 February 2025	12		
89	Udhwa Lake	Jharkhand	2 February 2025			
90	Khichan Wetland	Rajasthan	4 June 2025		Known for migratory demoiselle cranes locally known as Kurja.	
91	Menar Wetland Complex	Rajasthan	4 June 2025		Known for migratory Greater Flamingo and large population of Peacocks.	
92	Udaypur Lake	Bihar	25 September 2025		Known for migratory and resident birds.	
93	Gokul Reservoir	Bihar	25 September 2025	Udaypur Lake	Known for migratory and resident birds.	
94	Gogabeel Lake	Bihar	27 September 2025		Located in Katihar district	
95	Kopra Reservoir	Chhattisgarh	12 December 2025		Located in Bilaspur District	
96	Siliserh Lake	Rajasthan	12 December 2025		Located in Alwar	
97	Patna Bird Sanctuary	Uttar Pradesh	31 January 2026		Located in Etah district	
98	Chhari-Dhand	Gujarat	31 January 2026		Located in Kutch district	
99	Shekha Jheel Bird Sanctuary	Uttar Pradesh	22 April 2026		Located in Aligarh	
100	Jai Prakash Narayan Bird Sanctuary (Surha Tal)	Uttar Pradesh	5 June 2026		Located in Ballia. Known for migratory birds.	
101	Glaw Lake	Arunachal Pradesh	3 August 2026		Located in Lohit district. Known for native tree and orchid species and rare animals.	
102	Sauj Jheel	Uttar Pradesh	15 October 2026		Located in Mainpuri district. The addition of Sauj Jheel made Mainpuri the only district in India to have two Ramsar sites, the other being Saman Bird Sanctuary.	
103	Sukhna Lake	Chandigarh	15 October 2026		Chandigarh's first Ramsar site.	

== Categorisation and mapping ==
The first national-level wetland mapping was completed by the Space Applications Centre (SAC) of the Indian Space Research Organisation (ISRO) in Ahmedabad in 1992–93 at a 1:250,000 scale using IRS LISS-I/II data.

The National Wetland Inventory and Assessment project produced a substantially more detailed and updated national database. It represents the most comprehensive spatial mapping of wetlands in India's history. Wetlands were classified into 19 categories and mapped at a scale of 1:50,000 using data from the Indian Remote Sensing Satellite IRS P6 LISS-III sensor. The methodology used four spectral bands - green, red, near-infrared, and short-wave infrared - to derive indices for water extent, turbidity, and aquatic vegetation including floating and emergent types. Results were organised at district, state, and topographic map sheet levels using Geographic Information System (GIS) technology, with paired pre-monsoon and post-monsoon datasets to capture seasonal variability.

== See also ==
- Ramsar Convention
- List of Ramsar Sites
- Wetlands in Indian Cities
- Sustainable Development Goal 6
