= Saman, Mainpuri =

Village in Uttar Pradesh, India

Saman
- Village
- Location in Uttar Pradesh, India
- Coordinates: 27.02561°N 79.18987°E
- Country: India
- State: Uttar Pradesh
- District: Mainpuri
- Tehsil: Bhongaon

Area
  - Total: 32.533 km^{2} (12.561 sq mi)

Population (2011)
  - Total: 14,522
  - Density: 446.38/km^{2} (1,156.1/sq mi)
- Time zone: UTC+5:30 (IST)

Saman (or Samān) is a large village in Kishni block of Mainpuri district, Uttar Pradesh. It is the site of the Saman Bird Sanctuary, a large wetland area designated as a protected Ramsar site since 2019. The village lands occupy a large area, and there are many distinct hamlets counted as part of its administrative jurisdiction. As of 2011, Saman had a total population of 14,522, in 2,382 households.

== Geography ==
Saman is located about 32 km south of Bhongaon, the tehsil headquarters. The road from Kishni to Sirsaganj passes through here, and another road coming from Mainpuri meets it at Saman. There is a large jhil to the west of Saman, the largest in the district. The Gangsi distributary canal also runs through the village, providing water for irrigation.

Saman Bird Sanctuary is a seasonal, rain-fed oxbow lake. This has been a protected Ramsar site since 2019. The sanctuary's northern border is the Kishni-Karhal road, while the western border is the boundary between the villages of Saman and Sauj. This weland is home to around 150 nests of black-crowned night herons, egrets, and Indian pond herons; several breeding pairs of sarus cranes; at least one breeding pair of black-necked storks; and several greater spotted eagles year-round. During the winter, thousands of migratory birds flock to the wetland; the number regularly exceeds 50,000. In total, some 187 bird species have been recorded here. Various mammals, such as the nilgai, also live in the weland. There is a diverse plant life including various aquatic plants such as the mosquitofern (Azolla pinnata), Cyperus alopecuroides, waterthyme (Hydrilla verticillata), and Smithia sensitiva. The site covers about 525 hectares, about 3/4 of which is privately owned as of 2020.

According to the 2011 census, Saman has a total area of 3,255.3 hectares, of which 1,706.0 were currently farmland, 771.0 were fallow lands, and 47.7 were under non-agricultural use. 1.0 hectares were occupied by orchards, 0 were occupied by permanent pastures, 21.5 were classified as cultivable but not currently under any agricultural use, and 283.0 were classified as non-cultivable. 425.0 hectares of forest existed on village lands.

== History ==
At the turn of the century, Saman was described as comprising 17 hamlets, with a school and bank and a number of shops. It had previously been part of the taluqa of Kishni, but by that point had been separated from it. As of 1901, Saman's population was 5,536.

== Demographics ==
As of 2011, Saman had a population of 14,522, in 2,382 households. This population was 54.1% male (7,851) and 45.9% female (6,671). The 0-6 age group numbered 2,347 (1,234 male and 1,113 female), or 16.2% of the total population. 3,049 residents were members of Scheduled Castes, or 21.0% of the total.

The 1981 census recorded Saman as having a population of 8,756 people, in 1,454 households.

The 1961 census recorded Saman as comprising 38 hamlets, with a total population of 6,161 people (3,295 male and 2,866 female), in 1,153 households and 894 physical houses. The area of the village was given as 7,646 acres and it had a post office at that point.

== Economy ==
Saman hosts markets twice per week, on Thursdays and Saturdays. The village has at least one bank and one agricultural credit society.

== Infrastructure ==
As of 2011, Saman had 4 primary schools and 1 primary health centre. Drinking water was provided by well and hand pump; there were no public toilets. The village had a post office but no public library; there was at least some access to electricity for residential and agricultural purposes. Streets were made of both kachcha and pakka materials.
