= Saman Bird Sanctuary =

Bird watching area in Uttar Pradesh, India

- IUCN category IV (habitat/species management area)
- Location within Uttar Pradesh Location within India
- Interactive map of Saman Bird Sanctuary
- Location: Saman, Mainpuri district, Uttar Pradesh, India
- Nearest city: Mainpuri
- Coordinates: 27°01′28″N 79°10′58″E
- Governing body: Uttar Pradesh Government
Designations
Ramsar Wetland
- Official name: Saman Bird Sanctuary
- Designated: 2 December 2019
- Reference no.: 2413

Saman Bird Sanctuary is a wetland in Mainpuri district, in western Uttar Pradesh. Located in the village of Saman, it has been designated as a protected Ramsar site since 2019.

== Geography ==
Saman Bird Sanctuary is centred around a seasonal, rain-fed oxbow lake on flat ground. Its northern boundary is the Kishni-Karhal road, and its western boundary is defined by the border between the villages of Saman and Sauj. Its southern boundary is marked by the boundary between Saman and the village of Sarsai Helu, which forms part of Etawah district. The sanctuary covers a total area of about 525 hectares (the official government designation is 526.3 hectares, but GIS calculations give an area of 527.7 hectares). As of 2020, about 75% of the designated area consists of privately owned land.

=== Getting There ===
Mainpuri is the nearest railhead. Also, UPSRTC operates city buses to and from the main archaeological sites. Agra is the nearest Airport.

== Ecology ==
The sanctuary is home to around 150 nests of black-crowned night herons, egrets, and Indian pond herons; several breeding pairs of sarus cranes; at least one breeding pair of black-necked storks; and several greater spotted eagles year-round. During the winter, thousands of migratory birds flock to the wetland; the number regularly exceeds 50,000. In total, some 187 bird species have been recorded here. The wetland is also home to mammals, such as the nilgai, and reptiles, such as the Bengal monitor lizard (Varanus bengalensis).There is a diverse plant life including various aquatic plants such as the mosquitofern (Azolla pinnata), Cyperus alopecuroides, waterthyme (Hydrilla verticillata), and Smithia sensitiva.

The wetland also plays an important role in groundwater recharge.

== Attractions ==
The sanctuary is spread over an area of 5 km^{2}. Besides birds, there are different animals such as Jackal, Mongoose, Hare and various local and migratory birds.

The best time to visit the sanctuary is between November and February.

Birds here include Sarus Cranes and Black Necked Stork as well as sharp hunters like Egyptian vulture, Sparrow Hawk, Black Shouldered Kite, Crested Serpent Eagle and Black Kite. Some Small species of birds are also residing in nearby areas of the Sanctuary like Magpie Robin, Rufous Fronted Prinia, Little Green Bee-eater, Tailor Bird and Ashy Prinia. Indian Grey Hornbill, Lineated Barbet, Yellow Footed Green Pigeon and Asian Openbill are some of the species which are not common for an area like this.
