= Beas Conservation Reserve =

Protected natural area in India

Coordinates: 31°23′N 75°11′E

The Beas Conservation Reserve covers an 185 km stretch of the river Beas. The area of the Reserve lies primarily in north-west Punjab. It was declared a conservation reserve by the government of Punjab, India in 2017. The Beas flows down meandering from the Himalayan foothills to Harike Headworks, where it spreads into multiple channels. The braided channels form islands and sand bars creating a complex environment that supports rich biodiversity. In September 2019, the reserve was declared a Ramsar site under the aegis of the 1971 Ramsar Convention on Wetlands of International Importance.

== Biodiversity ==
Beas Conservation Reserve hosts more than 500 species of birds and over 90 species of fish. It is the only location to host the endangered Indus river dolphin (Platanista gangetica minor), once thought to be lost from the country. It is a functionally blind mammal that performs underwater navigation and hunting activities through echolocation. Other threatened species which are found in the reserve include the endangered masheer (Tor putitora), the hog deer (Axis porcinus), the fishing cat, and the vulnerable smooth-coated otter (Lutrogale perspicillata). A 2017 programme reintroduced 47 long-snouted gharials (Gavialis gangeticus) to the Beas, 30 years after they had disappeared. The presence of the Indus river dolphin and the gharial, led the area to be declared a conservation reserve.

== Environmental concerns ==
Urban as well as domestic pollution has threatened the ecosystem of the reserve. Agriculture along the river's course also stands as a major factor. The river itself is fragmented by dams, barrages and canals, disrupting water flow into the ecosystem.

== Research ==
Peer-reviewed geospatial research published in 2025 examined human–wildlife interactions around the Beas Conservation Reserve using landscape metrics and spatial modelling.

== Measures taken ==
The Department of Forests and Wildlife Preservation, Punjab, conduct the scientific management of the wetland. Since the declaration of the area as a conservation reserve, it is being protected under the Wildlife (Protection) Act. Commercial fishing as well as netting have been banned within the reserve area, and experts have noted that indiscriminate fishing has been significantly reduced.
