= Hokersar =

Wetland conservation area in Jammu and Kashmir, India

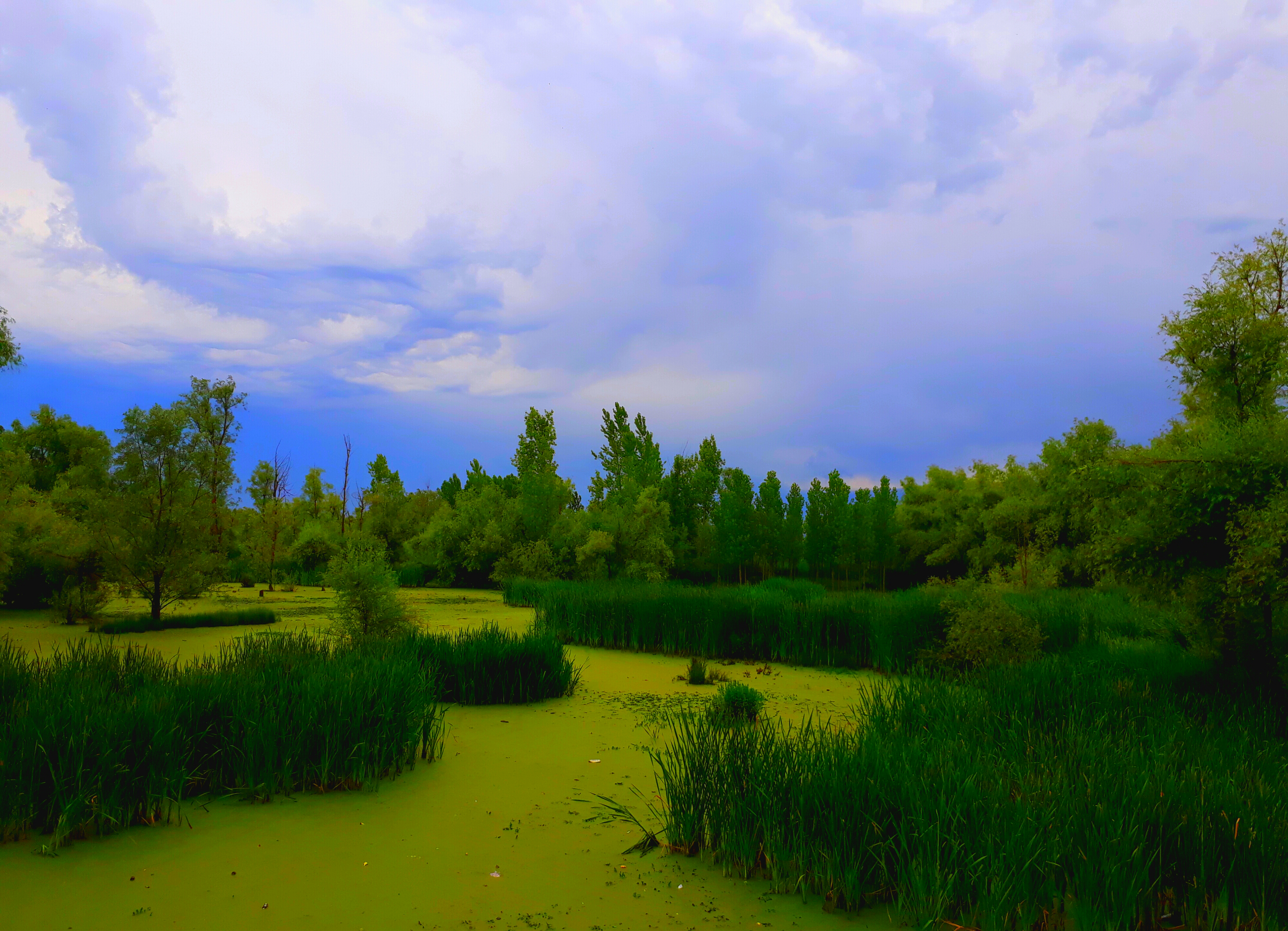
- Hokersar wetland in Srinagar district, Jammu and Kashmir, India

- Location within Jammu and Kashmir
- Location: Zainakote, Srinagar district, Jammu and Kashmir, India
- Nearest city: Srinagar city
- Coordinates: 34°05′42″N 74°42′27″E
- Area: 1,375 hectares (3,400 acres)
- Governing body: Jammu & Kashmir Department of Wildlife Protection

Ramsar Wetland
- Designated: 8 November 2005
- Reference no.: 1570

The Hokersar is a wetland conservation area in Zainakote, in Srinagar district of Jammu and Kashmir, India. It lies in the Kashmir Valley, 10 kilometres (6.2 mi) northwest of Srinagar. The Hokersar, which spreads over 1,375 hectares (13.75 km^{2}), is a designated bird sanctuary.

== Geography ==
The Hokersar wetland, which is the largest bird reserve in the Kashmir Valley, is situated in the Jhelum River basin. It is the northernmost part of the Doodhganga catchment, at an altitude of 1,584 metres (5,197 ft) above sea level. The reserve is fed by the two perennial inlet streams; Doodhganaga from the east and Sukhnag from the west. It includes a lake and a marshy area with an average depth of 0.91 m (3 ft). In the spring, the water level rises to as much as 2.4 m (8 ft) due to runoff from snowmelt in the Pir Panjal mountain range. The wetland also acts as an absorption basin for floodwaters.

== Flora and fauna ==
The Hokersar wetland consists of three zones with varied flora. The northeastern zone contains various dense macrophytes while Trapa natans and Phragmites australis are found predominantly in the central zone, which is a large expanse of water. The southern zone is a silted portion and acts as pasture land.

The Hokersar wetland is a designated bird sanctuary. It serves as an important staging ground for medium and long distance migratory shorebirds, geese, cranes, ducks and other species that breed in the northern latitudes of Siberia and Central Asia. The Valley of Kashmir as a whole is strategically located south of the Pamirs and at the western extremity of the Himalayan range. The waterbirds fly to Kashmir Valley via the Central Asian Flyway. They begin to arrive in September–October and leave by May. Over 500,000 waterbirds were recorded in the Hokersar Wetland in 2000–01. There were seven globally threatened species among the 45 waterbird species and 66 wetland-associated bird species reported in the reserve. Northern pintail, mallard, gadwall, northern shoveller, Eurasian wigeon and common teal are the most common waterfowl, found in large numbers during the winter. Eurasian coot, red-crested pochard, greylag goose, common pochard, garganey, and ruddy shelduck are among the other species of waterbirds also found in the reserve.

== Conservation ==
The Hokersar wetland was first designated as a conservation reserve under the Jammu and Kashmir Wildlife (Protection) Act, 1978. Hokersar, Haigam and Shallabugh Wetland are protected areas within the Jhelum basin and have also been declared as bird sanctuaries by the government of Jammu & Kashmir. In 2005, the reserve was recognised as a wetland of international importance under the Ramsar Convention as Hokera Wetland. It falls under India's National Wetlands Conservation Programme and is also included in the network of Important Bird Areas.

== Threats ==
Threats to the Hokersar wetland include human activities and encroachments. The wetland has been reduced from 18.75 km^{2} (7.24 sq mi) in 1969 to 13.00 km^{2} (5.02 sq mi) in 2008. Over time, many areas of the wetland have been converted into paddy cultivations. Discharge of the domestic waste into the wetland, primarily through the inlet streams, has led to excessive weed growth and eutrophication, both of which pose a great threat to the reserve's flora.
