= Surha Tal =

- Location within Uttar Pradesh
- Location: Ballia, Uttar Pradesh, India
- Coordinates: 25°51′00″N 84°10′00″E
- Type: Oxbow Lake
- Primary inflows: Garai River, Budhi River and Madha Nala
- Primary outflows: Kathar Nala (to the river Ganges)
- Max. length: 4.7 km (2.9 mi)
- Max. width: 3.9 km (2.4 mi)
- Surface area: 34.32 km^{2} (13.25 sq mi)
- Surface elevation: 190 ft (58 m)
- Frozen: Never
- Islands: None

Ramsar Wetland
- Designated: 19 January 2026
- Reference no.: 2595

Surha Tal, locally called Suraha Taal (Note: Bhojpuri: ताल (lake)), officially recognised as Jai Prakash Narayan Bird Sanctuary, is an oxbow lake located in Ballia District of Uttar Pradesh, India. It is an oval-shaped wetland with a maximum reported area of 34.32 km^{2} (13.25 sq mi) and lies about 17 km (11 mi) north of Ballia, near the left bank of the Ganga River. On 19 January 2026, it was designated as a Ramsar site by the Ramsar Convention, making it India's 100th Ramsar site after official announcement on 5 June 2026.

== Geography ==
Surha Tal is situated in the Middle Ganga Plain and owes its origin to the meandering of the Ganges. It is an oxbow lake fed by three seasonal channels–Garai River, Budhi River and Madha Nala, and drains into the Ganga through Kathar Nala, a 23-km outlet. The flow in Kathar Nala can reverse during high floods in the Ganges and Sarayu rivers.

The lake's extent varies seasonally, reaching its maximum extent during the months of August–September. The wetland plays a key role in flood mitigation, groundwater recharge, and supporting agriculture in the surrounding region. It was declared a bird sanctuary by the Government of Uttar Pradesh in 1991 and is recognised for its rich avifaunal diversity, hosting both resident and migratory birds.

Studies of the lake's water quality have indicated stable physico-chemical parameters suitable for aquatic biodiversity.

== Ramsar Site designation ==
On 19 January 2026, the Ramsar Convention recognized the lake as a Ramsar site. This made the lake India's 100th Ramsar site after official announcement by the Ministry of Environment, Forest and Climate Change (MoEFCC) on 5 June 2026, coinciding with World Environment Day. With this, Uttar Pradesh has 13 Ramsar sites, the second-highest among Indian states after Tamil Nadu. The Ramsar status recognises the wetland’s international importance for biodiversity, especially waterbirds, and commits India to maintaining its ecological character through wise use.

== Economics ==
The lake supports the livelihoods of fishing communities in surrounding villages. Its primary ecosystem service is water storage and recharge of the local water table, enabling multi-season rice cultivation in the catchment. Following the Ramsar designation, the state government has identified eco-tourism development to generate employment for local communities as guides, boat operators and homestay hosts. The sanctuary attracts birdwatchers and tourists during the winter migratory season.

== Possibility of Impact Crater ==
Local folklore refers to "Surha" as meaning "big mouth" and speculates that the lake's near-circular shape indicates an impact crater. However, geological studies identify the lake as a natural oxbow lake formed by meander cut-off of the Ganges. No peer-reviewed scientific evidence supports an impact origin. The surrounding Middle Ganga Plain is characterised by alluvial deposits and abandoned river channels.

== See also ==
- List of Ramsar sites in India
- Ramsar Convention
- List of wildlife sanctuaries in India
- Oxbow Lake
- Indo-Gangetic Plain
