= Sakkarakottai Bird Sanctuary =

Protected area in Tamil Nadu, India

- IUCN category IV (habitat/species management area)
- Location within Tamil Nadu Location within India
- Interactive map of Sakkarakottai Bird Sanctuary
- Location: Ramanathapuram district, Tamil Nadu, India
- Coordinates: 9°22′11″N 78°51′59″E
- Area: 230.49 ha (569.6 acres)
- Established: 2010
- Governing body: Ministry of Environment and Forests, Government of India

Ramsar Wetland
- Official name: Sakkarakottai Bird Sanctuary
- Designated: 15 July 2024
- Reference no.: 2561

Sakkarakottai Bird Sanctuary is a bird sanctuary in Ramanathapuram district in the Indian state of Tamil Nadu. Established in 2012, it is spread across an area of 230.49 ha (569.6 acres). It has been designated as a protected Ramsar site since 2024.

== Geography ==
Sakkarakottai bird sanctuary is located in Ramanathapuram district in the Indian state of Tamil Nadu. Established in 2012, it is spread across an area of 230.49 ha (569.6 acres). It is a protected area under the Wildlife Protection Act of 1972. The wetland ecosystem is fed by small rivulets during the rainy seasons. The water rich with nutrients augmented by bird droppings served primarily as a source of water for agriculture purposes. It has been designated as a protected Ramsar site since 2024.

== Flora and fauna ==
The area consists of about 165 species of plants including a number of Acacia nilotica trees, most of which were planted by the Tamil Nadu Forest Department and serves as the main nest-supporting trees. About 124 species of birds have been recorded in the sanctuary, including Egyptian vulture, Indian spotted eagle, Black-headed ibis, Spot-billed pelican, Oriental Darter, Asian woolly-necked stork, and Pallid harrier. The wetlands are also home to 10 mammal, 14 reptile, eight amphibian, and various insect species.

== See also ==
- List of birds of Tamil Nadu
- List of wildlife sanctuaries of India
