= Nangal Wildlife Sanctuary =

Protected wetland sanctuary in Punjab, India

Coordinates: 31°24′09″N 76°22′12″E

- IUCN category IV (habitat/species management area)
- Interactive map of Nangal Wildlife Sanctuary
- Location: Nangal, Rupnagar district, Punjab, India
- Nearest city: Nangal
- Area: 1.16 km^{2} (0.45 sq mi)
- Established: 2009
- Governing body: Department of Forest and Wildlife (Punjab)

Nangal Wildlife Sanctuary is a protected area located in the foothills of the Shivalik Hills in Rupnagar district, in the state of Punjab, India. It spans an area of 116 hectares and forms a part of the larger Nangal Wetland, situated on the banks of the Sutlej River. The sanctuary is a significant ecological habitat supporting a range of flora and fauna, including several threatened species. It is a section of a man-made reservoir on the Sutlej River that was created in 1961 as part of the Bhakra-Nangal Project.

== Ecological significance ==
Nangal Wildlife Sanctuary is home to over 150 species of birds, 35 species of fish, and numerous species of mammals, amphibians, and reptiles. It provides critical habitat for migratory waterbirds and several threatened species such as the Indian pangolin (Manis crassicaudata) and the Egyptian vulture (Neophron percnopterus).

In 2019, it was designated as a Ramsar site under the Ramsar Convention (Site No. 2407).

== Location and features ==
The sanctuary is located in and around the city of Nangal, adjacent to the Nangal Dam. Due to its scenic beauty and rich birdlife, the sanctuary attracts nature enthusiasts and birdwatchers, especially during the winter migration season.

== Conservation ==
Despite its ecological value, the sanctuary faces challenges due to encroachment, pollution, lack of awareness and habitat degradation. Conservation efforts have been recommended by ecologists to restore and manage the wetland habitat more effectively.

== See also ==
- List of Ramsar sites in India
- Wildlife sanctuaries of India
