= Therthangal Bird Sanctuary =

Protected area in Tamil Nadu, India

- IUCN category IV (habitat/species management area)
- Location within Tamil Nadu Location within India
- Interactive map of Therthangal Bird Sanctuary
- Location: Ramanathapuram district, Tamil Nadu, India
- Coordinates: 9°27′27″N 78°46′10″E
- Area: 29.295 ha (72.39 acres)
- Established: 2010
- Governing body: Ministry of Environment and Forests, Government of India

Ramsar Wetland
- Official name: Therthangal Bird Sanctuary
- Designated: 15 July 2024
- Reference no.: 2562

Therthangal Bird Sanctuary is a bird sanctuary in Ramanathapuram district in the Indian state of Tamil Nadu. Established in 2010, it is spread across an area of 29.295 ha (72.39 acres). It has been designated as a protected Ramsar site since 2024.

== Geography ==
Therthangal bird sanctuary is located in Ramanathapuram district in the Indian state of Tamil Nadu. Established in 2010, it is spread across an area of 29.295 ha (72.39 acres). It is a protected area under the Wildlife Protection Act of 1972. The wetland ecosystem is fed by small rivulets from the Vaigai and Gundar rivers. The tank gets water only during the rainy seasons, and it served primarily as a source of water for agriculture purposes. It has been designated as a protected Ramsar site since 2024.

== Flora and fauna ==
The area consists of about 133 species of plants including a large number of Acacia nilotica trees, most of which were planted by the Tamil Nadu Forest Department and serves as the main nest-supporting trees. About 96 species of birds have been recorded in the sanctuary, including the endangered Egyptian vulture and the Indian spotted eagle. The sanctuary lies on the Central Asian Flyway, an important bird migration route, and serves as a temporary refuge for a large number of migratory birds including grebes, pelicans, cormorants, darters, herons, egrets, bitterns, and storks. The wetlands are also home to seven mammal, 11 reptile, six amphibian, and various insect species.

== See also ==
- List of birds of Tamil Nadu
- List of wildlife sanctuaries of India
