= Parvati Arga Bird Sanctuary =

Nature reserve in Uttar Pradesh, India

Coordinates: 26°56′N 82°09′E

Parvati Arga Wildlife Sanctuary
- IUCN category IV (habitat/species management area)
- Location within Uttar Pradesh Location within India
- Interactive map of Parvati Arga Wildlife Sanctuary
- Location: Gonda district, Uttar Pradesh, India
- Area: 10.84 km^{2} (4.19 sq mi)
- Established: 1990

Designations

Ramsar Wetland
- Official name: Parvati Arga Bird Sanctuary
- Designated: 2 December 2019
- Reference no.: 2416

Parvati Arga Bird Sanctuary is situated in Tarabganj Tehsil about 40 km from Gonda District and about 45 km from Gonda city at Mankapur-Nawabganj Road and Mankapur-Faizabad Railway Line in the state of Uttar Pradesh, India. The lake is naturally able to sustain resident birds throughout the year and migratory birds during winter season.

== History ==
Parvati Arga was declared a bird sanctuary on 23 May 1990. Prior to that it was under the fisheries department.

On March 22, 2021, the Union Ministry declared that Ramsar Convention had added 15 more sites from India, which includes Parvati Arga. As of May 2024, there were 80 Ramsar sites in the country.

As per the official website of Uttar Pradesh tourism, the sanctuary was established in 1997.

In December 2025, the sanctuary was declared an eco-sensitive zone, notified by the Ministry of Environment, Forest and Climate Change.

== Administration ==
Parvati Arga Bird Sanctuary was declared vide Government. Notification No. 1021/14-3-14/90 dated 23.05.1990. The sanctuary consists of two lakes i.e. Parvati and Arga situated about 1.5 km. apart. Tikari Reserve Forest falling under jurisdiction of Gonda Forest Division is at about 1 Km and 9 villages fall within this area. The nearest town is Wajeerganj which is at a distance of 12 km from the Sanctuary.

The sanctuary is under the administrative control of Sohelwa Wildlife Division whose head quarter is at Balrampur.

== Setting ==
The lake was a part of the Saryu River. As the river changed its flow path these lakes were left as its remains. Thus, both the lakes are oxbow lakes.

The two oxbow lakes, Parvati Tal and Arga Tal, cover and area of 10.84 square kilometers.

== Flora and fauna ==
Parvati Arga Bird Sanctuary is in the Upper Gangetic Plains moist deciduous forests ecoregion.

These wetlands offer an exceptional habitat for waterbirds, providing roosting and breeding sites. />

The avian population of the bird sanctuary is a mix of about 35 species of resident as well as migratory birds.

The birds migrate across Himalayas from Tibet, China, Europe and Siberia during winters. Some of these birds fly over 5000 km and above 8500 meters high to reach the sanctuary.

153 species of avifauna belonging to 33 facilities have been identified here. Some of the major migratory birds during the season are greylag goose, northern pintail, cotton teal, red-crested pochard, gadwall, northern shoveler, Eurasian coot and mallard.

Some major local migratory and residential birds are sarus crane, painted stork, Indian peafowl, white ibis, little grebe, fulvous whistling duck, Asian openbill, white-necked stork, pheasant-tailed jacana, bronze winged jacana, grey-headed swamphen, northern lapwing, black drongo and Indian roller.

== Transport ==
The sanctuary is accessible by air, rail, and road. The nearest airport is Chaudhary Charan Singh International Airport in Lucknow, located approximately 130 kilometres away. By rail, the closest major transit hub is Gonda Junction (37 km), though smaller stations such as Mankapur (15 km) and Tikari (2 km) are situated closer to the wetland. The site is well-connected by road via Uttar Pradesh State Highways 1A and 9, as well as National Highway 330B, lying roughly 9 kilometres from Wazeerganj and 10 kilometres from Nawabganj.

== See also ==
- Wetlands in Indian cities
