= Pong Dam Lake Wildlife Sanctuary =

Sanctuary in Himachal Pradesh, India

Pong Dam Wild Life Sanctuary in Himachal Pradesh
- IUCN category IV (habitat/species management area)
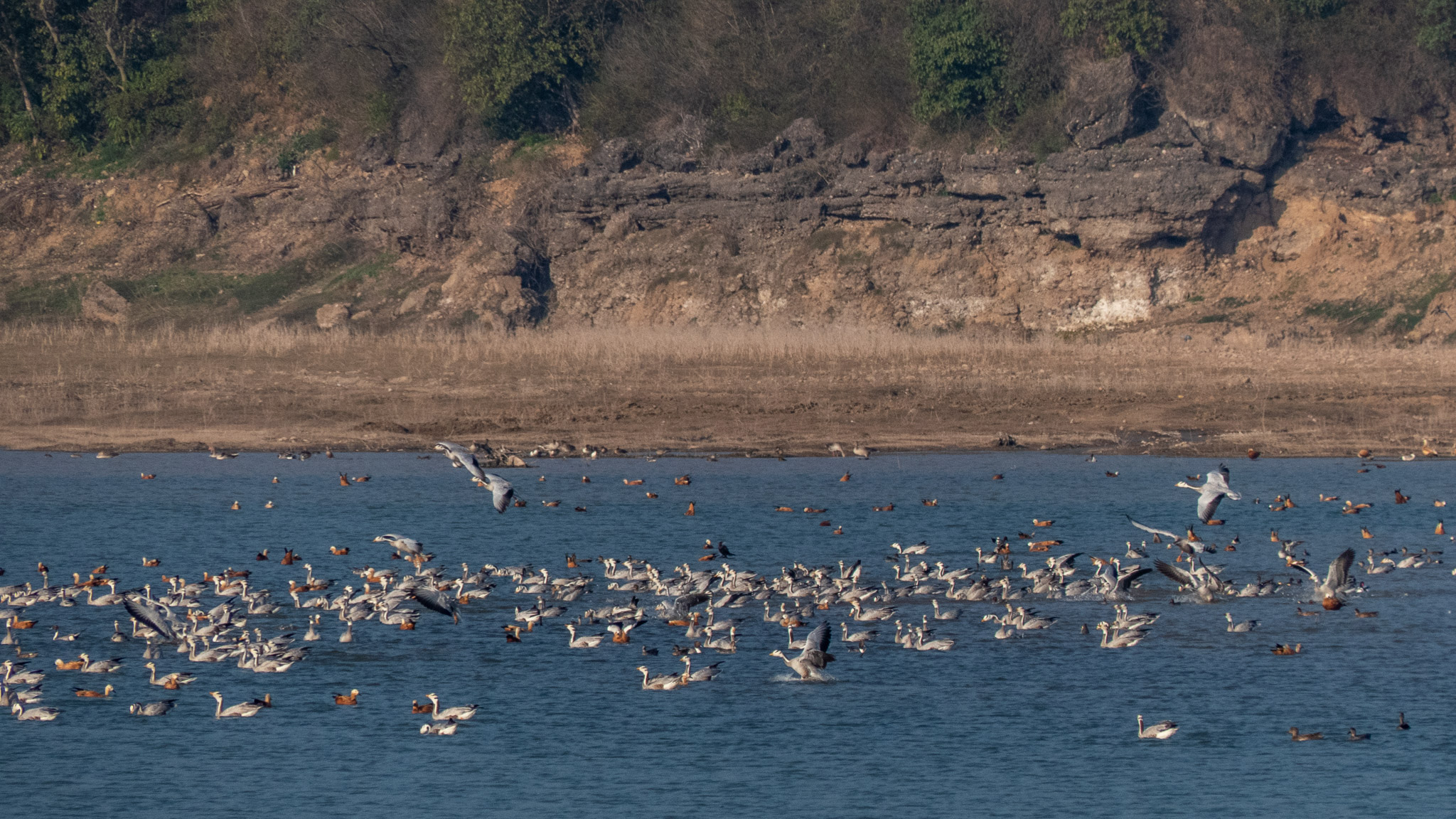
- Birds near Pong Dam

- Location within Himachal Pradesh Location within India
- Interactive map of Pong Dam Wild Life Sanctuary in Himachal Pradesh
- Location: Himachal Pradesh, India
- Nearest city: Talwara
- Coordinates: 32°01′N 76°05′E
- Area: 245 km^{2} (61,000 acres)
- Established: 1975
- Governing body: Himachal Pradesh

Ramsar Wetland
- Designated: 19 August 2002

Pong Dam Wild Life Sanctuary is a sanctuary in Himachal Pradesh, India. It covers 673 square kilometers. It was established in November 2002, under the Wildlife Protection Act of 1972. The sanctuary protects Maharana Pratap Sagar lake & wetland, which gained Ramsar Convention for International importance in 2002.

== Geography ==
220 bird species with 54 species of waterfowl and 27 fish species have been identified at Pong Dam Wild Life Sanctuary, located in the Kangra district of Himachal Pradesh in the 45 km long and 2 km wide stretch of the Beas River lake.

== Fauna ==
The main bird species reported are the bar-headed goose (Anser indicus), northern lapwing, ruddy shelduck, northern pintail, common teal, Indian spot-billed duck, Eurasian coot, red-necked grebe, black-headed gulls, plovers, black stork, terns, waterfowl, and egrets. The main animals spotted in area around lake are barking deer, sambar, wild boars, leopards, and oriental small-clawed otters. The main fish species are mahseer, catla, mirror carp, singhara.

== Flora ==
The main flora of the sanctuary: The tree species of the forest area are acacia, jamun, shisham, mango, mulberry, ficus, kachanar, amla, and prunus. A variety of shrubs, grasses, and climbers have also been reported.

== See also ==
- Bird sanctuaries of India
