= Samaspur Bird Sanctuary =

Protected wetland in Raebareli, India

Samaspur Bird Sanctuary समसपुर पक्षी विहार
- IUCN category IV (habitat/species management area)
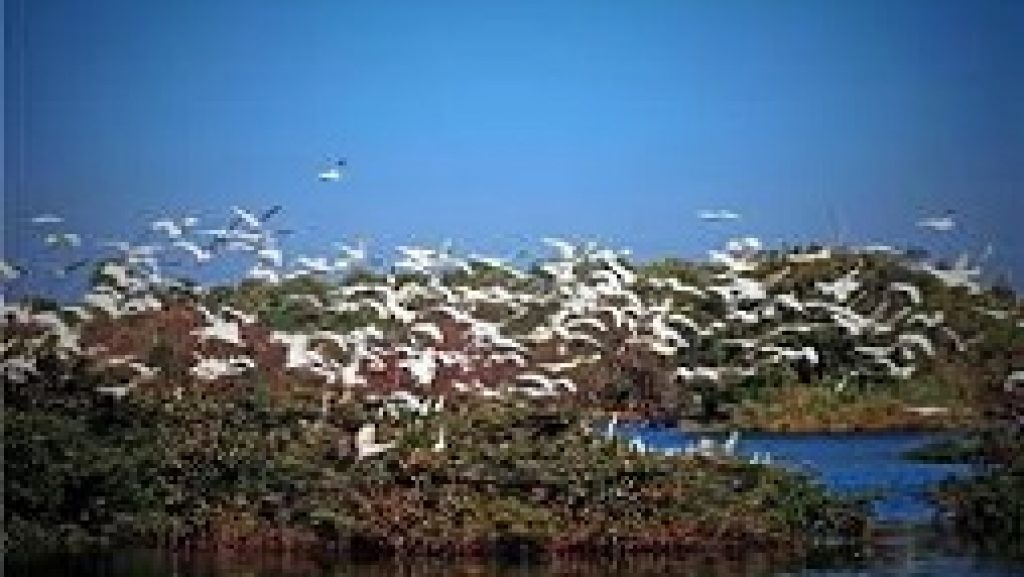
- A panoramic view of Samaspur Wetlands

- Location within Uttar Pradesh Location within India
- Interactive map of Samaspur Bird Sanctuary समसपुर पक्षी विहार
- Location: Salon, Raebareli, Uttar Pradesh, India
- Nearest city: Raebareli & Lucknow
- Coordinates: 25°59′45″N 81°23′30″E
- Area: 799.4 ha (1,975 acres)
- Established: 1987
- Governing body: Government of India

Ramsar Wetland
- Official name: Samaspur Bird Sanctuary
- Designated: 3 October 2019
- Reference no.: 2415

Samaspur Bird Sanctuary is a protected area situated near Salon in Raebareli district, Uttar Pradesh, India, about 122 km (76 mi) from Lucknow on Lucknow-Varanasi highway. It was established in 1987 on about 780 hectares of land. The nearest railway station is Unchahar and the nearest airport is Fursatganj. More than 250 varieties of birds can be seen there, some of which travel more than 5000 km to get there, including the greylag goose, pintail, common teal, Eurasian wigeon, northern shoveler, and ruddy shelduck (Surkhab). Local birds include the knob-billed duck, lesser whistling-duck, Indian spot-billed duck, Eurasian spoonbill, kingfishers, and vultures. There are twelve varieties of fish in the lake at Samaspur.
