= Satkosia Gorge =

Gorge in eastern Odisha, India

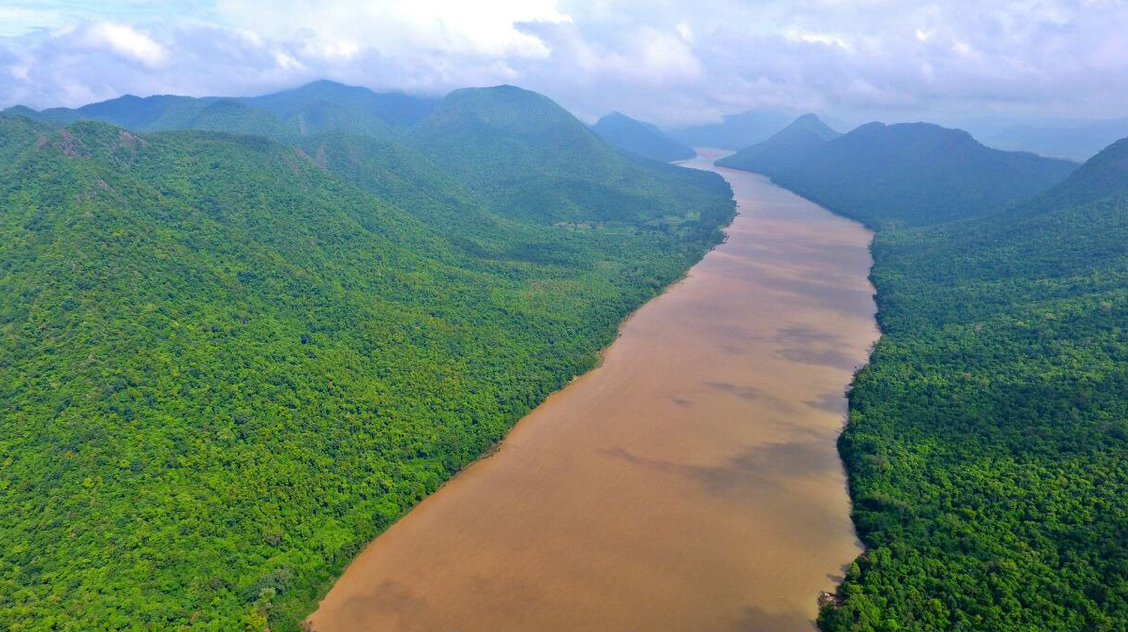
- Satkosia Gorge

- Location within Odisha
- Floor elevation: 236 feet (100 m)

Geography
- Coordinates: 20°36′15″N 84°46′34″E
- Rivers: Mahanadi River
- Interactive map of Satkosia Gorge

Designations

Ramsar Wetland
- Official name: Satkosia Gorge
- Designated: 12 October 2021
- Reference no.: 2470

Satkosia Gorge is a gorge in eastern Odisha, India, carved by the Mahanadi River. The gorge is located within the Satkosia Tiger Reserve which is a United nations Protected area. It is also a Ramsar site designated in 2021.

== Description ==
Satkosia Gorge is located along the border between Angul and Boudh districts of Odisha, India. It extends for a length of 22 km from Sunakhania village in Boudh to Badmul village downstream. It is a patchwork of rivers, tropical evergreen forests at the meeting point of the Deccan Peninsula and the Eastern Ghats. The habitats here support a variety of flora and fauna. Notable plant species include Asan (Terminalia alata), Dhaura (Anogeissus latifolia), Simili (Bombax ceiba), Indian thorny bamboo (Bambusa arundinacea) and Calcutta bamboo (Dendrocalamus strictus). Notable animal species include red-crowned roofed turtle (Batagur kachuga), Indian narrow-headed softshell turtle (Chitra indica), tiger (Panthera tigris) and black-bellied tern (Sterna acuticauda). The gorge is created by the Mahanadi river cutting the eastern Ghats. The gorge is approximately 22 km (14 mi) in length. The gorge and the surrounding area were declared as a tiger sanctuary in 2007.

== Geology ==
Geologically Satkosia gorge is part of the Eastern Ghats. It separates the Chhota Nagpur Plateau from the Eastern Ghats.

== Conservation and history ==
Satkosia Gorge was established in 1976 as a wildlife sanctuary.

== See also ==
- Geology of Odisha
- Geography of Odisha
- Satkosia Tiger Reserve
