= Tampara Lake =

Lake in Odisha, India

- Location within Odisha
- Location: Ganjam, Chhatrapur, Odisha
- Coordinates: 19.35°N 84.98°E
- Type: Freshwater Lake
- Basin countries: India
- Max. length: 5.4 km (3.4 mi)
- Max. width: 0.65 km (0.40 mi)
- Surface area: 300 ha (740 acres)
- Settlements: Chhatrapur

Ramsar Wetland
- Official name: Tampara Lake
- Designated: 12 October 2021
- Reference no.: 2489

Tampara Lake is a 300-hectare (740-acre) fresh water lake situated on the right bank of the Rushikulya River, near Chhatrapur, the district headquarters of Ganjam district, Odisha, India. It is 23 km (14 mi) from the city of Brahmapur.The lake is connected to the Rushikulya River. The flood waters from the river enriches its biodiversity, thus the wetland supports 60 species of birds and 46 fish species. The lake is instrumental in flood control during the monsoon season. The wetland is an important source of livelihood for the local population and also provides water for agriculture, drinking and transportation of local goods. Chhatrapur town also uses this lake's water for drinking purposes. Nowadays, this lake is used for water sports, Indian Army's water activities training centre. There are boating and recreation facilities on the site for tourism. The lake has been designated as a protected Ramsar site since 2021.
