= Nanjarayan Bird Sanctuary =

Wildlife Sanctuary in Tamil Nadu, India

- IUCN category IV (habitat/species management area)
- Location within Tamil Nadu Location within India
- Interactive map of Nanjarayan Bird Sanctuary
- Coordinates: 11°12′51″N 77°31′35″E
- Area: 1.26 km^{2} (0.49 sq mi)
- Established: 2022
- Governing body: Tamil Nadu Forest Department

Nanjarayan Bird Sanctuary or Nanjarayan Tank Bird Sanctuary is a protected area and bird sanctuary located in Tiruppur district of the Indian state of Tamil Nadu. It is recently added as ramsar site.The sanctuary covers an area of 1.26 km^{2} (0.49 sq mi) and was notified in 2022. It was designated as a Ramsar site of International importance in 2024.

It is a large shallow wetland. The lake derived its name from King Nanjarayan who repaired and restored the lake during his reign.
