= Koonthankulam Bird Sanctuary =

Protected area in Tamil Nadu, India

- IUCN category IV (habitat/species management area)
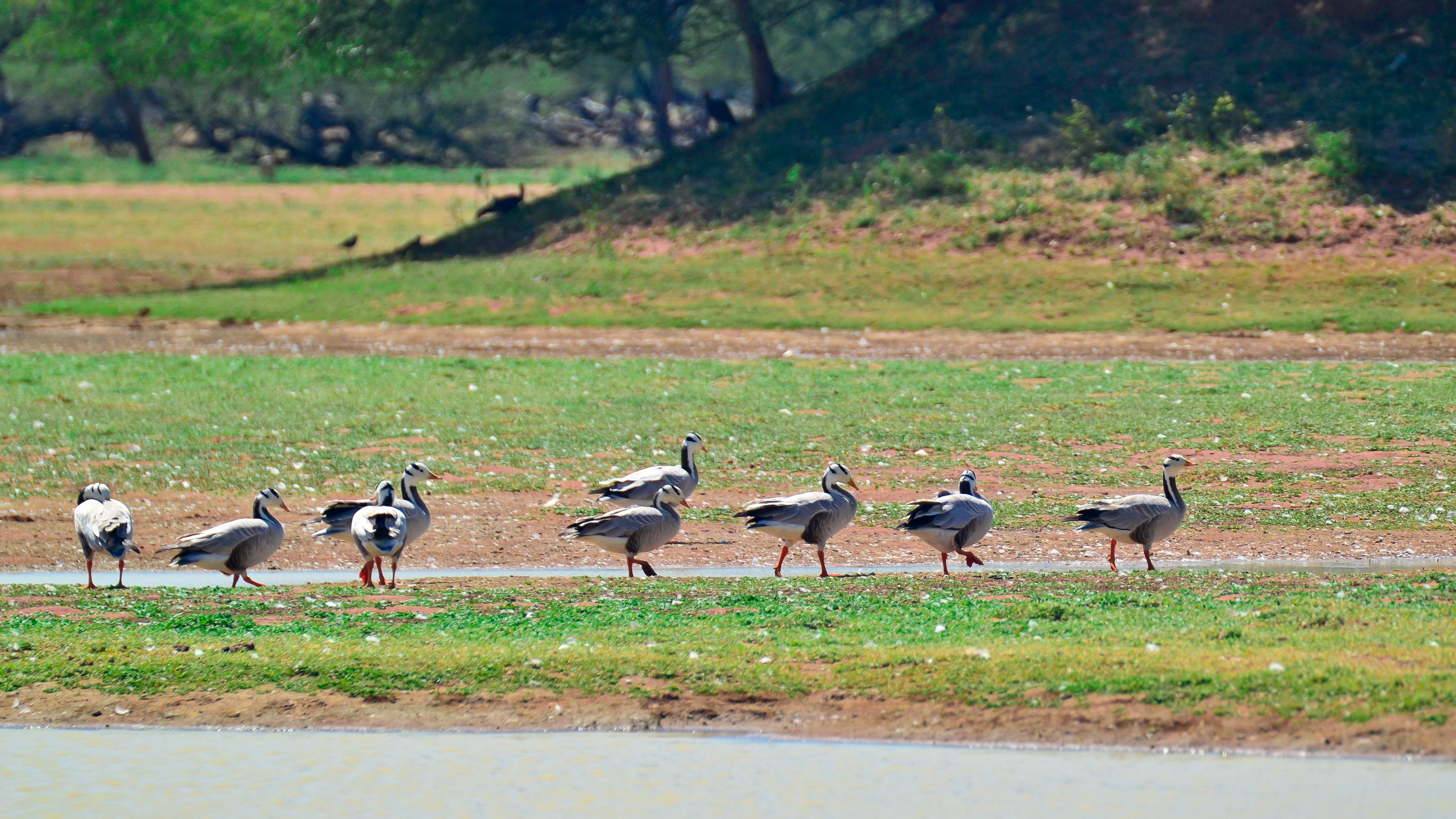
- Interactive map of Koonthankulam Bird Sanctuary
- Location: Tirunelveli, Tamil Nadu, India
- Area: 1.29 km^{2} (0.50 sq mi)
- Established: 1994

Ramsar Wetland
- Official name: Koonthankulam Bird Sanctuary
- Designated: 8 November 2021
- Reference no.: 2479

Koonthankulam Bird Sanctuary or Kunthankulam is a 1.2933 km^{2} (0.4993 sq mi) protected area declared as a sanctuary in 1994. It adjoins the tiny village of Koonthankulam in Nanguneri Taluk of Tirunelveli district, Tamil Nadu, India. It is just 38 km away from Tirunelveli (a bustling town on the banks of the Thamirabarani River). 8.58102°N 77.76123°E It is composed of Koonthankulam and Kadankulam irrigation tanks, conveniently linked by tar road. This is the largest reserve for breeding water birds in South India. It is an Important Bird Area, code: IN269, criteria: A1, A4i, and has been designated as a protected Ramsar site since 2021.

== Community involvement ==
This sanctuary is actively protected and managed by the Koonthankulam village community. The local people take a keen interest in protecting this sanctuary.

Birds coming to villagers' backyards are protected vehemently and regarded as harbingers of luck. The guano and silt from the tanks is collected by villagers in summer and applied as fertilizer to their fields. All villagers protect the birds, their nests and fledgelings. Fallen chicks are taken care of in the rescue centre till they are able to fly on their own. The Indian festival Diwali is not celebrated here because the sound of crackers would drive away the winged visitors.

An interpretation centre, watch tower, children's park and dormitory are open for public use throughout the year.

== Fauna ==
More than 43 species of resident and migratory water birds visit here every year. More than 100,000 migratory birds start coming by December and fly away to their northern homes by June or July after they lay and hatch eggs and the young ones mature enough to fly with the older ones.

The following migratory birds visit this area from other countries.

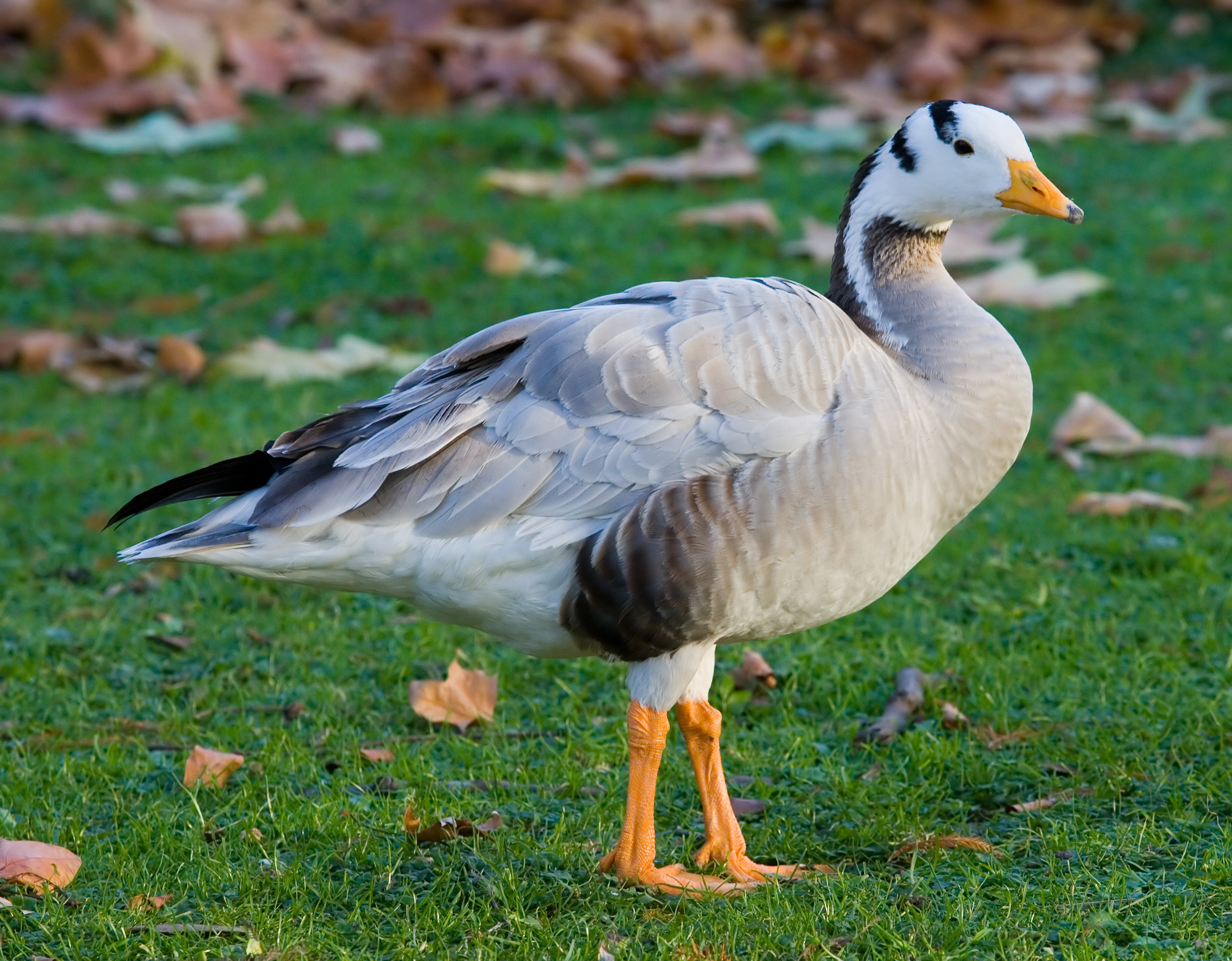
Bar-headed goose

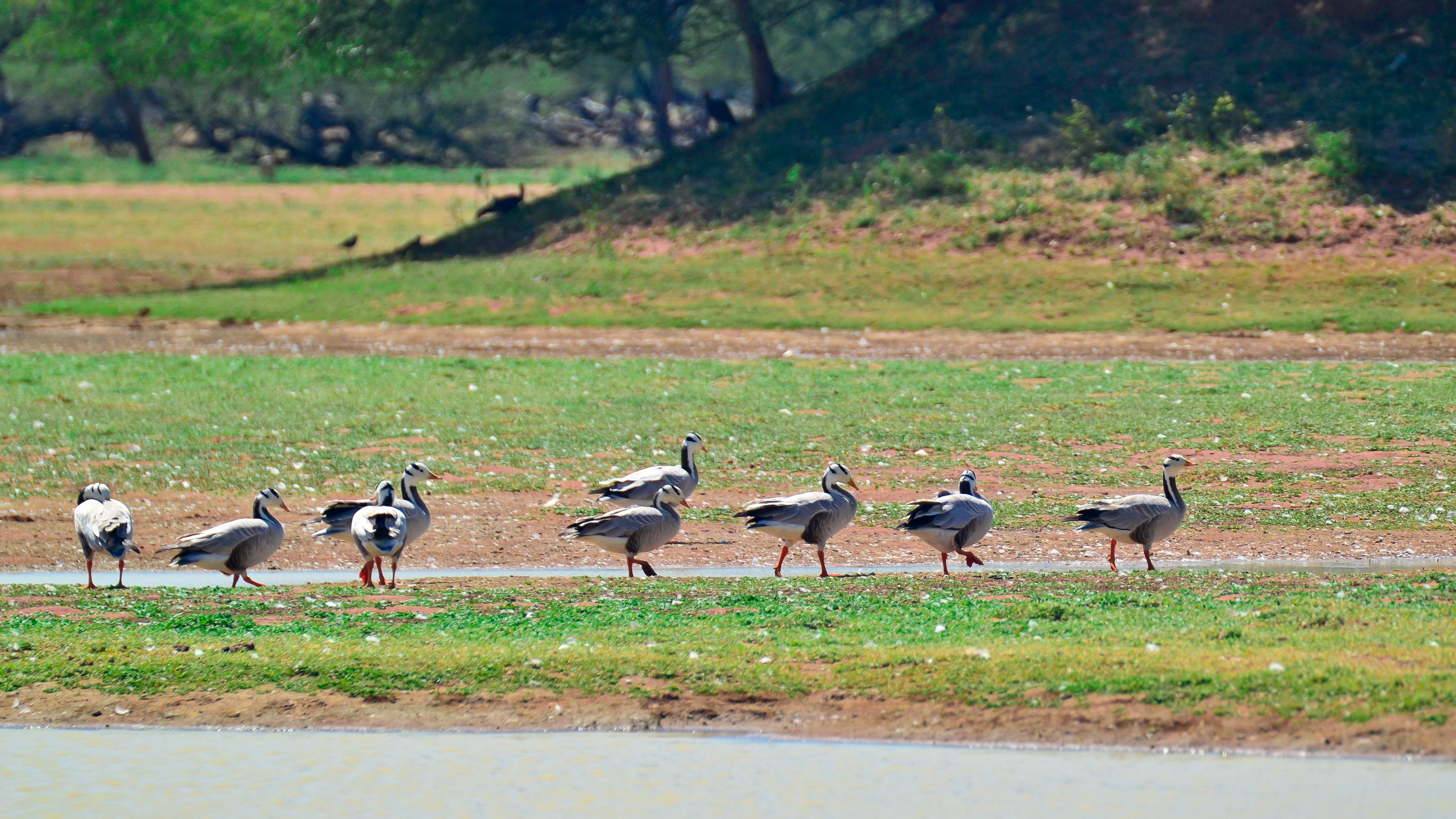
A flock of bar-headed geese (Anser indicus) at the lake in the sanctuary

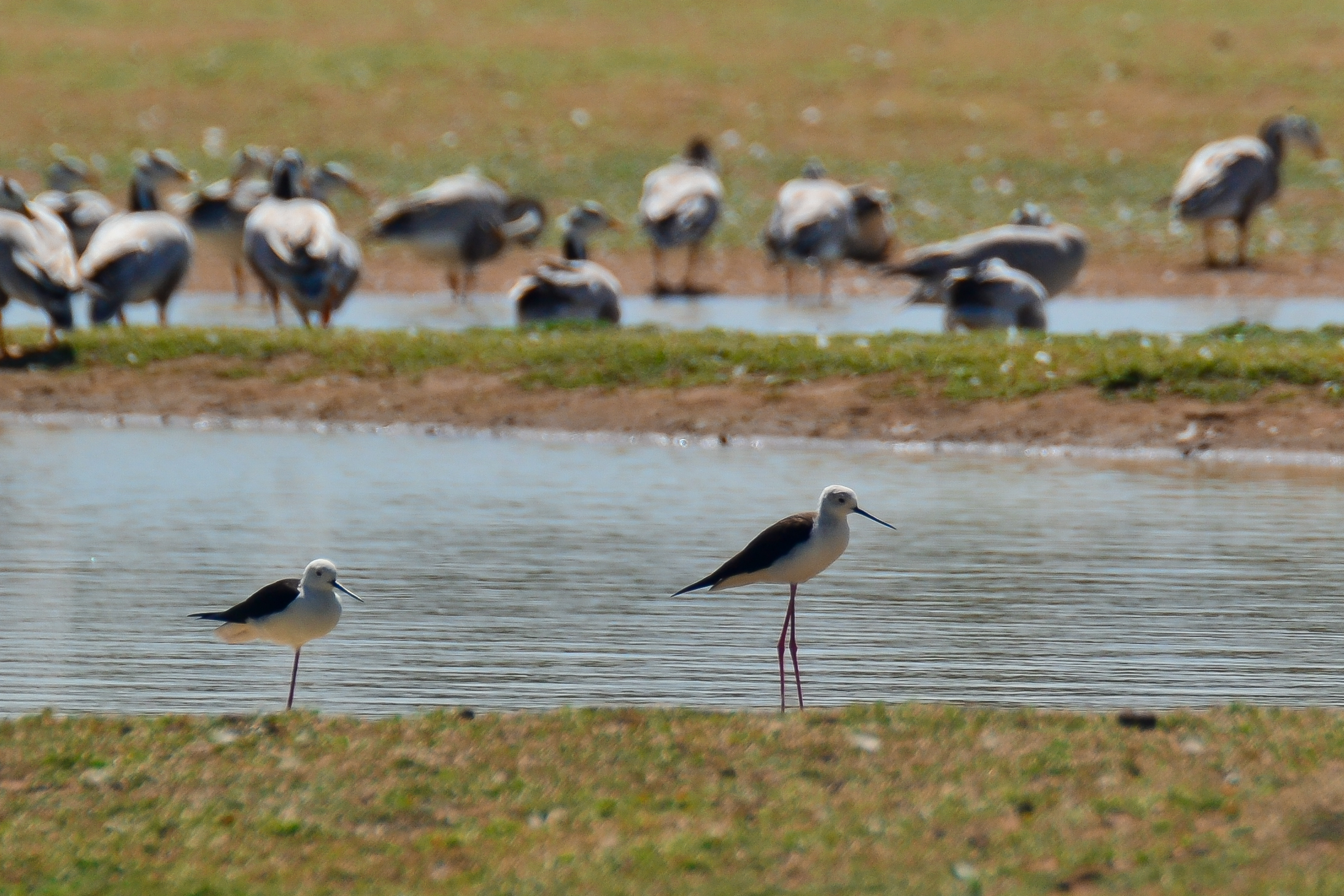
A pair of black-winged stilts (Himantopus himantopus) in the foreground with bar-headed geese in the background, at the sanctuary.

- Bar-headed goose, Siberia
- Common sandpiper, Siberia
- Common teal, Siberia
- Coot, central Siberia
- Green sandpiper, Siberia
- Greater flamingo, northern India
- Northern pintail, Siberia
- White stork, central Asia

== See also ==
- List of birds of Tamil Nadu
