= Karikili Bird Sanctuary =

- IUCN category IV (habitat/species management area)
- Location within Tamil Nadu Location within India
- Interactive map of Karikili Bird Sanctuary
- Location: Kancheepuram District, Tamil Nadu, India
- Coordinates: 12°35′51″N 79°50′34″E
- Area: 58.4 ha (144 acres)
- Established: 1988
- Governing body: Ministry of Environment and Forests, Government of India

Ramsar Wetland
- Official name: Karikili Bird Sanctuary
- Designated: 8 April 2022
- Reference no.: 2480

Karikili Bird Sanctuary is a 61.21-hectare (151.3-acre) protected area located in the Chengalpattu District of the state of Tamil Nadu, India. The sanctuary is about 75 kilometres (47 mi) from Chennai, south of Chengalpattu. About 100 species were recorded from this sanctuary

Karikili is situated about 10 km from Vedanthangal, and there are two tanks combined established as the bird sanctuary in 1988. This region is surrounded by open areas, paddy fields and scrub forest. Several migratory birds such as Northern Pintail, Garganey, Common Sandpiper were recorded from Karikili.

Karikili Bird Sanctuary along with Vedanthangal Bird Sanctuary has been identified as one of the Important Bird Areas of Tamil Nadu (IBA Site Code-29, A1, IBA criteria – A4iii). Several waterbirds use Vedanthangal as a nesting site and Karikili as a foraging site. The sanctuary has been designated as a protected Ramsar site since 2022.
