= Wetlands in Indian Cities =

Wetlands in India are diverse ecosystems that include lakes, marshes, mangroves, floodplains, estuaries, peatlands, and human-made water bodies such as reservoirs and tanks. They occur across a wide range of climatic and geographic regions, from the Himalayan highlands and Indo-Gangetic plains to the Deccan Plateau and coastal belts. Wetlands play a critical role in biodiversity conservation, water regulation, groundwater recharge, flood mitigation, and supporting livelihoods.

India is a contracting party to the Ramsar Convention on Wetlands and has designated several wetlands of international importance. In addition to large and well-known wetlands, a significant number of smaller wetlands exist within and around cities and towns, where they have historically contributed to urban water supply, stormwater management, groundwater recharge, and local microclimatic regulation. Urban wetlands also support biodiversity within built-up areas and provide ecosystem services that are increasingly relevant in the context of urbanisation and climate variability. Documentation and protection of such urban wetlands, however, remains uneven across the country.

== Definition and classification ==
=== Definition ===
In the context of cities and towns, urban wetlands refer to natural or human-made wetland ecosystems that occur within, or in close functional association with, urban and peri-urban areas. These include lakes, marshes, floodplains, estuaries, and water bodies that are influenced by urban land use, infrastructure, and governance arrangements. International and national definitions of wetlands, such as those under the Ramsar Convention and Indian policy frameworks, apply to urban wetlands insofar as they recognise both natural and artificial wetlands, permanent or seasonal, located within built-up environments.

=== Urban wetlands in India ===
Urban wetlands include lakes, ponds, marshes, floodplains, and drainage channels located within or adjacent to cities and towns. Historically, these wetlands were integral to urban planning, supporting water supply, agriculture, and stormwater management. In contemporary Indian cities, urban wetlands face pressures from land conversion, pollution, encroachment, and fragmentation.

Governance of urban wetlands is often complex, involving multiple agencies such as urban local bodies, irrigation departments, forest departments, and state wetland authorities. While some urban wetlands have received legal protection or restoration attention, many remain unnotified and poorly documented.

== Loss of wetlands ==
India has lost approximately 40% of its wetland area over the past three decades, with 50% of its remaining wetlands showing signs of ecological degradation. Urban losses have been particularly severe: cities like Chennai have lost approximately 85% of their wetlands, Mumbai approximately 71%, and Kolkata approximately 36%. These losses have contributed directly to increased urban flooding frequency, water scarcity, and biodiversity decline in these cities. Man-made wetlands now constitute over 71% of India's remaining wetland area, which signals fundamentally alteration by human intervention. Ecological health assessments show that only 19% of evaluated wetlands are rated 'Very High' in ecological integrity, while the majority fall in moderate or poor condition categories, particularly in urban and industrial corridors.

Rapid urbanisation and changes in agricultural practice have eroded many of these systems, particularly in peri-urban areas where the pressure for land conversion is strongest. India's wetlands overall cover approximately 58.2 million hectares, but face increasing threats from urbanisation, industrialisation, and agricultural intensification. The 20th century recorded a 64-71% loss in global wetland area; in Asia alone, the loss amounts to approximately 2.65 million km², the largest of any world region, with India's wetlands forming a significant part of this threatened landscape.

== Major wetlands of India ==
India hosts several large and ecologically significant wetlands, including but not limited to:

- Ramsar sites designated under the Ramsar Convention
- Extensive mangrove ecosystems along the coasts
- Large freshwater and brackish wetlands supporting migratory birds and fisheries

== City-wise wetlands ==
In addition to large wetlands, many cities contain multiple wetlands that vary in size, ecological condition, and governance status. The following table provides an indicative, non-exhaustive overview of wetlands in selected cities.

Name of the wetland	City	Type of Wetland	Hydrological Source	Area	Description	Governing Authority	Urban Context	Primary Urban Function
Pichhola Lake	Udaipur	Artificial Freshwater Lake	Rain-fed; linked via channels to Fateh Sagar Lake and surrounding catchments	~6.96 km^{2} (varies seasonally)	Constructed in the 14th century; central historic lake around which Udaipur developed. Contains islands such as Jag Mandir and Lake Palace.	Udaipur Municipal Corporation; Rajasthan Water Resources Dept.	Part of Urban core	Tourism, cultural heritage, flood moderation, groundwater recharge
Fateh Sagar Lake	Udaipur	Artificial reservoir lake	Rain-fed; receives overflow from Pichhola via Swaroop Sagar	1 km^{2}	Built in 17th century; northern urban lake forming part of Udaipur's interconnected lake system.	Water Resources Department, Rajasthan	Part of Urban core	Drinking water (supplementary), recreation, urban cooling
Singanallur Lake	Coimbatore	Irrigation tank / wetland	Noyyal River basin	1.15 km^{2}	Major urban wetland supporting bird habitat; part of Coimbatore tank system.	Tamil Nadu PWD / Coimbatore Corporation	Part of Urban core	Flood buffering, biodiversity
Upper Lake (Bhojtal)	Bhopal	Man-made reservoir	Kolans River	31 km^{2}	Created in 11th century; principal drinking water source; part of Ramsar-designated Bhoj Wetland.	Bhopal Municipal Corporation / MP Wetland Authority	Part of Urban Core	Drinking water supply
Lower Lake (Chhota Talab)	Bhopal	Artificial lake	Linked to Upper Lake	1.3 km^{2}	Forms integrated wetland system with Upper Lake.	Municipal Corporation	Part of Urban Core	Urban drainage, biodiversity
East Kolkata Wetlands	Kolkata	Natural and man-made wetland complex (sewage-fed wetlands)	Fed by city wastewater canals; linked to Bidyadhari River system	~125 km^{2} (12,500 ha)	Large peri-urban wetland east of Kolkata that naturally treats municipal sewage through pisciculture and agriculture; designated Ramsar site (2002)	East Kolkata Wetlands Management Authority; Govt. of West Bengal	Peri-Urban	Wastewater treatment; fisheries; flood buffering; biodiversity
Ramgarh Tal	Gorakhpur	Natural lake / floodplain wetland	Rain-fed; historically linked to Rapti River floodplain	~7–8 km^{2}	Major urban lake within Gorakhpur city; important for flood moderation and drainage; subject to restoration and beautification initiatives	Gorakhpur Development Authority; Uttar Pradesh Irrigation Dept.	Part of Urban Core	Flood buffering; recreation; biodiversity
Rankala Lake	Kolhapur	Natural freshwater lake	Rain-fed; groundwater-fed	~1.07 km^{2}	Historic lake within Kolhapur city limits; major public promenade and urban biodiversity space	Kolhapur Municipal Corporation	Part of Urban core	Recreation; stormwater retention; urban cooling
Kukkarahalli Lake	Mysuru	Artificial lake	Rain-fed; stormwater inflow	0.62 km^{2}	19th-century urban lake located within Mysuru; important bird habitat and walking circuit	Mysuru City Corporation; Karnataka Forest Dept.	Part of Urban core	Biodiversity; recreation; groundwater recharge
Sagar Lake	Gwalior	Historic artificial lake	Rain-fed	~0.36 km^{2}	Urban lake near Gwalior Fort; historically part of city's water system	Gwalior Municipal Corporation	Part of Urban core	Cultural heritage; local recharge

== Threats and challenges ==
In the last four decades, India has lost nearly one-third of its natural wetlands to urbanisation, agricultural expansion and pollution.

Wetlands in Indian cities face multiple threats, including:

- Urbanisation and land conversion
- Pollution from sewage and industrial effluents
- Hydrological alteration and fragmentation
- Inadequate documentation and monitoring
- Climate-related impacts such as changing rainfall patterns

Urban wetlands are particularly vulnerable due to competing land demands and fragmented governance.

== See also ==
- Ramsar sites in India
- Mangroves in India
- List of waterfalls in India
