= Sauj =

Village in Uttar Pradesh, India

- Village
- Location in Uttar Pradesh, India
- Coordinates: 27.02309°N 79.14399°E
- Country: India
- State: Uttar Pradesh
- District: Mainpuri
- Tehsil: Karhal

Area
  - Total: 19.916 km^{2} (7.690 sq mi)

Population (2011)
  - Total: 7,957
  - Density: 399.5/km^{2} (1,035/sq mi)
- Time zone: UTC+5:30 (IST)

Sauj (Sauj) is a village in Karhal block of Mainpuri district, Uttar Pradesh. An old village going back at least as far as the late 1500s, Sauj was historically the seat of a pargana until 1840. It occupies a very large area and consists of many distinct hamlets besides the main site. As of 2011, Sauj has a population of 7,957, in 1,318 households.

== Geography ==
There is a large jheel close to the village.

As of 2011, Sauj covers an area of 1,991.6 hectares, of which 1,033.6 were currently farmland. 310.8 hectares were classified as cultivable wasteland, and another 3 were used as orchards; 0 hectares were used as pastures. 448 hectares were under non-agricultural use, and 14.7 were covered by forest.

== Sauj Jheel ==
Designations

Ramsar Wetland
- Designated: 18 June 2026
- Reference no.: 2603

Sauj Jheel is a shallow lake covering an area of approximately 41 ha (100 acres), located just north of Sauj village in the floodplains of the Ganga River. The lake forms part of a larger network of wetlands, contributing to ecological connectivity in the wider landscape, and is close to Saman Bird Sanctuary. The lake supports diverse wetland-associated vegetation, including the sacred lotus (Nelumbo nucifera) and the wild sugarcane (Saccharum spontaneum). These habitats provide nesting and breeding sites, as well as shelter and food resources, for a variety of animal species, especially for migratory birds numbering more than 30,000. Notable waterbird species recorded here include the vulnerable Sarus crane (Grus antigone) and Greater spotted eagle (Clanga clanga). The lake is an Important Bird and Biodiversity Area (IBA) of Birdlife International.

On 18 June 2026, the lake was designated as a Ramsar Site by the Ramsar Convention. The designation was officially announced on 15 October 2026 by the Ministry of Environment, Forest and Climate Change as India's 102nd Ramsar Site, making Mainpuri the only district in India to have two Ramsar sites alongside Saman Bird Sanctuary. The designation highlights the lake's global importance for wetland conservation, water security, climate resilience and ecological sustainability.

== History ==
Sauj is an old village built atop a khera (archaeological mound) with remains of an old fortress. It is mentioned in the Ain-i Akbari (c. 1595) as a mahal under sarkar Kannauj. It was listed with an assessed revenue of 1,200,000 dams and was expected to supply 3,000 infantry and 200 cavalry to the Mughal army.

Sauj remained the seat of a pargana until 1840, when it was broken up. Its 42 villages were reassigned to other parganas: 25 went to Mainpuri and 17, including Sauj itself, went to Karhal. At the turn of the 20th century, Sauj was described as a large and very dispersed village consisting of 26 different hamlets. It had a halqabandi school, and the old fort's ruins were still visible. The village's population as of 1901 was 2,797.

== Demographics ==
As of 2011, Sauj had a population of 7,957, in 1,318 households. This population was 53.2% male (4,230) and 46.8% female (3,727). The 0-6 age group numbered 1,223 (657 male and 566 female), or 15.4% of the total population. 1,749 residents were members of Scheduled Castes, or 22.0% of the total.

The 1961 census recorded Sauj as comprising 20 hamlets, with a total population of 3,053 people (1,525 male and 1,528 female), in 652 households and 497 physical houses. The area of the village was given as 5,030 acres and it had a post office at that point.

== Infrastructure ==
As of 2011, Sauj had 2 primary schools; it did not have any kind of healthcare facility. Drinking water was provided by hand pump and tube well; there were no public toilets. The village had a post office but no public library; there was at least some access to electricity for all purposes. Streets were made of both kachcha and pakka materials.
