= Udayamarthandapuram Bird Sanctuary =

- IUCN category IV (habitat/species management area)
- Location within Tamil Nadu Location within India
- Interactive map of Udayamarthandapuram Bird Sanctuary
- Location: Thiruvarur, Tamil Nadu, India
- Area: 0.45 km^{2} (0.17 sq mi)
- Established: 1998

Ramsar Wetland
- Official name: Udhayamarthandapuram Bird Sanctuary
- Designated: 8 April 2022
- Reference no.: 2476

Udayamarthandapuram Bird Sanctuary is a 0.45-square-kilometre (0.17 sq mi) protected area in Tiruvarur District, Tamil Nadu, India, at 10°26′59″N 79°27′58″E.

In 1999, this sanctuary was declared as a protected area. It has been designated as a protected Ramsar site since 2022.

== Fauna ==
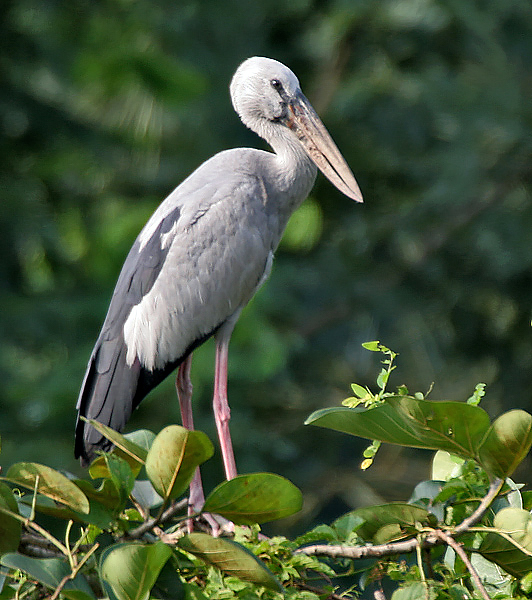
Openbill stork

A notable aspect of the sanctuary is the large number of purple moorhen and openbill storks during February and March.

== Notes ==
The Udayamarthandapuram Bird Sanctuary covers an area of around 0.45 square kilometres (0.17 sq mi) and is fed by an irrigation tank that receives water from the Mettur Dam. The tank remains dry between the months of April and August.

During the months of February and March, purple-moorhens and openbill storks can be seen here. Other migratory birds in the sanctuary include the white-ibis, Indian reef heron, white-necked stork, grey-heron, coot, night heron, purple-heron, little cormorant, spoonbill and darter.

From September through December, the bird population inhabiting the sanctuary rises to around 10,000 birds. The ideal season to visit this sanctuary is during the months of November and December.
