= Suchindram Theroor Birds Sanctuary =

Protected area in Tamil Nadu, India

Suchindram Theroor Vembannur Wetland Complex
- Location within Tamil Nadu
- Location: Tamil Nadu
- Coordinates: 8°10′45″N 77°27′45″E
- Lake type: Brackish
- Catchment area: 3 km^{2} (0 sq mi)
- Basin countries: India
- Max. length: 1.95 km (1.2 mi)
- Max. depth: 9 m (29.5 ft)
- Surface elevation: 0–19 m (62.3 ft)
- Settlements: Nagercoil, Tamil Nadu

Ramsar Wetland
- Official name: Vembannur Wetland Complex
- Designated: 8 April 2022
- Reference no.: 2474

Ramsar Wetland
- Official name: Suchindram Theroor Wetland Complex
- Designated: 8 April 2022
- Reference no.: 2492

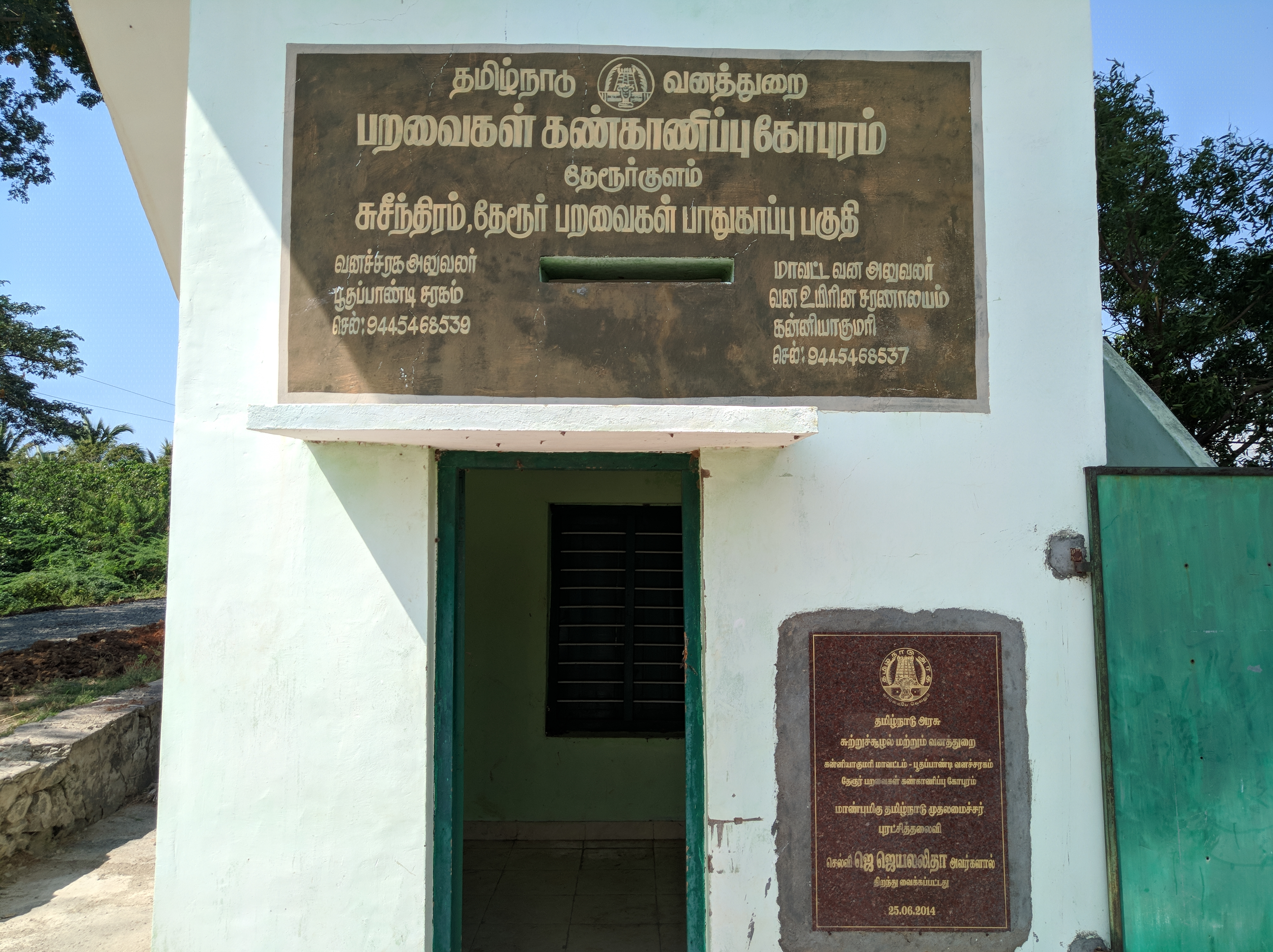
Bird watchtower in Suchindram Theroor Vembannur Wetland Complex

The Suchindram Theroor Vembannur Wetland Complex is a protected area comprising the Suchindram Kulam wetlands at 8°7′30″N 77°27′30″E, and the Theroor Kulam wetlands at 8°10′45″N 77°27′45″E, and the Vembannur Wetland Complex, all near Suchindram town in Kanyakumari District, Tamil Nadu, India. It is located between Nagercoil and Kanyakumari on the National Highway No. 47. Being at the extreme southern tip of India, this area underlies the southernmost continental range of the Central Asian Flyway. The sanctuary was proposed in 2002 and discussed by the Government. International name is Suchindram Therur, Vembanoor, Important bird area code no. IN279, criteria: A1, A4i. Parts of the sanctuary have been designated as protected Ramsar sites since 2022.

== District of Ponds ==
Kanyakumari Wildlife Sanctuary, a tiger habitat at the extreme southern end of the Western Ghats, is also in this district.

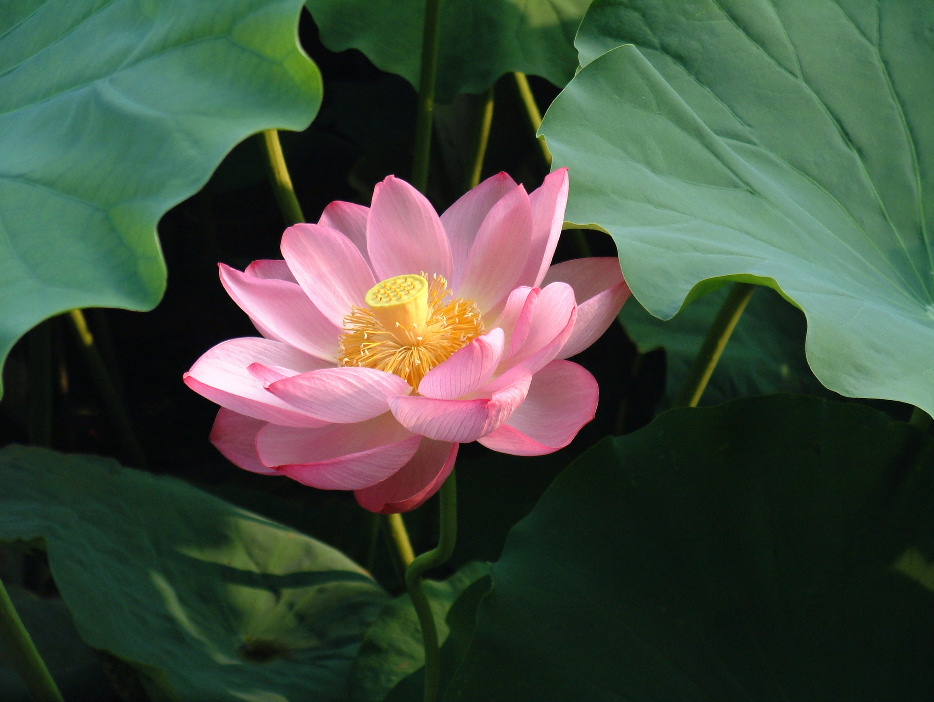
Lotus flower

== Fauna ==
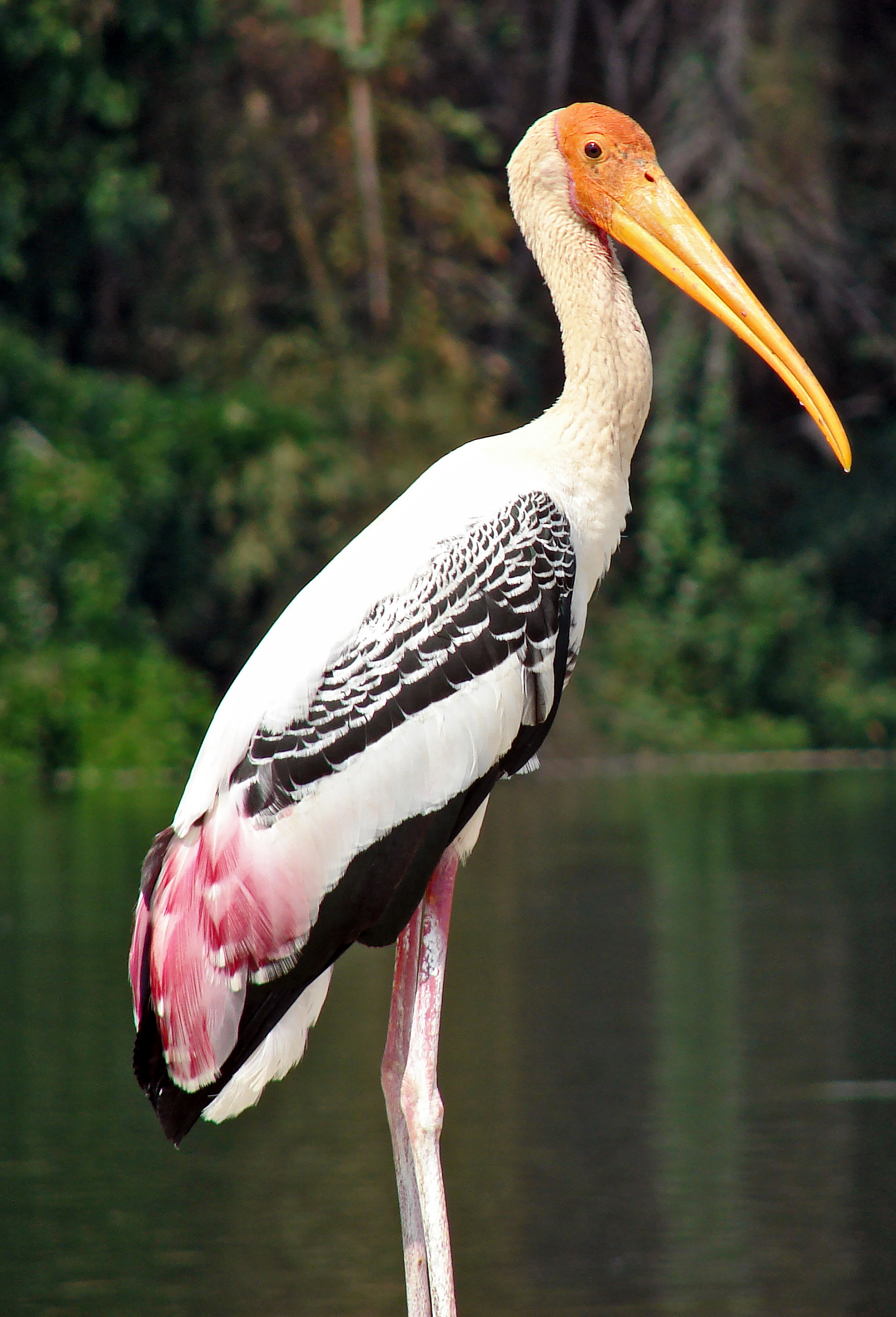
Painted stork

Suchindram is noted for the wide variety of migratory waterbirds that winter there. These include garganey, and the purple heron.

== Conservation ==
In 1993, the World Wildlife Fund gave Dr. Robert Grubh a Conservation Impact Grant. It was in cooperation with the Nature Conservancy, and the World Resources Institute.

During construction, there was disagreement between the government and the townspeople.
