= Conservation reserve =

Protected area set aside for conservation purposes

A conservation reserve is a protected area set aside for conservation purposes.

== Conservation reserves by country ==
=== Australia ===
In South Australia, a conservation reserve is a type of protected area declared under the Crown Land Management Act 2009 for parcels of 'land set aside for conservation of natural and cultural features.'

=== India ===
Conservation reserves and community reserves in India are terms denoting protected areas of India which typically act as buffer zones to or connectors and migration corridors between established national parks, wildlife sanctuaries and reserved and protected forests of India. Such areas are designated as conservation areas if they are uninhabited and completely owned by the Government of India but used for subsistence by communities, and community areas if part of the lands are privately owned. Administration of such reserves would be through local people and local agencies like the gram panchayat, as in the case of communal forests. (See Communal forests of India)

=== United States ===
In the United States the Conservation Reserve Program offers annual payments for 10-15 year contracts to participants who establish grass, shrub and tree cover on environmentally sensitive lands. It was reauthorized in the 1996 Farm Bill and the 2002 Farm Bill.

== See also ==
- Conservation movement
- List of conservation topics
- List of environmental issues
