= Cyperus alopecuroides =

Conservation status
- Least Concern (IUCN 3.1)

Scientific classification
- Kingdom: Plantae
- Clade: Tracheophytes
- Clade: Angiosperms
- Clade: Monocots
- Clade: Commelinids
- Order: Poales
- Family: Cyperaceae
- Genus: Cyperus
- Species: C. alopecuroides

Binomial name
- Cyperus alopecuroides Rottb. 1773

Species of plant

Cyperus alopecuroides, commonly known as the foxtail flatsedge, is a sedge of the family Cyperaceae that is native to parts of Africa, Asia and Australia.

== Description ==
The perennial and rhizomatous sedge typically grows to a height of 1 to 1.5 metres (3.3 to 4.9 ft). It has few glabrous culms that have triangular cross section. The culms are 22 to 140 cm (8.7 to 55.1 in) in length and have a width of 3.5 to 8.4 mm (0.14 to 0.33 in). The green leaves are crowded at the base of the plant and can be up to 100 cm (39 in) in length. The leaves have reddish-brown to blackish coloured sheaths that are 7 to 31 cm (2.8 to 12.2 in) in length. The linear shaped leaf blades are flat or W-shaped and taper to a slender point with a length of 37 to 75 cm (15 to 30 in) and a width of 4 to 15 mm (0.16 to 0.59 in).In Australia, the plant blooms between May and July producing yellow-brown flowers.

== Taxonomy ==
The species was first described in 1773 by the botanist Christen Friis Rottbøll in the work Descriptionum et Iconum Rariores. There are nine synonyms including Chlorocyperus alopecuroides, Cyperus bidentatus, Cyperus glomeratus, Juncellus alopecuroides and Juncellus pallidiflorus.

== Distribution ==
The plant is found in parts of Africa from Egypt to Eswatini in parts of Asia including Yemen, Saudi Arabia, Pakistan and India. It is also found in parts of northern Australia. It is often situated in seasonally wet grasslands, swamps, and old cultivations ranging from sea level to an altitude of 1,800 m (5,900 ft). In Western Australia, it is found around lakes and swamps in the eastern Kimberley region extending across northern parts of the Northern Territory and Queensland.

== See also ==
- List of Cyperus species
