= Wild Life (Protection) Act, 1972 =

Act of the Parliament of India

Parliament of India
- Long title: An Act to provide for the protection of Wild animals, birds and plants and for matters connected therewith or ancillary or incidental thereto.
- Citation: Act No. 53 of 1972
- Enacted by: Parliament of India
- Enacted: 9 September 1972
- Status: In force

The Wild Life (Protection) Act, 1972 is an Act of the Parliament of India enacted for the protection of plants and animal species. Before 1972, India had only five designated national parks. Among other reforms, the Act established scheduled protected plant and hunting certain animal species or harvesting these species was largely outlawed. The Act provides for the protection of wild animals, birds and plants; and for matters connected or incidental thereto. It extends to the whole of India.

It has six schedules which give varying degrees of protection. Schedule I and part II of Schedule II provide absolute protection - offences under these are prescribed the highest penalties. Species listed in Schedule III and Schedule IV are also protected, but the penalties are much lower. Animals under Schedule V (e.g. common crows, fruit bats, rats, and mice) are legally considered vermin and may be hunted freely. The specified endemic plants in Schedule VI are prohibited from cultivation and planting. The Enforcement authorities have the power to compound offences under this Schedule (i.e. they impose fines on the offenders). Up to April 2010, there have been 16 convictions under this act relating to the death of tigers.

== History ==
The "Wild Life (Protection) Act, 1972" was enacted by the Parliament of India in order to conserve animals, birds, plants connected therewith in 1972.

=== Amendments ===
Over the years, several amendments were made to the Act, which are as follows:

S. No.	Short title of amending legislation	No.	Year	Ref
1	Wild Life (Protection) Amendment Act,1982	23	1982	
2	Wild Life (Protection) Amendment Act, 1986	28	1986	
3	Wild Life (Protection) Amendment Act,1991	44	1991	
4	Wild Life (Protection Amendment Act, 1993	26	1993	
5	Wild Life (Protection) Amendment Act, 2002	16	2003	
6	Wild Life (Protection) Amendment Act, 2006	39	2006	
7	Wild Life (Protection) Amendment Bill, 2013		2013	
8	Wild Life (Protection) Amendment Bill, 2021		2021	
9	Wild Life (Protection) Amendment Act, 2022	18	2022	

== Definitions under the Act (Section 2) ==
- "animal" includes amphibians, birds, mammals, and reptiles, and their young ones, and also includes, in the cases of birds and reptiles, their eggs.
- "animal article" means an article made from any captive or wild animal, other than vermin, and includes an article or object in which the whole or any part of such animal has been used and an article made therefrom.
- "hunting" includes

(a) capturing, killing, poisoning, snaring, or trapping any wild animal, and every attempt to do so
(b) driving any wild animal for any of the purposes specified in sub clause
(c) injuring, destroying or taking any body part of any such animal, or in the case of wild birds or reptiles, disturbing or damaging the eggs or nests of such birds or reptiles.

- "taxidermy" means the curing, preparation or preservation of trophies.
- "trophy" means the whole or any part of any captive or wild animal (other than vermin) which has been kept or preserved by any means, whether artificial or natural. This includes:

(a) rugs, skins, and specimens of such animals mounted in whole or in part through a process of taxidermy
(b) antler, horn, rhinoceros horn, feather, nail, tooth, musk, eggs, and nests and shells.

- "uncured trophy" means the whole or any part of any captive animal (other than vermin) which has not undergone a process of taxidermy. This includes a freshly killed wild animal, ambergris, musk and other animal products.
- "vermin" means any wild animal specified in Schedule V.
- "wildlife" includes any animal, bees, butterflies, crustacean, fish and moths; and aquatic or land vegetation which forms part of any habitat
- Many non-endangered species, such as Papilio buddha, are also protected.

== Hunting (Section 9) ==
This section describes what constitutes hunting and the intent to hunt. Hunting wild animals is prohibited by law in India.

== Ownership (Section 40 & 42) ==
Regarding ownership issues and trade licences - Ownership will be not transferred to another party also regarding issues to trade licence. The certificate of ownership will be provided by the chief wild life warden.

== Penalties (Section 51) ==
Penalties are predescribed in section 51. Enforcement can be performed by agencies such as the Forest Department, the Wildlife Crime Control Bureau (WCCB), the Customs and the Central Bureau of Investigation (CBI). Chargesheets can be filed directly by the Forest Department. Other enforcement agencies, often due to the lack of technical expertise, hand over cases to the Forest Department.

== 2002 Amendment ==
The 2002 Amendment Act which came into force in January 2003 have made punishment and penalty for offences under the Act more stringent.

=== Offence ===
For offences relating to wild animals (or their parts and products) included in schedule-I or part II of Schedule- II and those relating to hunting or altering the boundaries of a sanctuary or national park the punishment and penalty have been enhanced, the minimum imprisonment prescribed is three years which may extend to seven years, with a minimum fine of Rs. 10,000/-. For a subsequent offence of this nature, the term of imprisonment shall not be less than three years but may extend to seven years with a minimum fine of Rs. 25,000. Also a new section (51 - A) has been inserted in the Act, making certain conditions applicable while granting bail: 'When any person accused of the commission of any offence relating to Schedule I or Part II of Schedule II or offences relating to hunting inside the boundaries of National Park or Wildlife Sanctuary or altering the boundaries of such parks and sanctuaries, is arrested under the provisions of the Act, then not withstanding anything contained in the Code of Criminal Procedure, 1973, no such person who had been previously convicted of an offence under this Act shall be released on bail unless:

(a) The Public Prosecutor has been given an opportunity of opposing the release on bail; and - (b) Where the Public Prosecutor opposes the application, the Court is satisfied that there are reasonable grounds for believing that he is not guilty of such offences and that he is not likely to commit any offence while on bail".

In order to improve the intelligence gathering in wildlife crime, the existing provision for rewarding the informers has been increased from 20% of the fine and composition money respectively to 50% in each case. In addition to this, a reward up to Rs. 10,000/- is also proposed to be given to the informants and others who provide assistance in detection of crime and apprehension of the offender.

At present, persons having ownership certificate in respect of Schedule I and Part II of Schedule II animals, can sell or gift such articles. This has been amended with a view to curb illegal trade, and thus no person can now acquire Schedule I or Part II of Schedule II animals, articles or trophies except by way of inheritance (except live elephants).

Stringent measures have also been proposed to forfeit the properties of hardcore criminals who have already been convicted in the past for heinous wildlife crimes. These provisions are similar to the provisions of 'Narcotic Drugs and Psychotropic Substances Act, 1985'. Provisions have also been made empowering officials to evict encroachments from Protected Areas.

=== Offences not pertaining to hunting of endangered species ===
Offences related to trade and commerce in trophies, animals articles etc. derived from certain animals (exception: chapter V A and section 38J) attracts a term of imprisonment up to three years and/or a fine up to Rs. 25,000/-.

== Criticism ==
Naturalist Peter Smetacek, member of the Kerala State Board for Wildlife (SBWL), criticised the act and its far-reaching hunting restrictions specifically as oppressive towards the rural population as well as scientists and as ineffective in achieving its goals in conservation (e.g. by creating counterproductive incentives and bringing peasants to set fire to forests in order to limit population growth of nuisance wildlife like wild boar). Smetacek further characterized the act as coming into existence in the context of the political move against the erstwhile Indian nobility (among whose traditional pastimes was hunting for thousands of years), then Prime Minister of India Indira Gandhi's romanticized view of nature, and India's extensive system of licensing and regulation in the 1970s, known as the Licence Raj.
