= Bird sanctuaries of India =

Bird sanctuaries are nature facilities that advocate the conservation of various species of birds and their natural habitats while promoting rehabilitation and survival

== List of bird sanctuaries of India ==
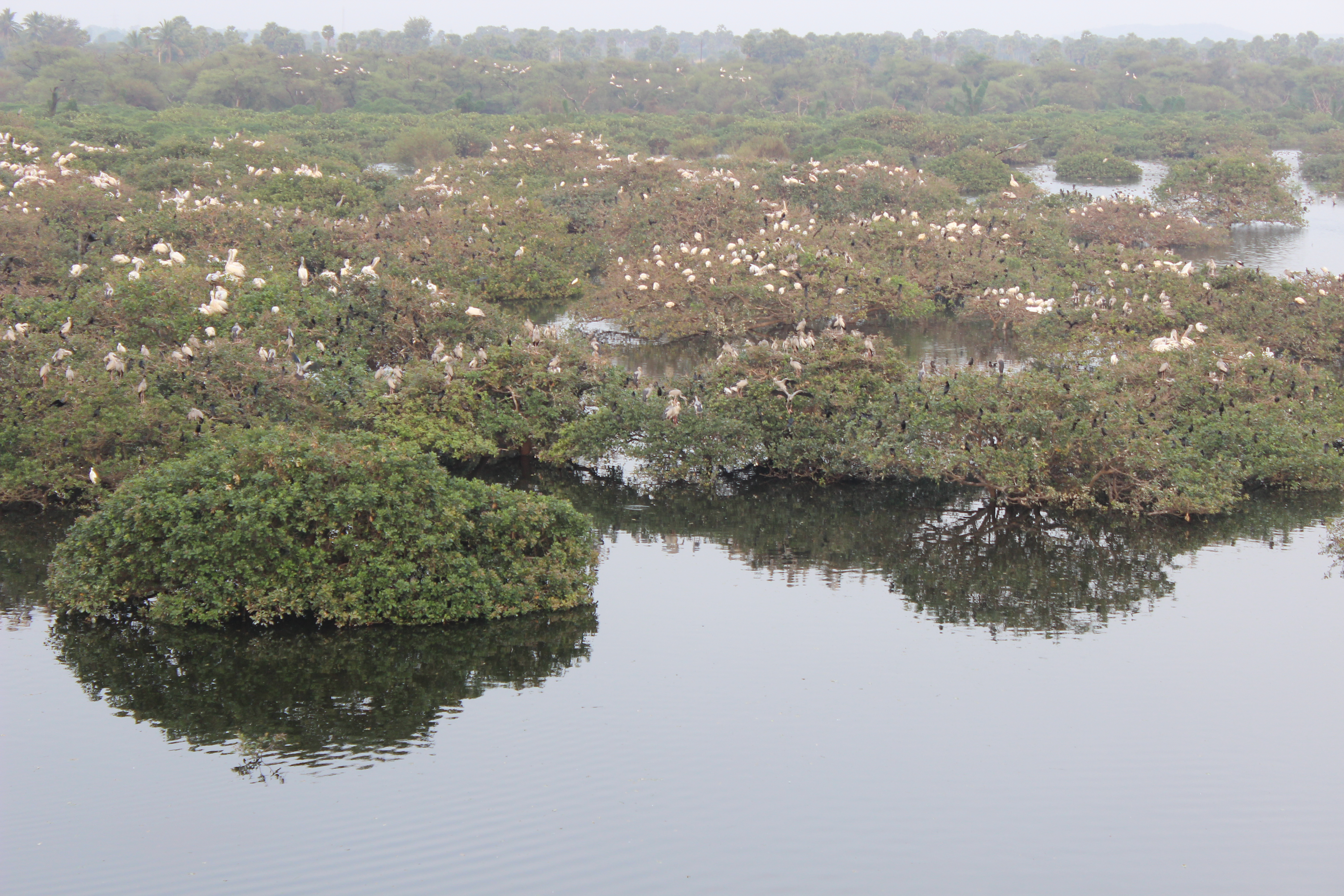
Vedanthangal bird sanctuary View from Watch Tower

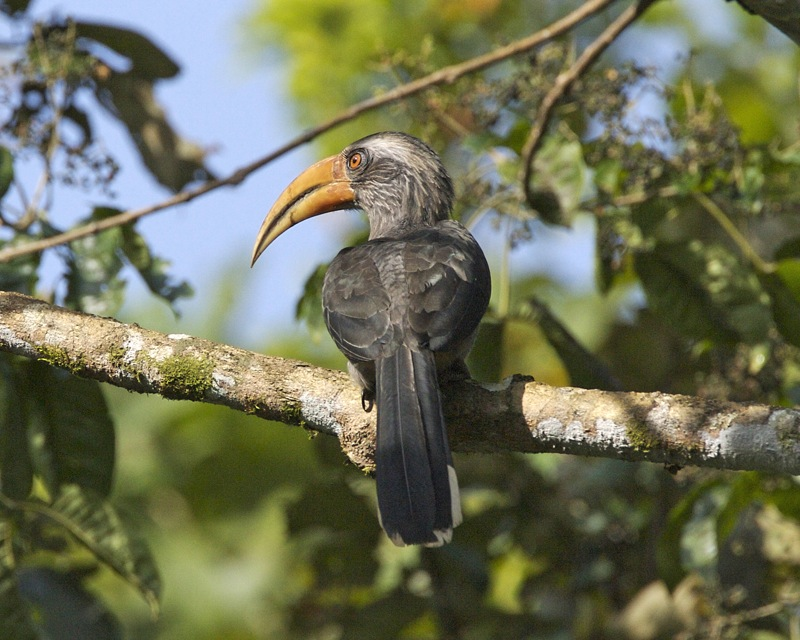
Malabar grey-hornbill (Ocyceros griseus) at Thattekad, Kerala

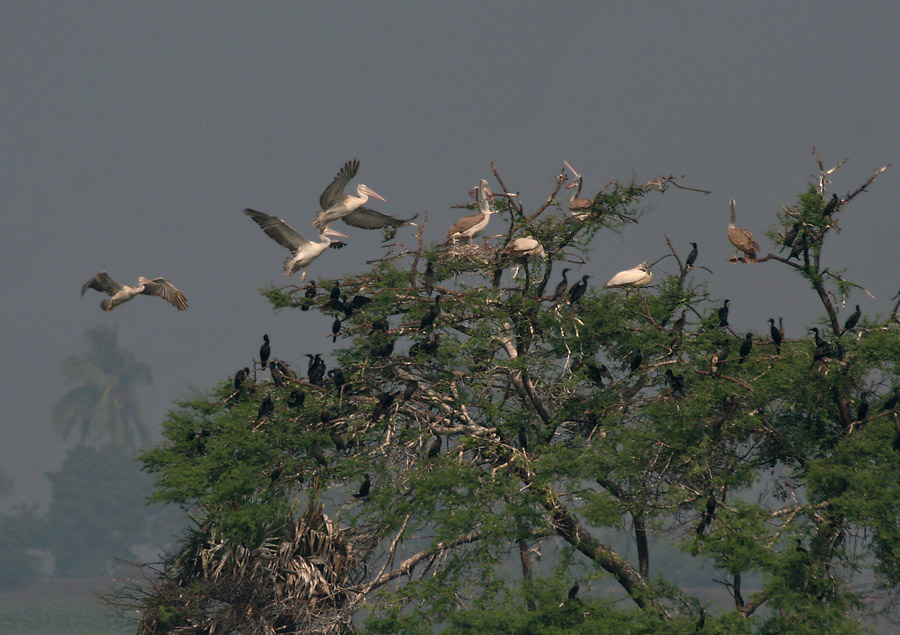
spot-billed pelican (Pelecanus philippensis) at nest at Atapaka in Kolleru W IMG 3738

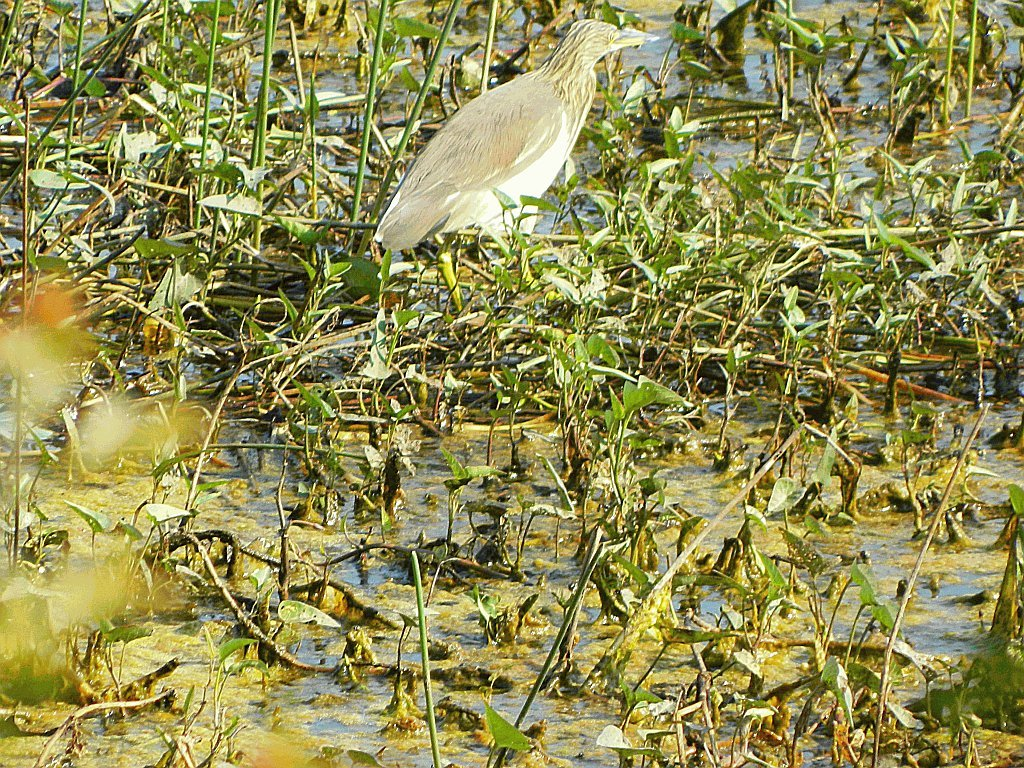
Birds at Nawabganj Bird Sanctuary, Unnao

Sl No	Name	State/Union territory
1	Atapaka Bird Sanctuary	Andhra Pradesh
2	Nelapattu Bird Sanctuary	Andhra Pradesh
3	Pulicat Lake Bird Sanctuary	Andhra Pradesh
4	Sri Penusila Narasimha Wildlife Sanctuary	Andhra Pradesh
5	Uppalapadu Bird Sanctuary	Andhra Pradesh
6	Kondakarla Ava Bird Sanctuary	Andhra Pradesh
7	Nagi Dam Bird Sanctuary	Bihar
8	Najafgarh drain bird sanctuary	Delhi
9	Salim Ali Bird Sanctuary	Goa
10	Gaga Wildlife Sanctuary	Gujarat
11	Khijadiya Bird Sanctuary	Gujarat
12	Kutch Bustard Sanctuary	Gujarat
13	Nal Sarovar Bird Sanctuary	Gujarat
14	Porbandar Bird Sanctuary	Gujarat
15	Thol Lake	Gujarat
16	Bhindawas Wildlife Sanctuary	Haryana
17	Khaparwas Wildlife Sanctuary	Haryana
18	Gamgul	Himachal Pradesh
19	Attiveri Bird Sanctuary	Karnataka
20	Bankapura	Karnataka
21	Bankapura Peacock Sanctuary	Karnataka
22	Bonal Bird Sanctuary	Karnataka
23	Gudavi Bird Sanctuary	Karnataka
24	Kaggaladu Bird Sanctuary	Karnataka
25	Kokrebellur Bird Sanctuary	Karnataka
26	Magadi Bird Sanctuary	Karnataka
27	Mandagadde Bird Sanctuary	Karnataka
28	Puttenahalli Lake	Karnataka
29	Ranganathittu Bird Sanctuary	Karnataka
30	Kadalundi Bird Sanctuary	Kerala
31	Kumarakom Bird Sanctuary	Kerala
32	Mangalavanam Bird Sanctuary	Kerala
33	Pathiramanal	Kerala
34	Thattekad Bird Sanctuary	Kerala
35	Mayani Bird Sanctuary	Maharashtra
36	Karnala Bird Sanctuary	Maharashtra
37	Great Indian Bustard Sanctuary	Maharashtra
38	Lengteng Wildlife Sanctuary	Mizoram
39	Chilika Lake	Odisha
40	Keoladeo National Park	Rajasthan
41	Tal Chhapar Sanctuary	Rajasthan
42	Chitrangudi Bird Sanctuary	Tamil Nadu
43	Kanjirankulam Bird Sanctuary	Tamil Nadu
44	Koothankulam Bird Sanctuary	Tamil Nadu
45	Suchindram Theroor Birds Sanctuary	Tamil Nadu
46	Udayamarthandapuram Bird Sanctuary	Tamil Nadu
47	Vedanthangal Bird Sanctuary	Tamil Nadu
48	Vellode Birds Sanctuary	Tamil Nadu
49	Vettangudi Bird Sanctuary	Tamil Nadu
50	Sarsai Nawar Wetland	Uttar Pradesh
51	Haiderpur Wetland	Uttar Pradesh
52	Lakh Bahosi Sanctuary	Uttar Pradesh
53	Nawabganj Bird Sanctuary	Uttar Pradesh
54	Okhla Sanctuary	Uttar Pradesh
55	Patna Bird Sanctuary	Uttar Pradesh
56	Saman Sanctuary	Uttar Pradesh
57	Samaspur Sanctuary	Uttar Pradesh
58	Sandi Bird Sanctuary	Uttar Pradesh
59	Chintamoni Kar Bird Sanctuary	West Bengal
61	Rasikbill Bird Sanctuary	West Bengal
60	Kulik Bird Sanctuary (Raiganj WLS)	West Bengal
62	Thasrana Bird Sanctuary (Dhanauri Wetlands)	Uttar Pradesh
63	Wachana Bird Sanctuary	Gujarat
64	Nandur Madhmeshwar Bird Sanctuary	Maharashtra
65	Hokera Wetland	Jammu and Kashmir
66	Oussudu Bird Sanctuary	Puducherry
67	Pong dam lake Bird Sanctuary	Himachal Pradesh
68	Gobind Sagar Bird Sanctuary	Himachal Pradesh
69	Surha Tal Bird Sanctuary	Uttar Pradesh
