= Uppalapadu Bird Sanctuary =

Bird sanctuary located in India

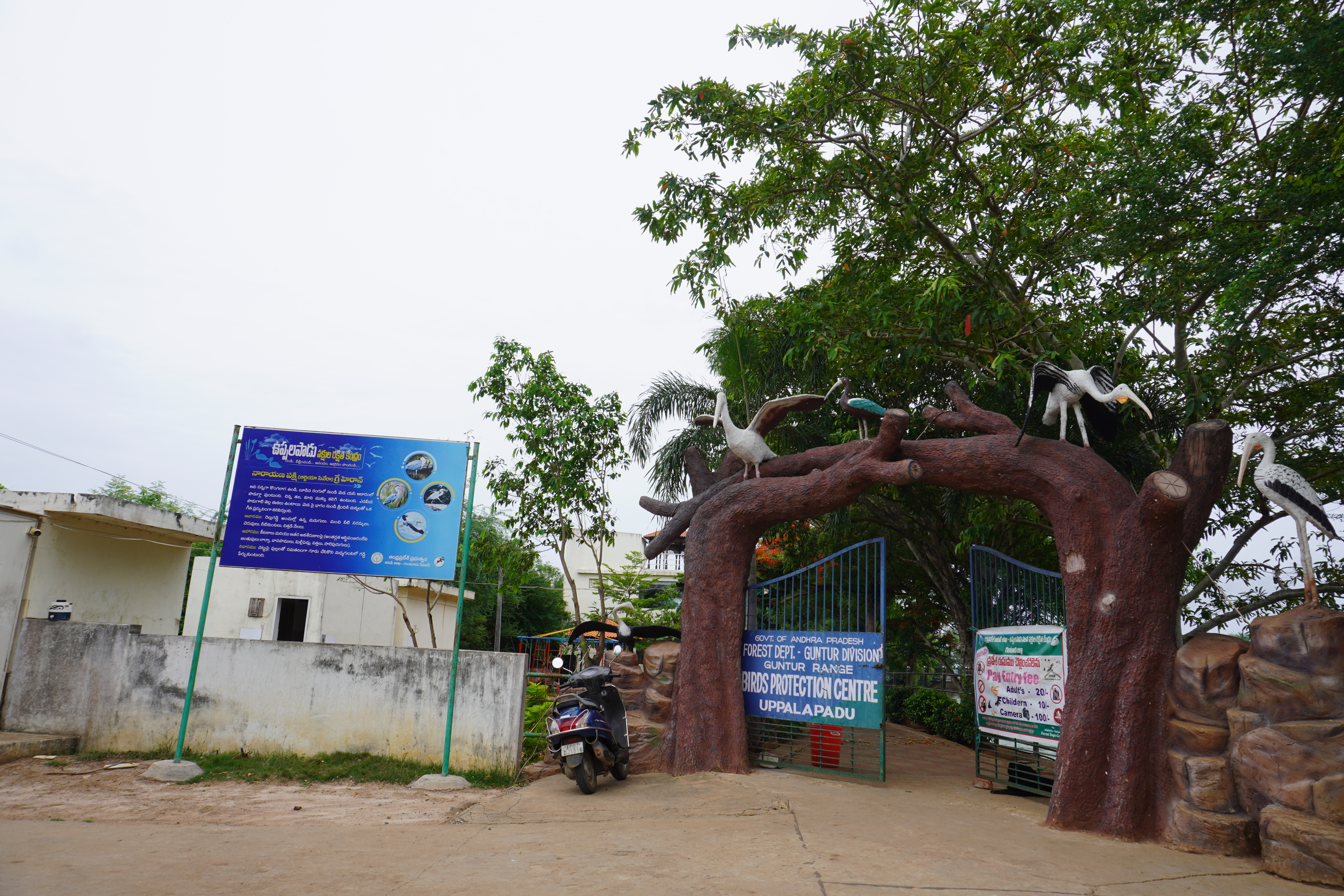
Entrance of the Uppalapadu Bird Sanctuary

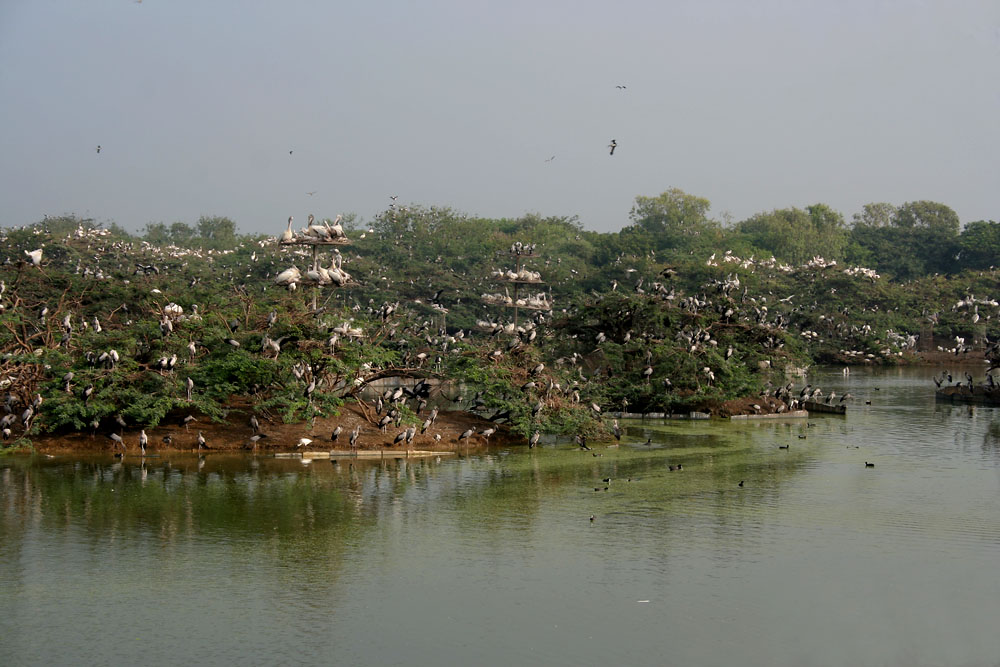
Heronry in Uppalapadu, Andhra Pradesh, India

The Uppalapadu Bird Sanctuary is located in Uppalapadu, near Guntur City, India. Painted storks, spot-billed pelicans and other birds that migrate from various countries such as Siberia and Australia use the village water tanks for nesting.

The bird population in these tanks used to be around 12,000 previously, however lately only about 7000 birds roost in this dwindling habitat through the year. But some initiatives have taken place such as adding artificial trees, local awareness, proper water supply to the ponds etc. The number of Pelicans, may be more than 1500. Besides this 6 pintail ducks a few cormorant 5 red crested pochard(rhodonesa rufina), common coot, common teal, black-headed ibises, 2 stilts were also sighted.

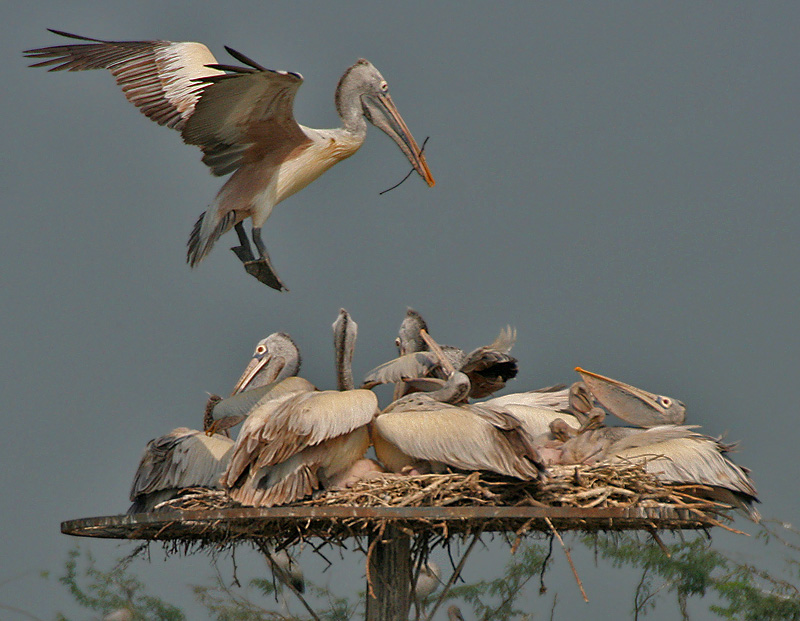
Uppalapadu Bird Sanctuary

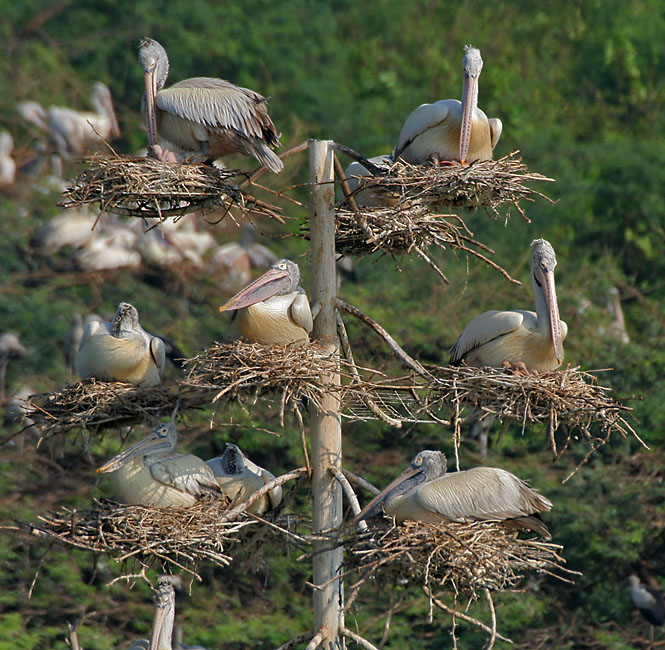
Spot-billed Pelicans Pelecanus philippensis in Uppalapadu

Instead of erecting wire mesh artificial-trees the forest department should plant more Prosopis velutina tree in and around this swamp. The ibises and painted stork were found scavenging on the left over rotten fish droppings of pelican along with jungle crow. The main diet being fed to the chicks was both fresh and sea water fish. Some of the fish, particularly LabeoRohita (Carp) and other sea fish, which had dropped from the nests, were fresh and about 0.8 kg in weight. They must have been brought from nearest river and sea which is about 20–30 km away from the site since the pelicans were not found fishing from nearby ponds. In 2009 the large wire mesh trees which were provided by the Forest department are being used for nest making by the pelicans, although they did not do so in the initial years. This pelicanary has completed ten years operation in 2009. Some pelicans have now opted to use another pond at Ramchandrapalem which is about 4 km from this site towards Guntur.

== See also ==
- Bird sanctuaries of India
