= Nelapattu =

Coordinates: 13°46′18″N 79°58′41″E

- village
- Interactive map of Nelapattu
- Country: India
- State: Andhra Pradesh

Languages
  - Official: Telugu
- Time zone: UTC+5:30 (IST)
- Vehicle registration: AP

Nelapattu is a small village in Doravarisatram mandal, Tirupati district, Andhra Pradesh, India. It is within 10 km of the town of Sullurpeta. It is best known for the Nelapattu Bird Sanctuary.

This bird sanctuary has a large nesting colony of spot-billed pelicans.
