= Haiderpur Wetland =

- Wetland
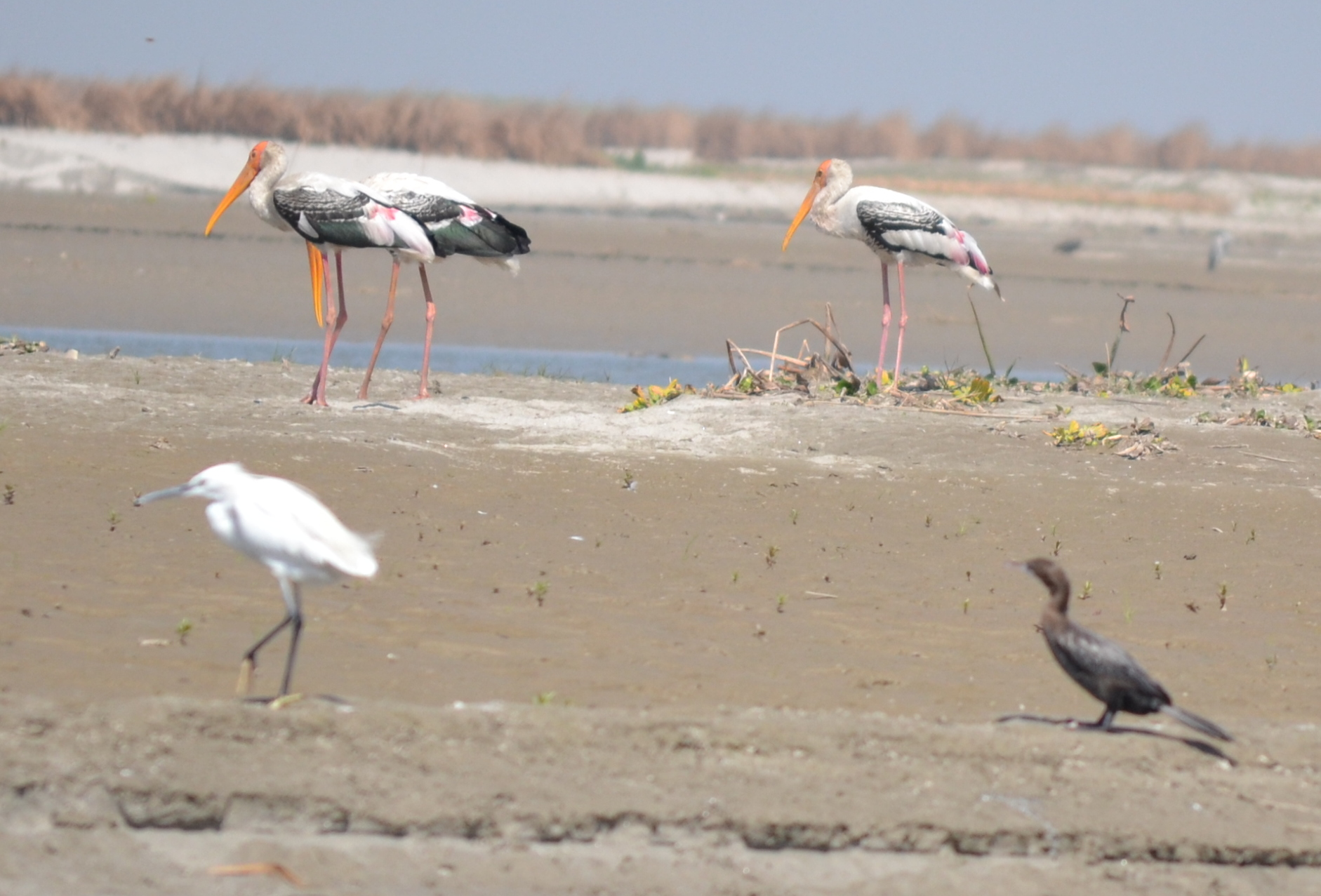

- Location in Uttar Pradesh, India Haiderpur Wetland (India)
- Coordinates: 29.376478°N 78.034001°E
- Country: India
- State: Uttar Pradesh
- Region: North India
- District: Muzaffarnagar district and Bijnor district
- Established: 1984

Ramsar Wetland
- Designated: 13 April 2021
- Reference no.: 2463

Government
  - Body: Uttar Pradesh Forest Department

Area
  - Total: 69 km^{2} (27 sq mi)
- Time zone: UTC+5:30 (IST)
- PIN: 251316
- ISO 3166 code: IN-UP

Haiderpur wetland is a UNESCO Ramsar site located near the Bijnor Ganga Barrage within the Hastinapur Wildlife Sanctuary in Uttar Pradesh, India.

== Formation and Geography ==
Haiderpur wetland is one of the largest human-made wetland that was formed in 1984 after the construction of Madhya Ganga Barrage. The region is fed by the Ganges and its tributary Solani river, constituting an area of 6908 hectare within the Hastinapur Wildlife Sanctuary in Muzaffarnagar and Bijnor districts. The wetland lies in the strategic Central Asian Flyway which is as an important stop over site for the winter migratory birds.

== Biodiversity ==
=== Bird species ===
The wetland is home to over 320 species of birds, which includes many globally threatened species. Commonly observed avian species includes, Partridge, Quail, Peafowl, Pigeon, Falcon, Hawk, Spot-billed duck, Crane, Eagle, Owl, White vulture, Cuckoo and Nightingale. Kingfisher, Myna, Red-vented bulbul, Sparrow, Baya weaver among others are also found in abundance in the wetland.

=== Other fauna ===
Among the mammals, Leopard, Wildcats, Monkeys, Fox, Wolf, Nilgai, Jackal, Mongoose, Honey badger, Barasingha, Wild boars, Rabbits, Muskrats and Bats inhabit the wetland and surrounding sanctuary region. Reptiles such as, Monitor lizard, Python, Indian cobra, Krait and Viper are found in large numbers. A significant population of IUCN Red List critically endangered Gharial (Gavialis gangeticus) and many vulnerable amphibian species are observed in the wetland and the adjoining Ganga river basin.

== Conservation status ==
Following the conservation efforts of wildlife activists and involvement of local community, Haiderpur is designated as the 47th Ramsar site, a wetland of international importance in April 2021. The World Wide Fund for Nature and the government have initiated several schemes for the conservation and management of Haiderpur wetland.

== Gallery ==
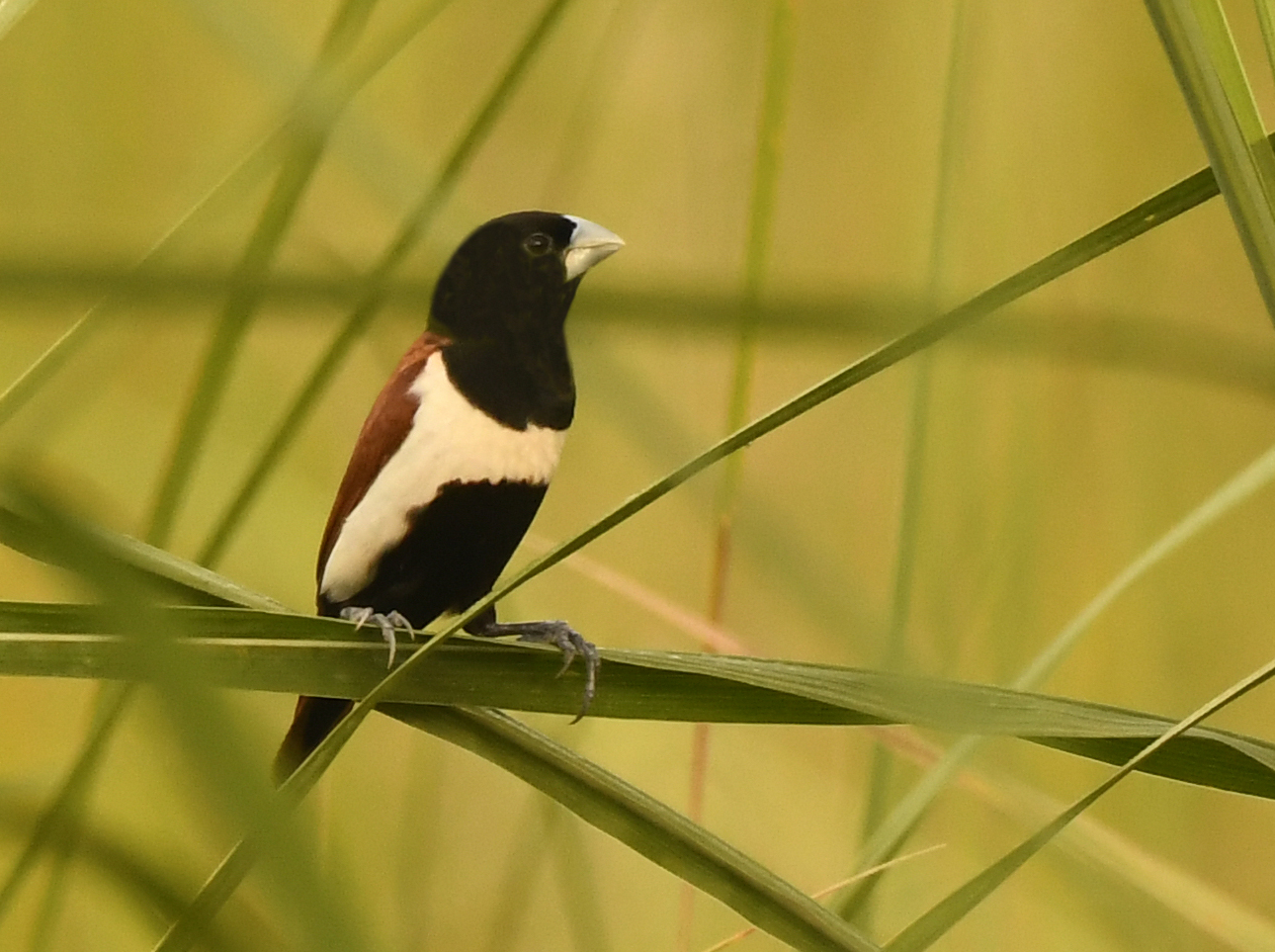
Tricoloured munia - Lonchura malacca

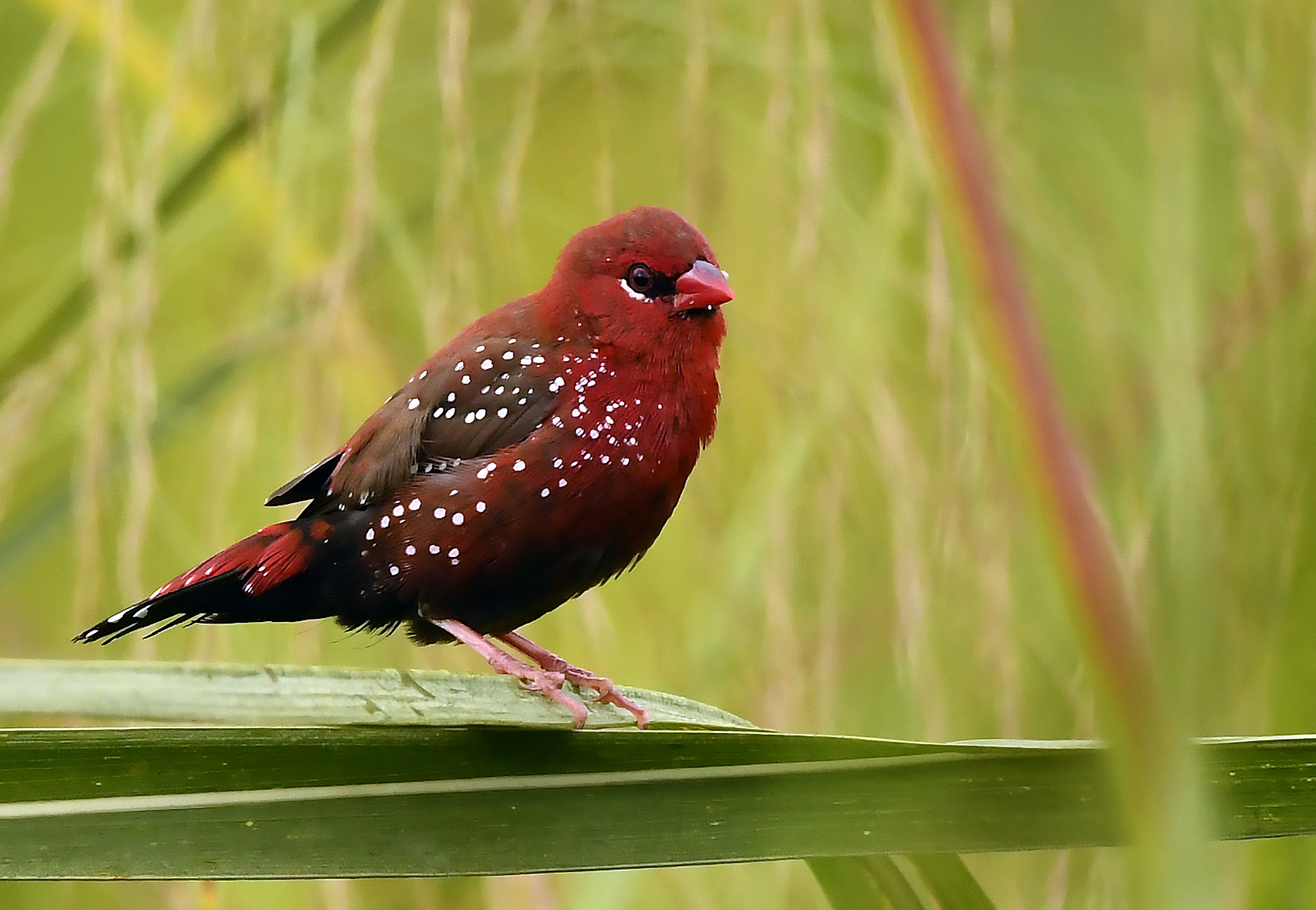
Male Red avadavat in breeding plumage

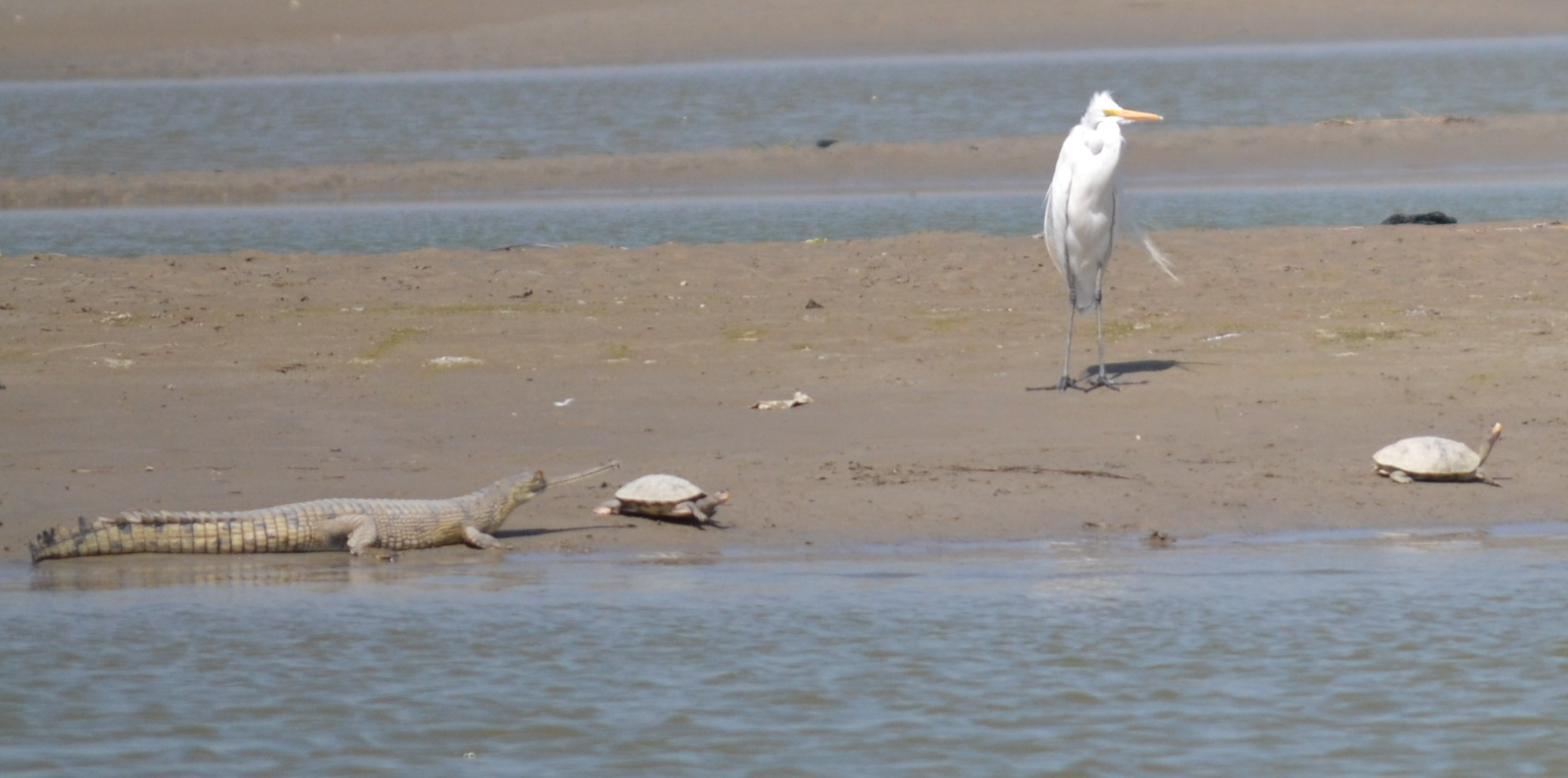
Wetland wildlife at Haiderpur

== See also ==
- Hastinapur Wildlife Sanctuary
- Wildlife sanctuaries of India

== External ==
eBird Hotspot Haiderpur Wetland
