= Nelapattu Bird Sanctuary =

Bird sanctuary in Andhra Pradesh, India

- IUCN category IV (habitat/species management area)
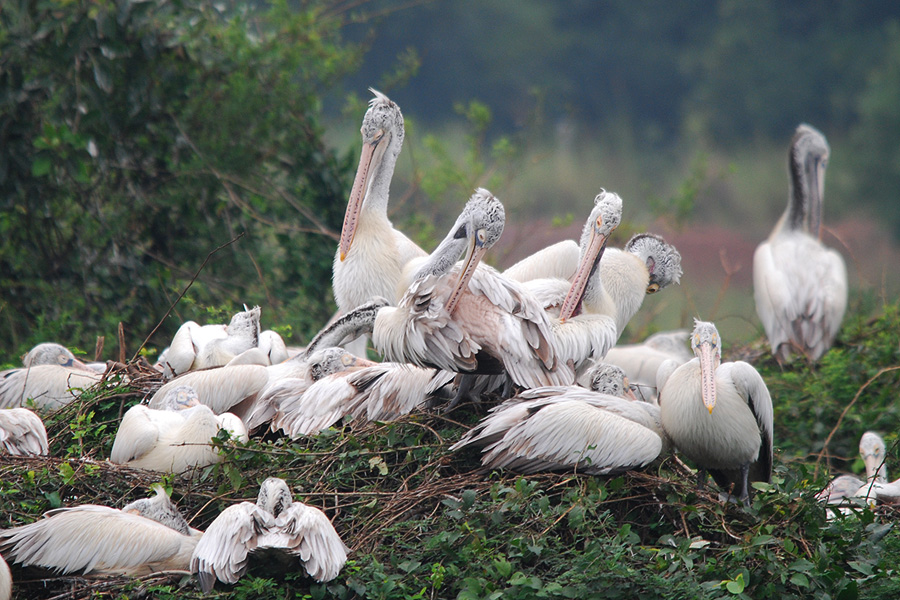
- Spot-billed pelicans (Pelecanus philippensis) at Nelapattu Bird Sanctuary
- Interactive map of Nelapattu Bird Sanctuary
- Location: Tirupati district, Andhra Pradesh, India
- Area: 4.59 km^{2} (1.77 sq mi)
- Established: 1976

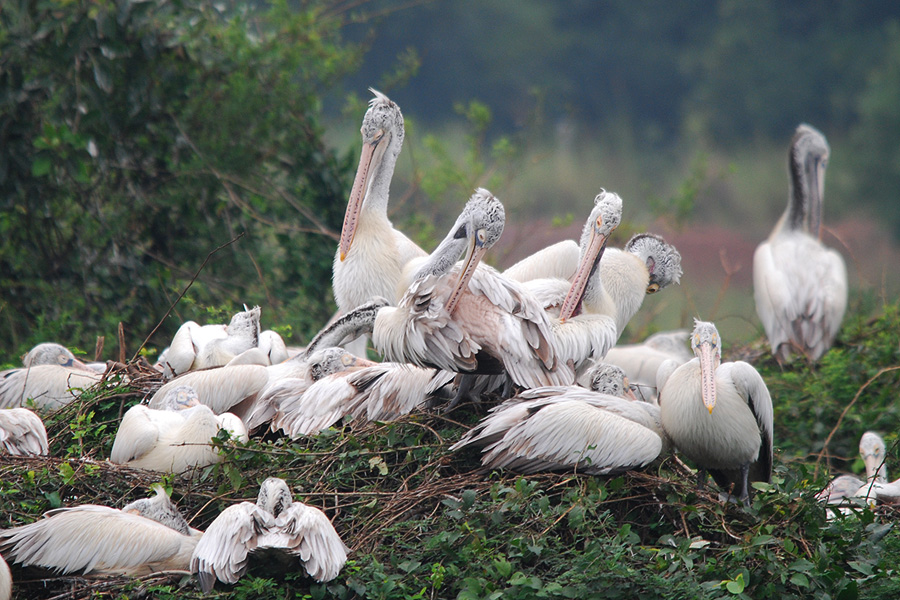
Spot-billed pelicans (Pelecanus philippensis) at Nelapattu Bird Sanctuary

Nelapattu Bird Sanctuary is a bird sanctuary in Tirupati district, Andhra Pradesh, India, near the village of Nelapattu. It has an area of 458.92 hectares. It is an important breeding site for spot-billed pelicans (Pelecanus philippensis).

Nelapattu has two major plant communities, Barringtonia swamp forests and southern dry evergreen scrub.

Southern dry evergreen scrub covers most of the sanctuary, including the 288 hectares of Kalluru Reserved Forest and 88 hectares of unreserved forest. The dominant tree and shrub species are Manilkara hexandra, Maba buxifolia, Memecylon edule, Buchanania angustifolia, Zizyphus xylopyrus, and others.

The Barringtonia swamp forests are found in the 83-ha Nelapattu tank. The predominant tree species is Barringtonia acutangula (Hijal). This tree also grows in uplands, but the tree species found at Nelapattu can grow in flooded conditions lasting for 5 to 7 months. The saplings can survive total submersion during the long duration of flooding.

About 189 bird species can be found at Nelapattu Bird Sanctuary, 50 of which are migratory. In addition to the spot-billed pelican, it is an important breeding site for black-headed ibis, Asian openbill, black-crowned night heron, and little cormorant. Other migratory water birds that visit the sanctuary include northern pintail, common teal, little grebe, northern shoveler, Eurasian coot, Indian spot-billed duck, grey heron, Oriental darter, black-winged stilt, garganey and gadwall.

== See also ==
- Birding in Chennai
- Freshwater swamp forest
- Ratargul Swamp Forest
- Bird sanctuaries of India
