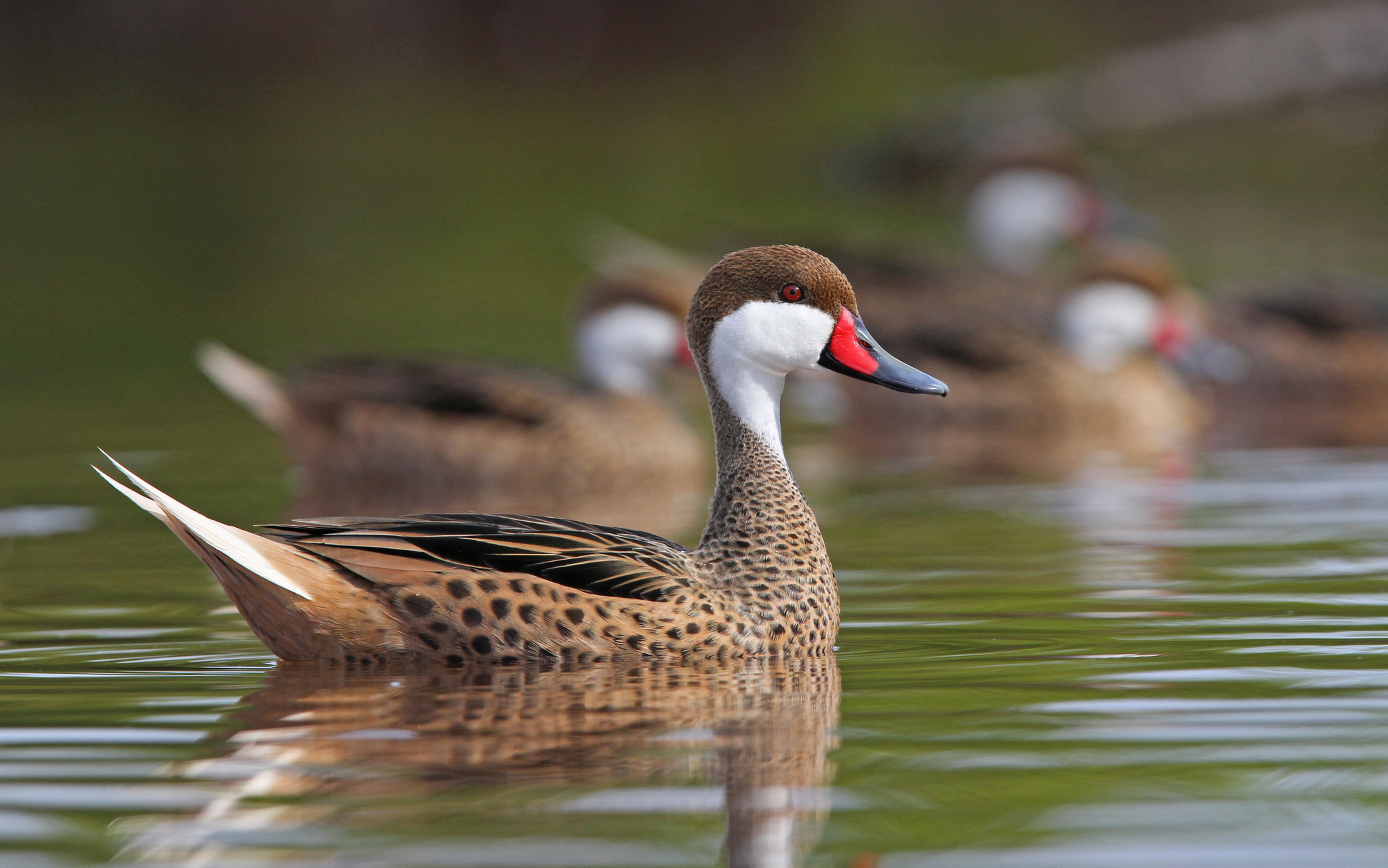
- Anas bahamensis bahamensis, South Abaco, Bahamas

Conservation status
- Least Concern (IUCN 3.1)

Scientific classification
- Kingdom: Animalia
- Phylum: Chordata
- Class: Aves
- Order: Anseriformes
- Family: Anatidae
- Genus: Anas
- Species: A. bahamensis

Binomial name
- Anas bahamensis Linnaeus, 1758

Subspecies
- A. b. bahamensis (Linnaeus, 1758); A. b. galapagensis (Ridgway, 1890); A. b. rubirostris (Vieillot, 1816)

= White-cheeked pintail =

Species of bird

The white-cheeked pintail (Anas bahamensis), also known as the Bahama pintail, Bahama duck, or Galápagos duck is a species of dabbling duck that is patchily distributed throughout South America and the Caribbean. It was first described by Carl Linnaeus in his landmark 1758 10th edition of Systema Naturae under its current scientific name.

== Taxonomy ==
The white-cheeked pintail was formally described in 1758 by the Swedish naturalist Carl Linnaeus in the tenth edition of his Systema Naturae under the current binomial name Anas bahamensis. Linnaeus based his account on the "Ilathera duck" that had been described and illustrated by the English naturalist Mark Catesby in the first volume of his book The Natural History of Carolina, Florida and the Bahama Islands that was published between 1729 and 1732. (Note: Ilathera is an old alternative spelling of Eleuthera, part of The Bahamas.)

Three subspecies are accepted:

- A. b. bahamensis Linnaeus, 1758 – West Indies and north South America
- A. b. rubrirostris Vieillot, 1816 – south Ecuador and south Brazil to north Argentina and north Chile
- A. b. galapagensis (Ridgway, 1890) – Galápagos Islands

The subspecies differ mainly in size, with A. b. bahamensis being smaller (male weight 474–533 g, female 505–633 g) and A. b. rubrirostris larger (male 710 g, female 670 g). A. b. galapagensis is the smallest subspecies, and also has the dullest plumage.

== Description ==
Like many southern ducks, the sexes are similar, though females are slightly smaller and duller in plumage. It is mainly brown with white cheeks and a red-based grey bill; juveniles have duller bill. The wing has an iridescent green speculum. Like the other pintails, it has a slender, acutely pointed tail, though not so marked as in the northern pintail A. acuta. It cannot be confused with any other duck in its range.

== Distribution and habitat ==
It is found in the Caribbean, South America, and the Galápagos Islands. It often occurs on waters with some salinity, such as brackish lakes, estuaries and mangrove swamps, but also on freshwater pools and lakes. It usually occurs in coastal lowlands, but A. b. rubrirostris occurs as high as 2,550 m in Bolivia.

== Behaviour ==
The white-cheeked pintail feeds on aquatic plants (such as Ruppia), grass seeds, algae and small creatures (such as insects and small aquatic invertebrates) obtained by dabbling. The nest is on the ground under vegetation and near water.

== Aviculture ==
It is popular in wildfowl collections, and escapees are occasionally seen in a semi-wild condition in Europe. A leucistic (whitish) breed is known in aviculture as the silver Bahama pintail.

== Gallery ==
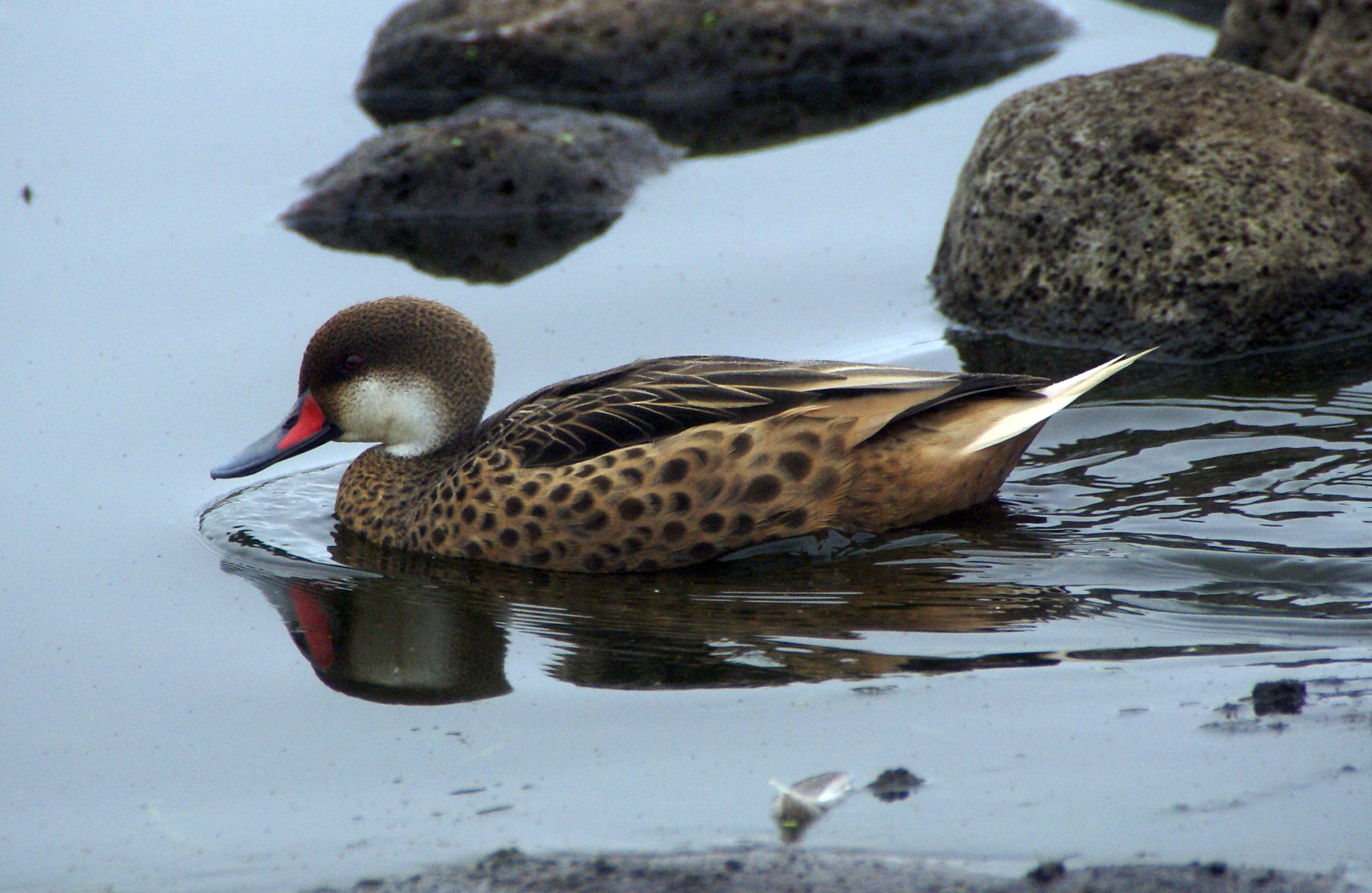
A. b. galapagensis, Santa Cruz, Galápagos Islands

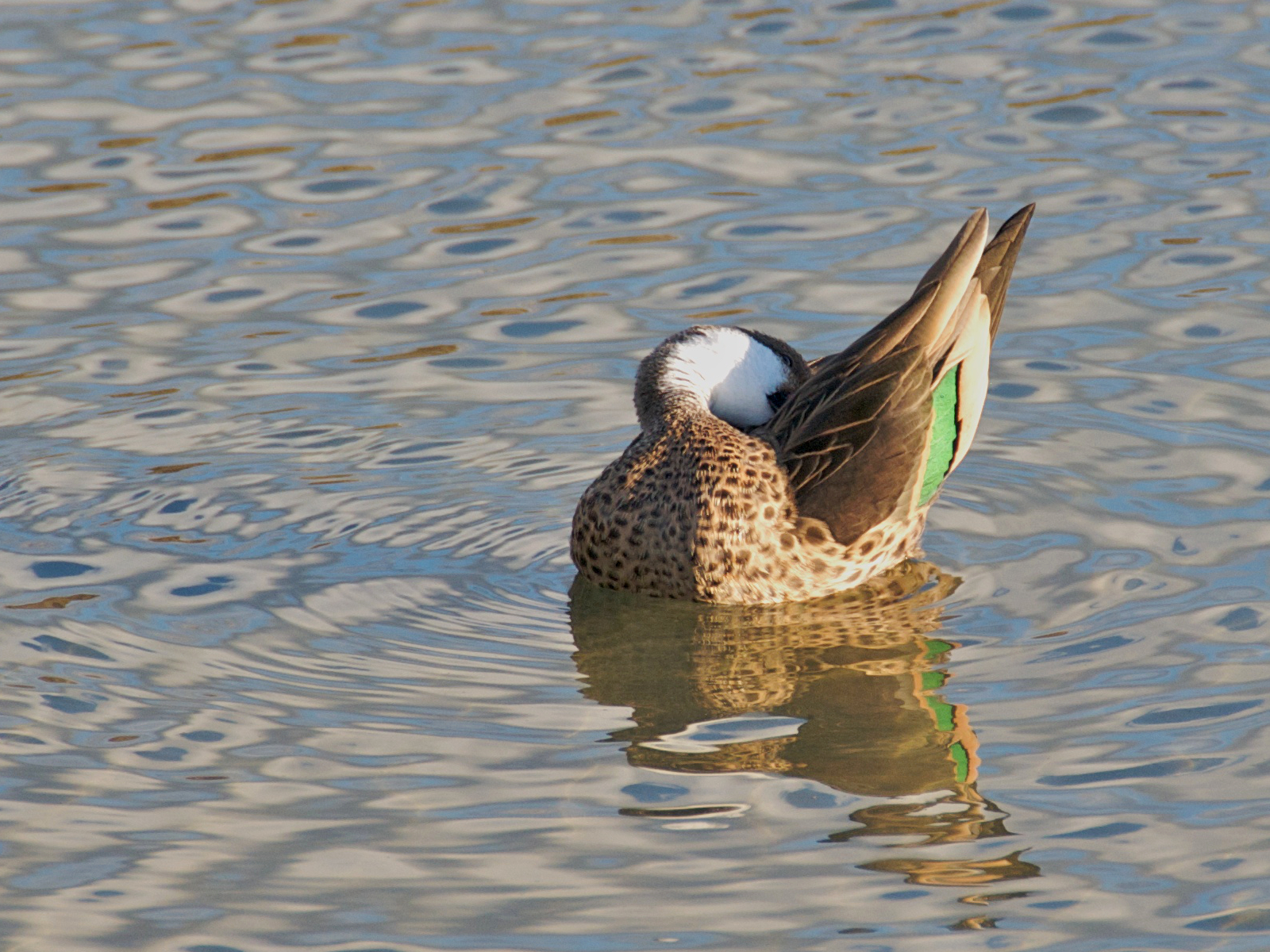
A. b. galapagensis on Baltra, Galápagos, showing the green speculum

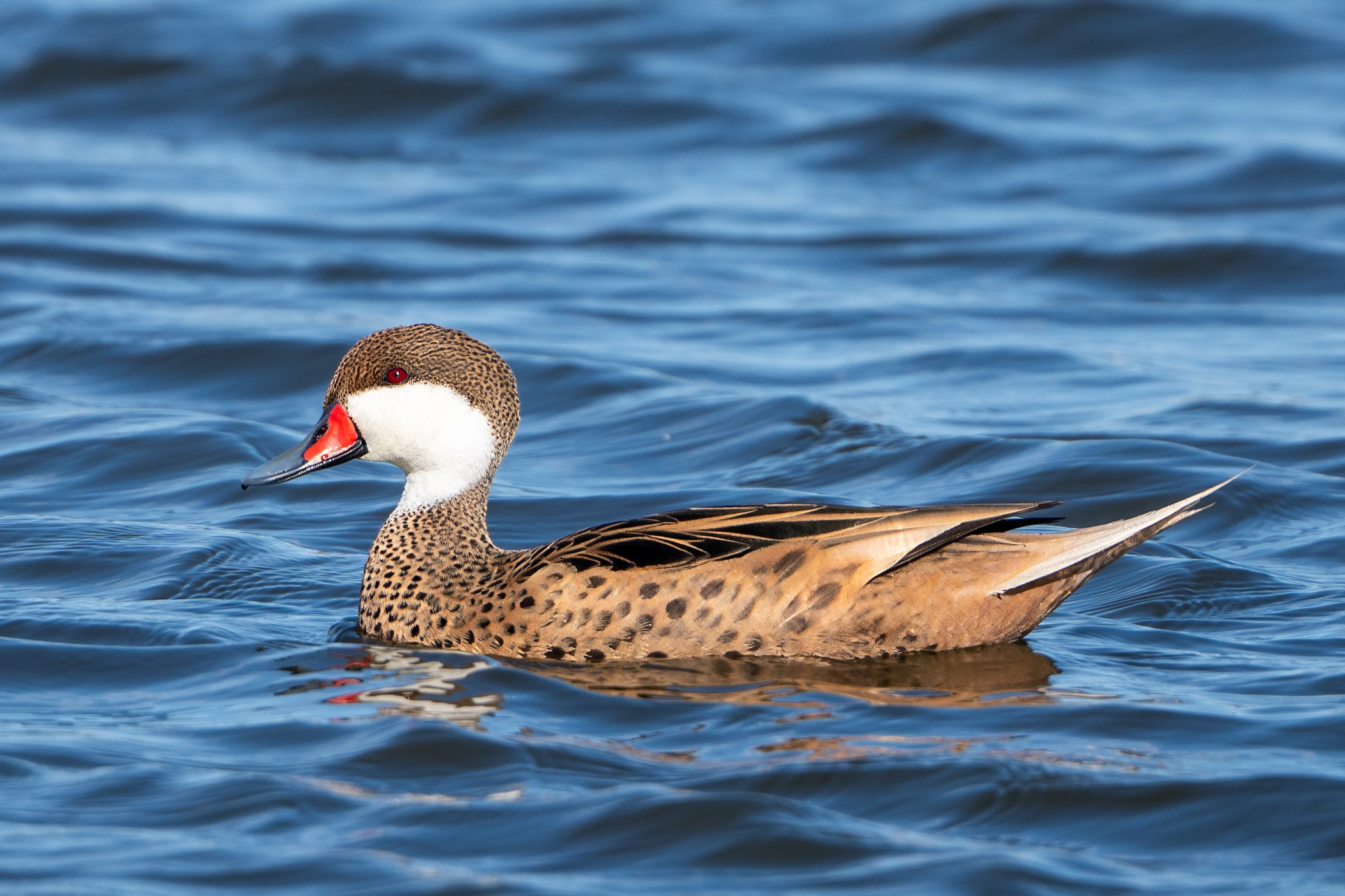
A. b. rubrirostris, Parque Lago, Buenos Aires, Argentina

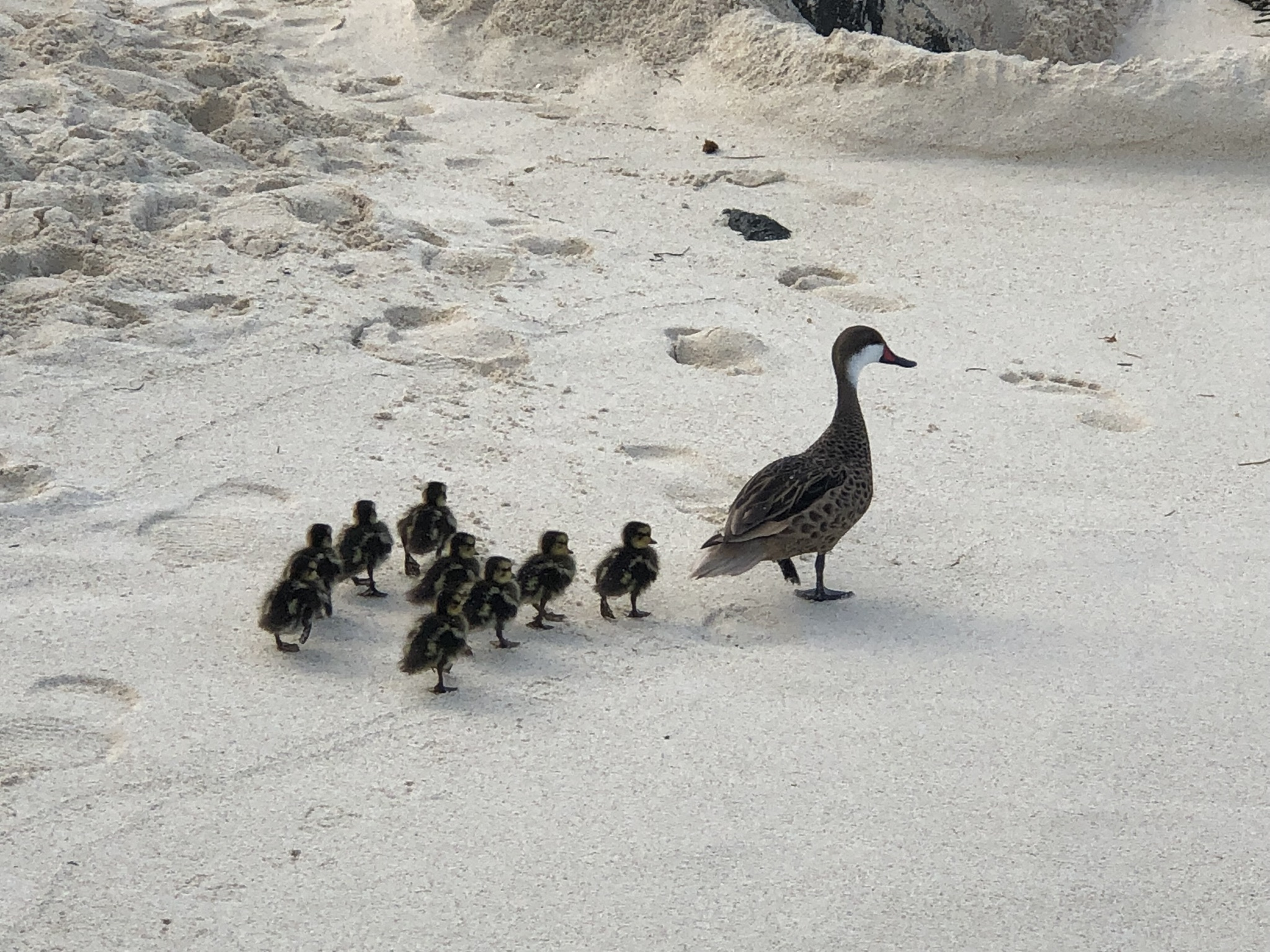
A. b. bahamensis with 9 ducklings, St. Thomas, US Virgin Islands

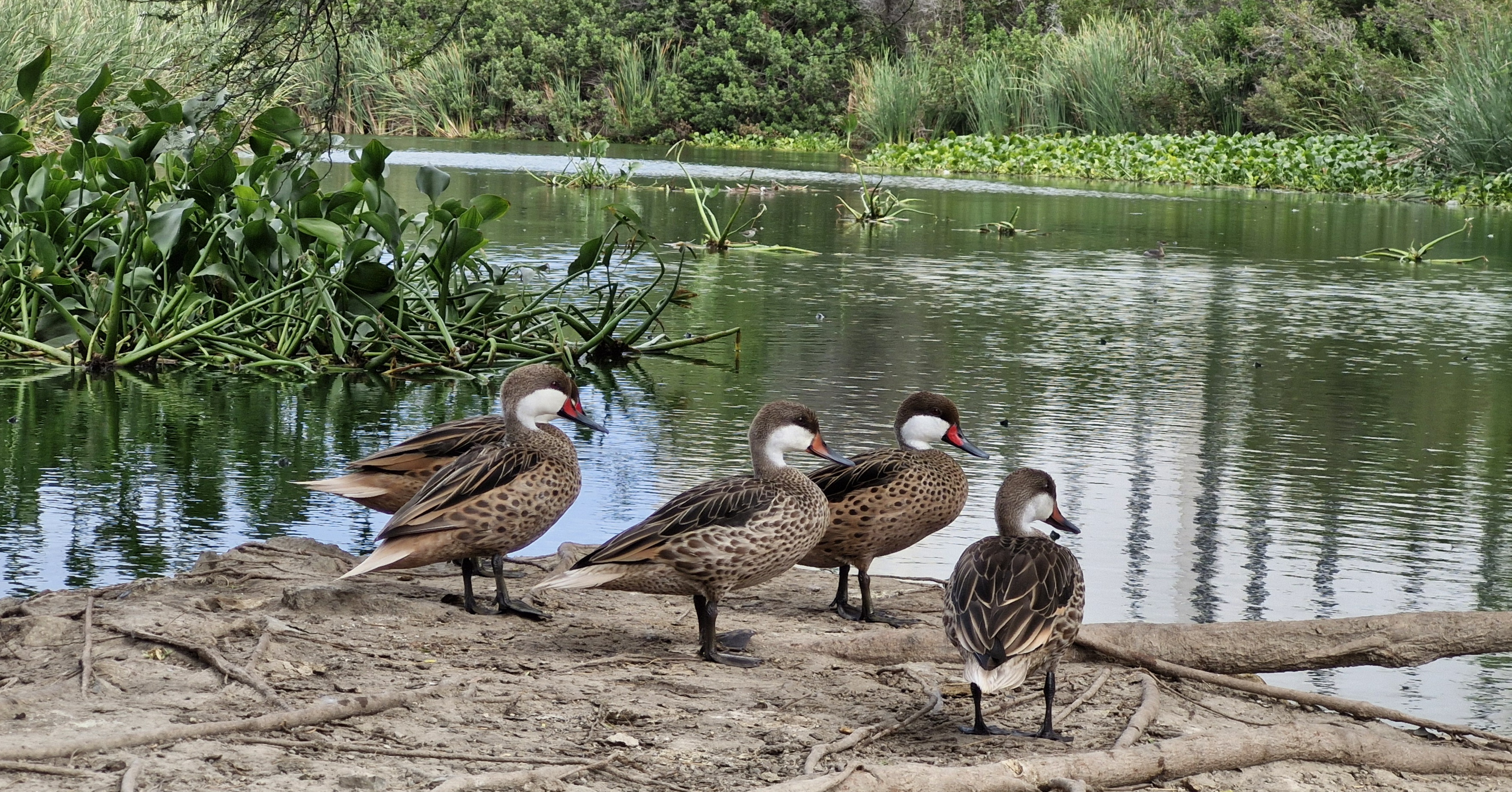
A. b. bahamensis on Aruba

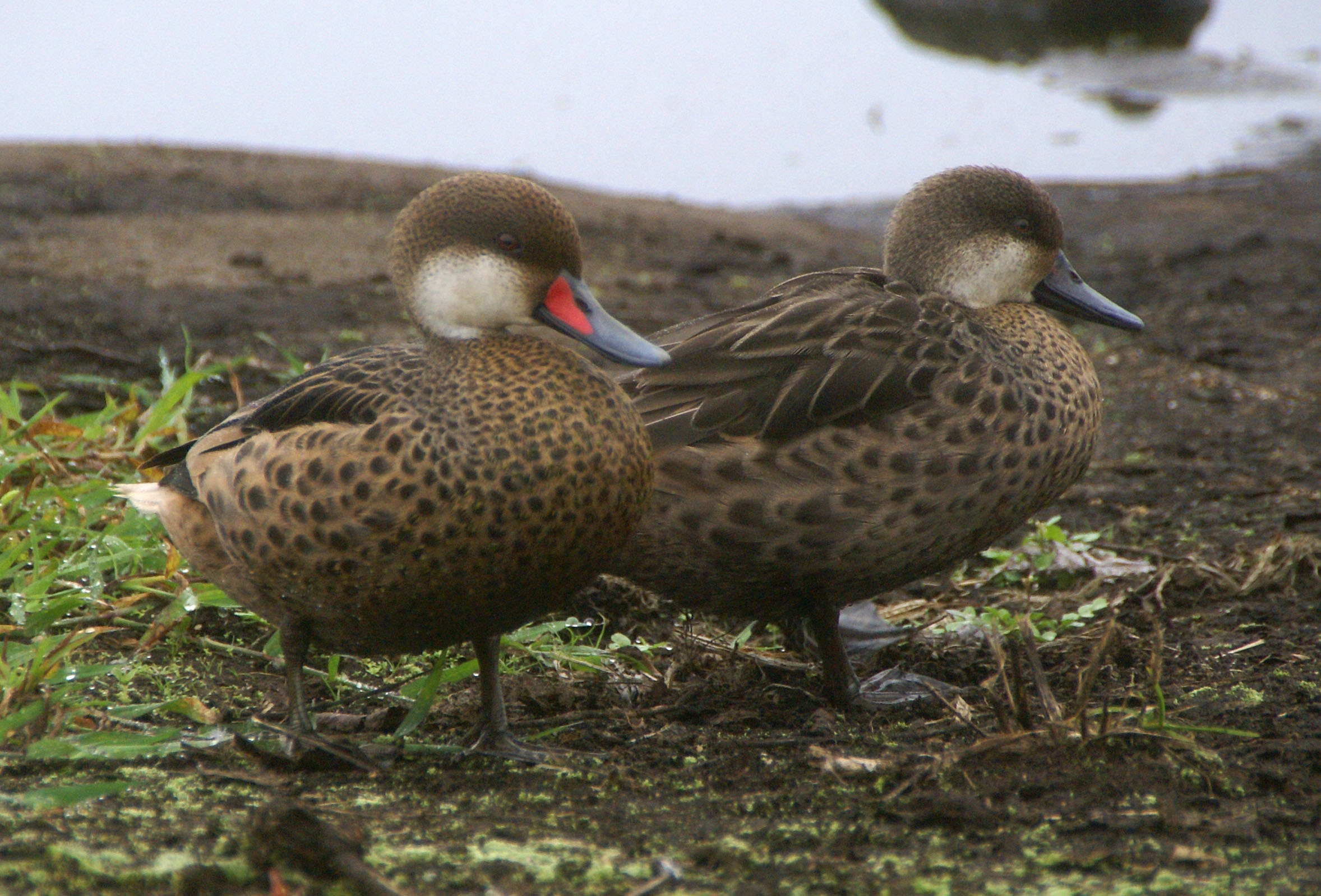
A. b. galapagensis, adult on left with red at the base of its beak and a juvenile with an all black bill on the right

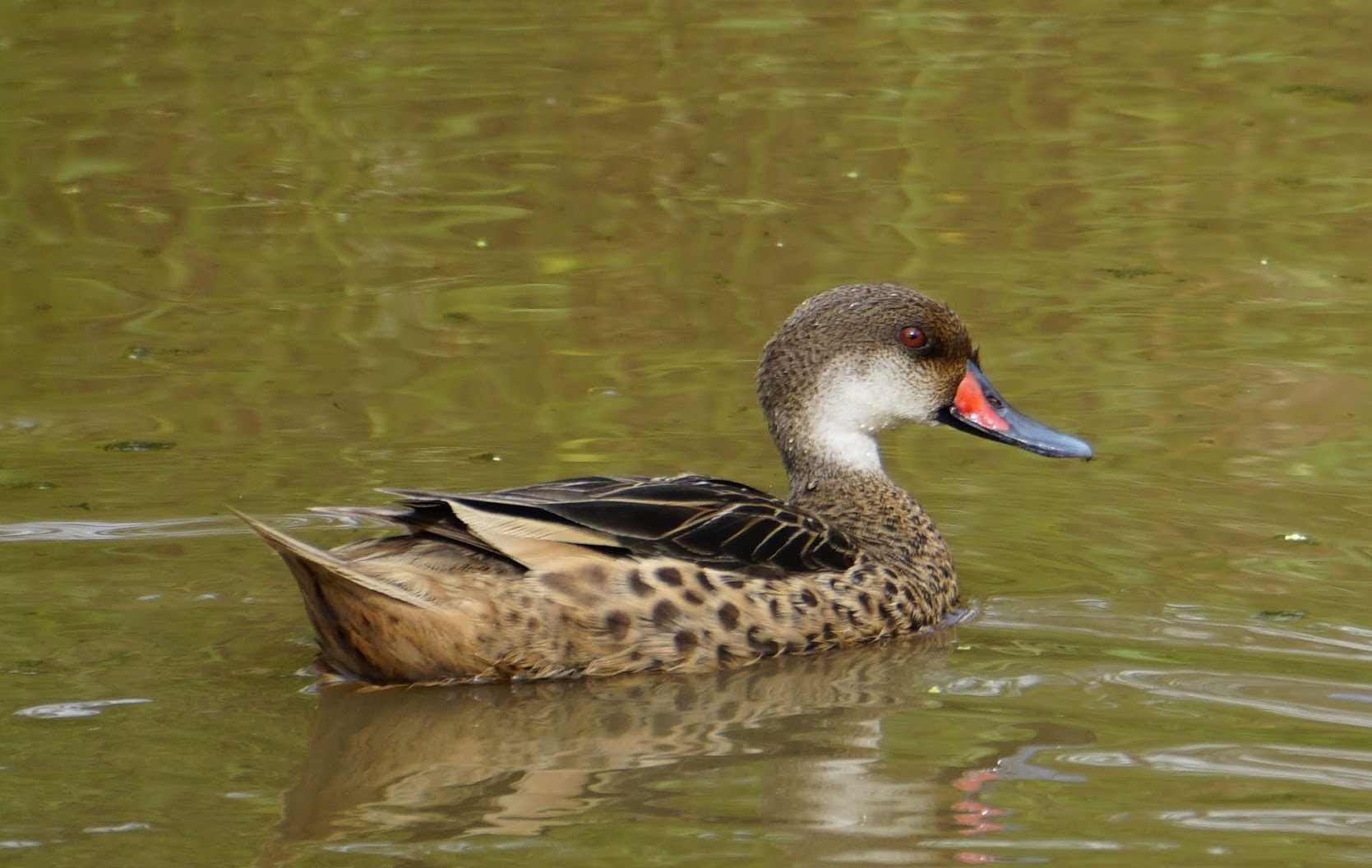
A. b. galapagensis in the Galápagos Islands

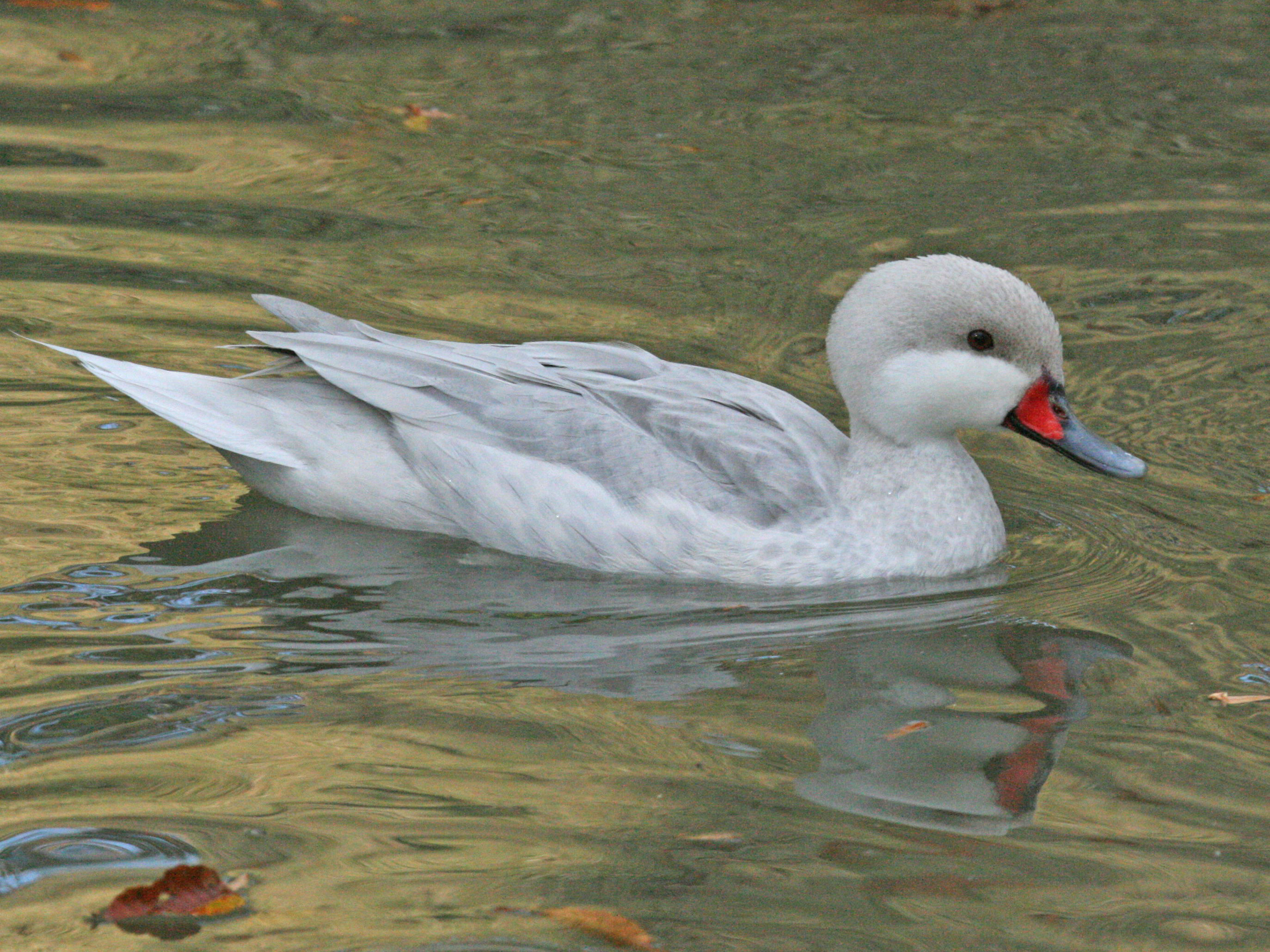
Captive, 'silver' breed
