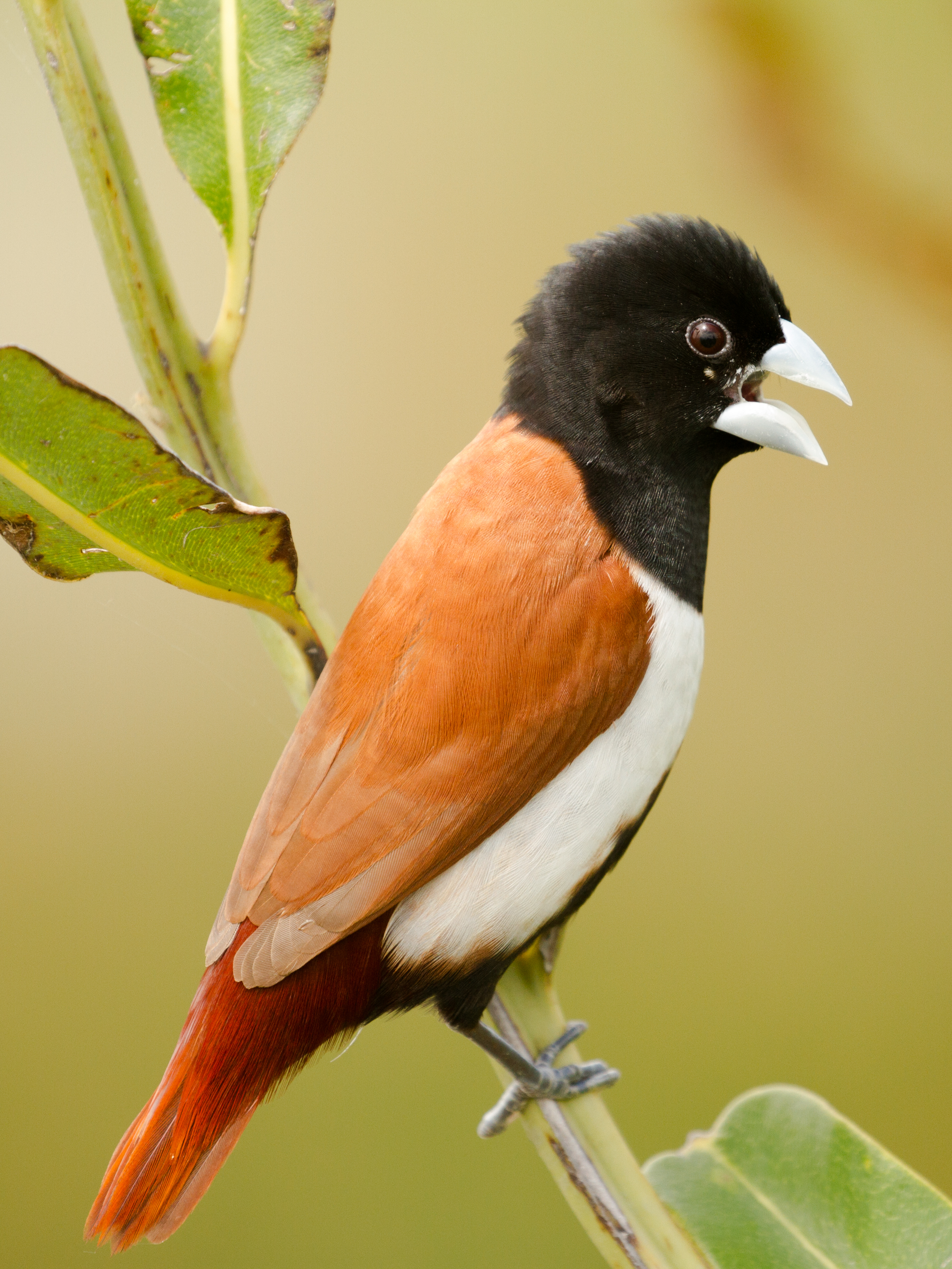

Conservation status
- Least Concern (IUCN 3.1)

Scientific classification
- Kingdom: Animalia
- Phylum: Chordata
- Class: Aves
- Order: Passeriformes
- Family: Estrildidae
- Genus: Lonchura
- Species: L. malacca

Binomial name
- Lonchura malacca (Linnaeus, 1766)

Synonyms
- Loxia malacca Linnaeus, 1766

= Tricoloured munia =

Species of bird

The tricoloured munia (Lonchura malacca) is an estrildid finch, native to Bangladesh, India, Sri Lanka, Pakistan, and southern China. The species has also been introduced to the Caribbean, in Trinidad, Jamaica, Hispaniola, Puerto Rico, Cuba, and Venezuela. This species, like the chestnut munia has been known as the black-headed munia. Immature birds have pale brown upperparts, lack the dark head found in adults, and have uniform buff underparts that can be confused with immatures of other munias such as the scaly-breasted munia.

== Taxonomy ==
The tricolored munia was formally described by the Swedish naturalist Carl Linnaeus in 1766 in the twelfth edition of his Systema Naturae under the binomial name Loxia malacca. Linnaeus mistakenly specified the locality as China, Java and Malacca. This was corrected by E. C. Stuart Baker in 1926 as Belgaum in the state of Karnataka in southwest India. The specific epithet malacca is a geographical misnomer; the species does not occur on the Malay Peninsula. The tricolored munia is now placed in the genus Lonchura that was introduced by the English naturalist William Henry Sykes in 1832. This species was formerly treated as conspecific with the chestnut munia (Lonchura atricapilla). It is monotypic: no subspecies are recognised.

== Measurement ==
These birds are described as medium-sized, measuring 115 mm tall with wings that span 55–57 mm. Their culmen measure 12–13 mm, with males tending to have a more pronounced ridge, and their tarsus is 12–13 mm.

== General coloring ==
Irides in adults are brown and their bills are pale-bluish grey. The legs and feet are grey, as are the scales but those have a darker coloring. In juveniles, the irides are a darker brown and the bill, feet, and legs are described as horn-grey.

The adults are colored black from the head to the throat and breast, and from the belly to undertail coverts and thighs. Between the breast and belly and on its flanks, it's colored white. The upper part of the body is a warm chestnut. Flight feathers are dark brown and the underwing coverts are colored white to cream. The rump is reddish-maroon, as are the uppertail coverts in males; for females, the fringes of the uppertail coverts are paler. For both sexes, there is usually a gold edge on the coverts and on the central tail feathers.

Juveniles are described as "warm brown above, [and] buffish below" and gain adult coloring when they start feeding on their own.

== Courtship ==
Like many birds the Tricolored Munia has a unique mating ritual between males and females. Just as many birds, these birds court with song and dance, however, the courtship first starts with the male flying about with a length of grass in its beak. Then he will perch next to a female, drop the blade of grass, and begin its dance. The male will bob its head up and down and as it becomes more energetic the male will start jumping up the perch. His posture will consist of being upright, with his head down, mouth open and belly feathers standing up. This mating dance is followed up by a mating song which is very quiet to the human ear. If a female accepts the courtship she will lower herself to an almost horizontal position with both tail and head turned towards the male, consenting to coition.

== Breeding ==
Both females and males take part in building the nest. The nest is overall loosely-built and oval in shape with one entrance. Compared to other Munia species the nest is large even for the size of the female and male. Some of the grass blades and stems stick out of the entrance creating a sort of porch. Most nests are built away from human habitation on reeds and or grass swamps, about three feet over water.

The clutch usually consists of 4 to 5 eggs but in India it is usual for the clutches to consist of 7 eggs. The eggs are oval in shape and white in color and the average size of the eggs is 16.3 x 11.5mm. The incubation period for the eggs is about 12 to 13 days. Both males and females take part in incubation and take turns incubating and at night both birds are in the nest. The offspring are brooded for about 8 to 10 days and they develop feathers in about three weeks.

== Habitat ==
The tricoloured munia is a small gregarious bird which feeds mainly on grain and other seeds. It inhabits wet grassland habitats. It may also be found in tropical lowland moist forest habitats.

== Invasive history ==
The Tri-colored Munia has been introduced to parts of Europe, South America, North America, and Oceania accidentally or with purpose. In cases of the latter, it is due to its status as an ornamental species, though it is unknown when they were brought to those countries. But in the 1940s, they were imported to Venezuela because, according to Dr. Fernandez, birdkeepers wanted to breed them with local finches. The birdkeepers were interested in their song, but then the Munia were released into the wild when it was discovered that they could not sing.

While the Munia were being imported to Venezuela, the father of Dr. Fernandez, who goes by the same name, believed that they would become established and pests if they were continuously released by birdkeepers who did not want them. The survival rate of maturing Munias in Venezuela became close to those of the local bird species, allowing there to be a "population explosion" in the coming decade.

Initially, the Munias struggled to survive during the dry seasons in the reedbeds and marshes at the edges of Lago de Valencia, Venezuela due to drought conditions. The lake shrunk, acting as a water source for a city, and rice fields in the south could not provide much relief, being a seasonal crop. However, Spiza americana's repeated migration to the rice field caused an irrigation system to be implemented and the field to be tended to outside its season. As Robin Restall had described, "[the Tricolored Munia] found a munia paradise - ideal food and ideal breeding conditions - all year round."

Tri-colored Munia has become a very prevalent and successful invasive species due to the environment being a suitable habitat. This species likes to inhabit warm environments that are both near pools of water and grain or rice fields. A study done by Raul E. Sedano-Cruz, a researcher affiliated with the Hospital Universitario del Valle, showed the birds' speciality in rice fields, as they failed to colonize the Centro Internacional de Agricultural (CIAT) because of the severe reduction in rice fields.

Axel Fuentes-Moreno, holding a Bachelor of Science in the Colegio de Postgraduados, believes that one of the major characteristics that has favored the tricolored munia to become highly invasive is its reproductive strategy. For example, tricolored munia for the most part have two clutches of eggs per year consisting of four to seven eggs. Meanwhile, its competitors, like the semilleros from the American tropics, only have one clutch of eggs per year consisting of two to three eggs. Not only that but the tricolored munia also prefers to build these nests over vegetation that is surrounded by water, decreasing predation by snakes or mammals. As well, it was observed that post-fledgling Munias have a survival rate that is as high as the local bird species, in part to its behavior against tropic predators.

The Tri-colored Munia's invasive status has changed in some countries where it was introduced. In Robin Restall's 1997 book Munias and Mannikins, the Tricolored-Munia was described as a breeding resident in Hong Kong's Mai Po marshes, but it was observed that there seemed to be a decline in the population. Restall also mentioned Pratt et al.'s research in 1987, where the latter did not mention the Munia on Oahu, Hawaii even though it was established. Later, in a 2003 magazine article written by Restall, the Munia was said to be classified as exotic and feral in Venezuela, although they were also established and sold as pets under the advertisement of being "locally-caught". In general, its preference for grains has made it a pest for rice farmers. In Mexico, according to a 2011 article by Olguín-Hernández et al., it was listed as an exotic bird and the effects of exotic birds were described as transmitting disease and parasites, producing offspring with other birds, and competing for food and habitat in the area.

== Gallery ==
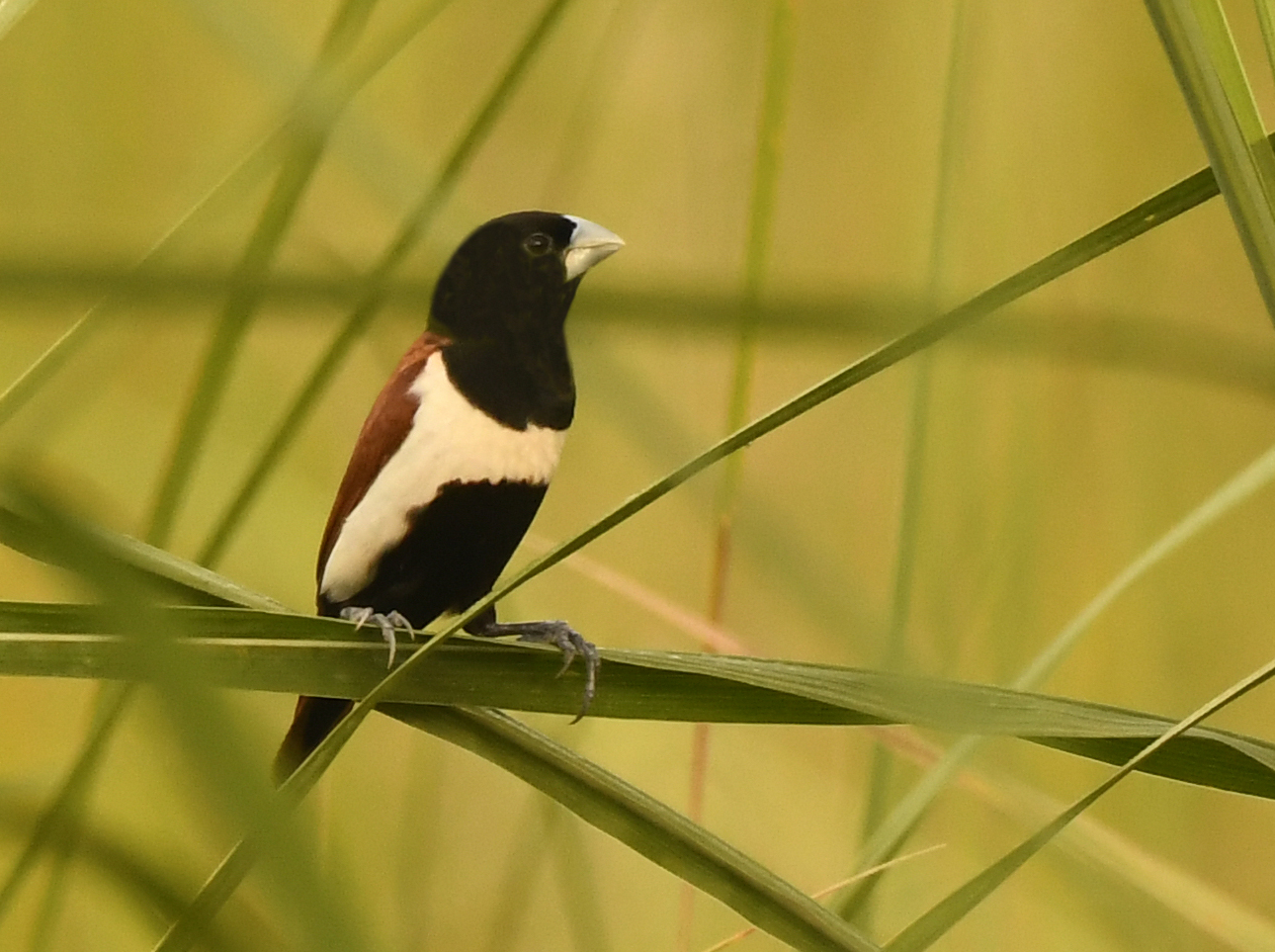
Tricoloured Munia - Lonchura malacca malacca at Haiderpur Wetland
