= Pintail =

Pintail may refer to:

== Animals ==
=== Dabbling ducks ===
- Northern pintail (Anas acuta), sometimes called the pintail, the most common pintail species
- White-cheeked pintail (Anas bahamensis), from the Caribbean, South America and the Galápagos
- Yellow-billed pintail (Anas georgica), found from southern Colombia to South Georgia
- South Georgia pintail (Anas georgica georgica), the nominate race of the yellow-billed pintail
- Eaton's pintail (Anas eatoni), from the islands of Kerguelen and Crozet

=== Other animals ===
- Pin-tailed snipe (Gallinago stenura), a small stocky wader
- Acisoma, a genus of dragonflies

== Other uses ==
- Fairey Pintail, a British single-engined floatplane fighter
- Haynes Pintail canard-configuration ultralight aircraft
- Pintail Island, Nunavut, Canada
- Pin-tailed longboards, a type of skateboard
- USS Pintail (AMc-17), a U.S. Navy minesweeper
- Pintail Duck, a Disney character in the Duck family

== See also ==
- Pin the tail on the donkey, traditional children's game
