= Hastinapur Wildlife Sanctuary =

Protected area in Uttar Pradesh, India

- IUCN category IV (habitat/species management area)
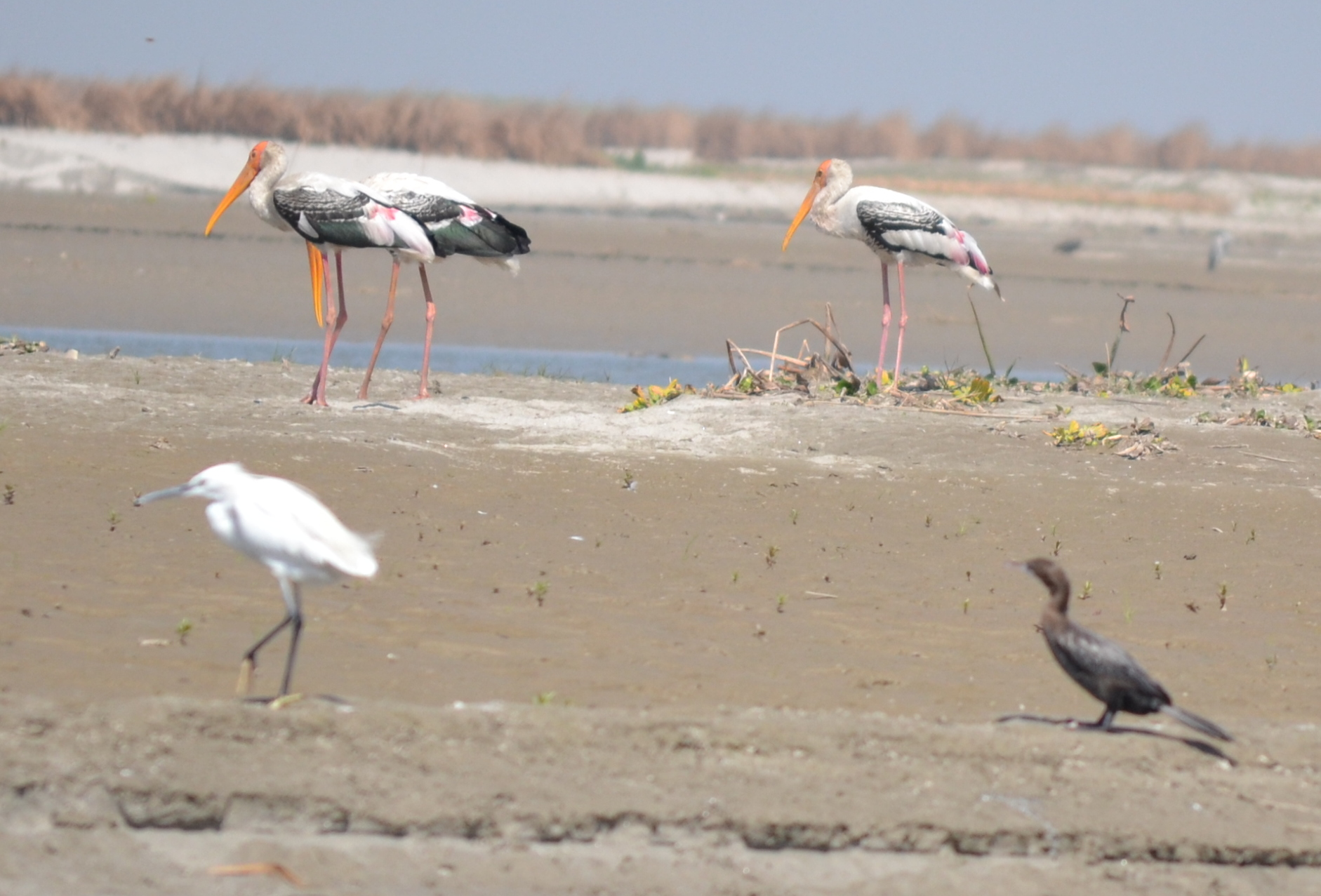

- Location within Uttar Pradesh Location within India
- Interactive map of Hastinapur Wildlife Sanctuary
- Location: Uttar Pradesh, India
- Nearest city: Meerut (35 km) & Delhi (96 km)
- Coordinates: 29°10′N 78°06′E
- Area: 2,073 km^{2} (800 sq mi)
- Established: 1986

Hastinapur Wildlife Sanctuary is a protected area in the Gangetic plains of Uttar Pradesh, India. It was established in 1986 and covers 2,073 km^{2} (800 sq mi) in Meerut, Muzzafarnagar, Ghaziabad, Bijnor, Hapur and Amroha districts.

== Geography ==
Hastinapur Wildlife Sanctuary lies on the bank of the Ganges river at an elevation of 130–150 m (430–490 ft) in Bijnor, Muzaffarnagar, Meerut, Amroha and Hapur districts of Uttar Pradesh; its total size of 2,073 km^{2} (800 sq mi) includes about 767 km^{2} (296 sq mi) of riverscape, wetlands and riparian grasslands. Tall grasslands dominate in low-lying areas and are inundated most of the year. Short grasslands are dry from winter to the onset of the monsoon. Dry scrub grasslands dominate on elevated alluvial deposition. Swamps and marshes are present between elevated grounds and the sandy bed of the Ganges. A large part of the sanctuary is settled and under cultivation. Sugarcane, rice, wheat, maize and cucurbits are the major cultivated crops.

=== Climate ===
The temperature in Hastinapur Wildlife Sanctuary varies from 9 to 29 °C (48 to 84 °F) during the winter season. Summer temperatures range from 41 to 26 °C (106 to 79 °F). It receives an annual rainfall of 102 cm (40 in).

== Wildlife ==
Between 2009 and 2012, 494 gharials were released in Hastinapur Wildlife Sanctuary. It harbours Ganges river dolphin, swamp deer, smooth-coated otter, Indian leopard, chital, sambar deer and nilgai.

Among the 117 bird species recorded are short-toed snake eagle, Egyptian vulture white-eyed buzzard, black-shouldered kite, black kite, shikra, Western marsh harrier, spotted owlet, Indian grey hornbill, painted stork, Asian open-billed stork, white-necked stork, black ibis, Indian peafowl, Sarus crane, Demoiselle crane, Eurasian spoonbill, purple heron, pond heron, black-crowned night heron, cattle egret, large egret, median egret, little egret, little grebe, bar-headed goose, lesser whistling duck, comb duck, cotton teal, gadwall, mallard, Indian spot-billed duck, Northern shoveller, ruddy shelduck, Northern pintail, garganey, common pochard, grey francolin, purple moorhen, common moorhen, white-breasted waterhen, common coot, black-winged stilt curlew sandpiper, pied avocet, pheasant-tailed jacana, bronze-winged jacana, rose-ringed parakeet, Indian roller, pied kingfisher, white-breasted kingfisher, Asian green bee-eater, blue-tailed bee-eater, coppersmith barbet, hoopoe, rufous-backed shrike, red-vented bulbul, small pratincole.
