= Mandagadde Bird Sanctuary =

Mandagadde Bird Sanctuary ಮಂಡಗದ್ದೆ ಪಕ್ಷಿಧಾಮ
- Village
- Location within Karnataka
- Coordinates: 13°44′26″N 75°27′37″E
- Country: India
- State: Karnataka
- District: Shimoga district
- Taluk: Tirthahalli

Area
  - Total: 0.0046 km^{2} (0.0018 sq mi)

Languages
  - Official: Kannada
- Time zone: UTC+5:30 (IST)

Mandagadde Bird Sanctuary is an island located near the Mandagadde village which is 30 km from the Shimoga town in Shimoga district in the Indian state of Karnataka. The island spans an area of 1.14 acres and it is surrounded by forest and a river named Tunga. This spot is very much adjacent to the N.H. between Shimoga to Thirthalli and easily reachable.Being an island surrounded by perennial river Tunga, this spot is visited by migrant birds for breeding.

== About ==
Mandagadde is one of the 20 important sanctuaries in the country and attracts birds in large numbers between July and September. Several species of birds lay eggs on the island in sanctuary during July to September, with peak season of August. The birds prefer the top branches of the trees for nesting as the island is partially submerged by the swollen river Tunga during monsoon.

This sanctuary is important for bird nesting with over 5,000 birds here during the peak season. The quaint little island is also graced by the presence of various other varieties, such as the Maiden Egret, Pied Kingfisher, Wooly Neck Stalk, Night Herons, Open-billed storks etc. A watchtower has been put up for viewing different species of birds. Boating can be taken for closer viewing of the nesting birds.

== Birds ==
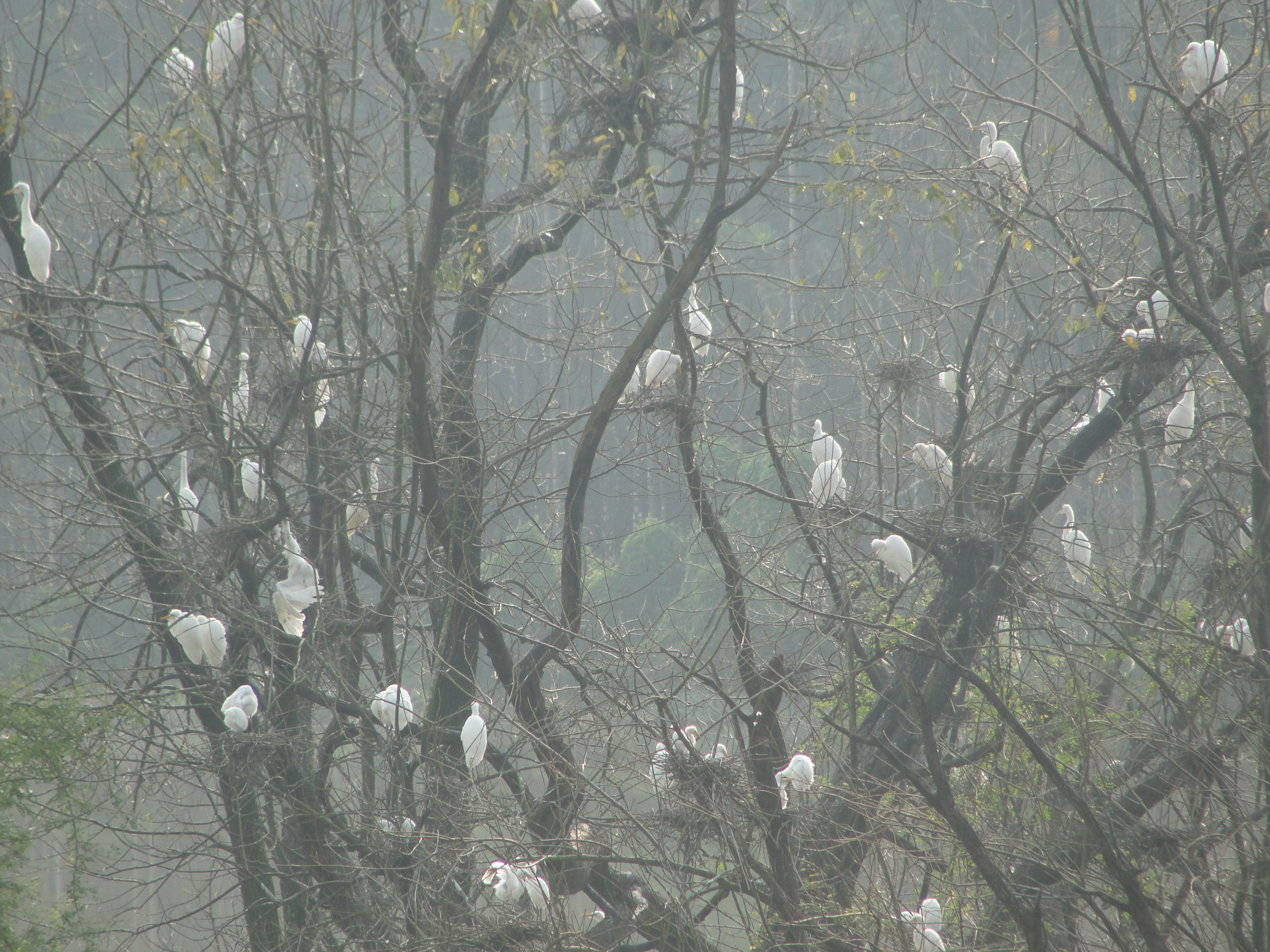
Water birds, Mandagadde Island, Shimoga, India

During season, three types of migratory birds flock to the lush green environs of the sanctuary and stay till December which are:

- Median egret
- Darter (or snake bird)
- Little cormorant

During the peak season in August, it is estimated that more than 5,000 birds visit the sanctuary.

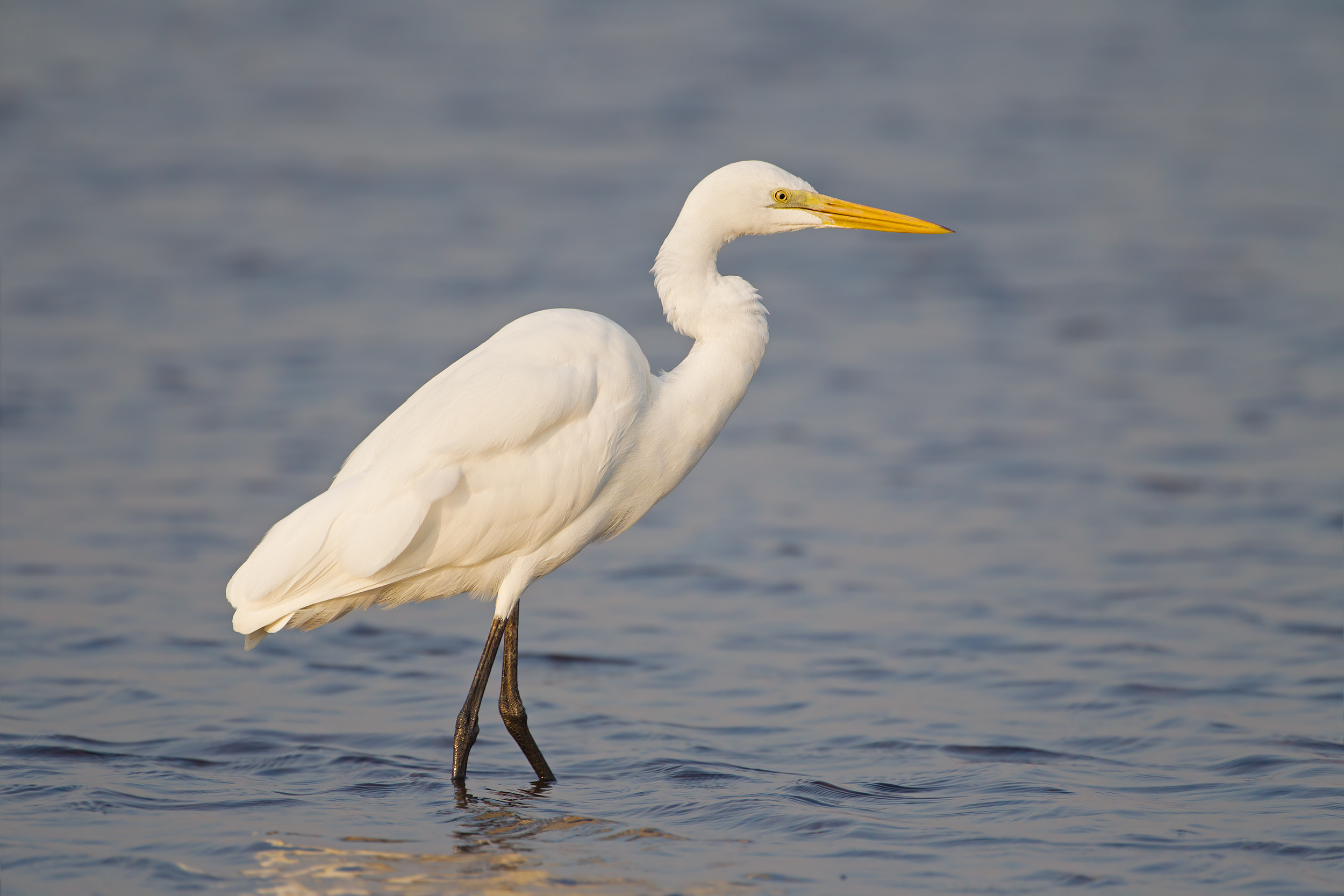
The great egret

Mandagadde is 30 km from Shimoga, 140 km from Mangalore and 345 km from Bangalore.
