= Porbandar Bird Sanctuary =

Coordinates: 21.635°N 69.619°E

- IUCN category IV (habitat/species management area)
- Interactive map of Porbandar Bird Sanctuary
- Location: Porbandar district, Gujarat, India
- Area: 0.09 km^{2} (0.035 sq mi)
- Established: 1988

Porbandar Bird Sanctuary is a bird sanctuary in the Porbandar District of Gujarat state, India, which was dedicated in 1988.

It is the only bird sanctuary in Gujarat that provides legal protection to the birds which nest there. It is small, only covering 9.33 hectares (0.0933 km^{2}). The sanctuary has a lake attracting migratory birds and other birds such as teals, fowls, flamingos, ibis and curlews.

== History ==
The area was dedicated as a sanctuary in 1988 by the governance of the Porbandar District. In 1990 the sanctuary came under the oversight of the Gujarat Forest Department.

== See also ==
- Arid Forest Research Institute
