= Pintail Island =

Island in Nunavut, Canada

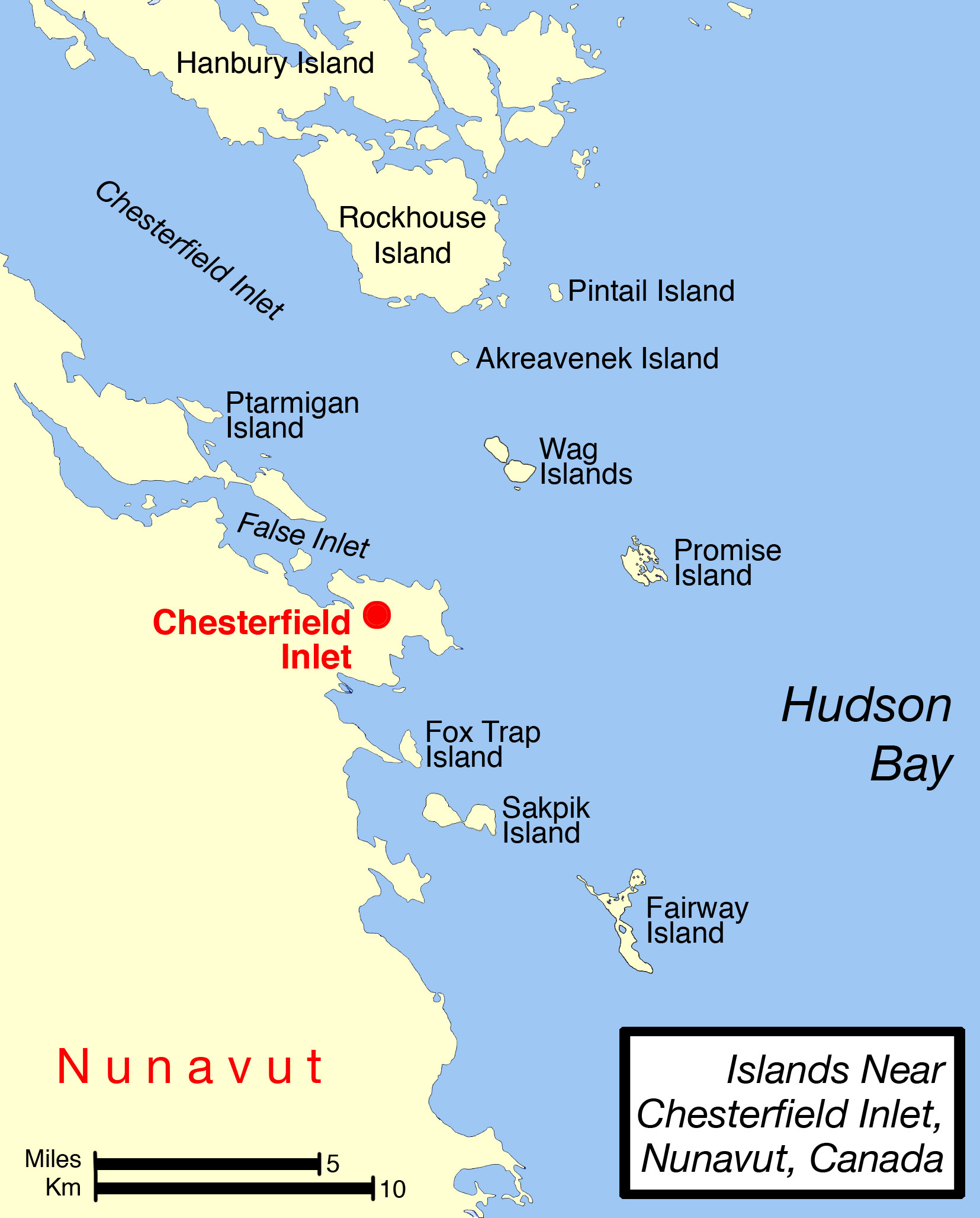
- Pintail Island at the mouth of Chesterfield Inlet.

- Location within Nunavut Location within Canada

Geography
- Location: Chesterfield Inlet
- Coordinates: 63°26′56″N 90°35′24″W
- Archipelago: Arctic Archipelago

Administration
- Canada
- Nunavut: Nunavut
- Region: Kivalliq

Demographics
- Population: Uninhabited

Pintail Island is one of the uninhabited Canadian arctic islands in Nunavut, Canada. It is located at the mouth of Chesterfield Inlet.

The island is approximately 14.4 km (8.9 mi) from the Inuit hamlet of Chesterfield Inlet.
