= Natural vegetation and wildlife of Andhra Pradesh =

The state of Andhra Pradesh is considered one of the rich 123 bio-diversified states in India. Natural vegetation (flora) and animal life (fauna) depend mainly on climate, relief, and soil. Krishna and Godavari are the two largest rivers flowing through the state. The Andhra Pradesh Forest Department deals with protection, conservation and management of forests.

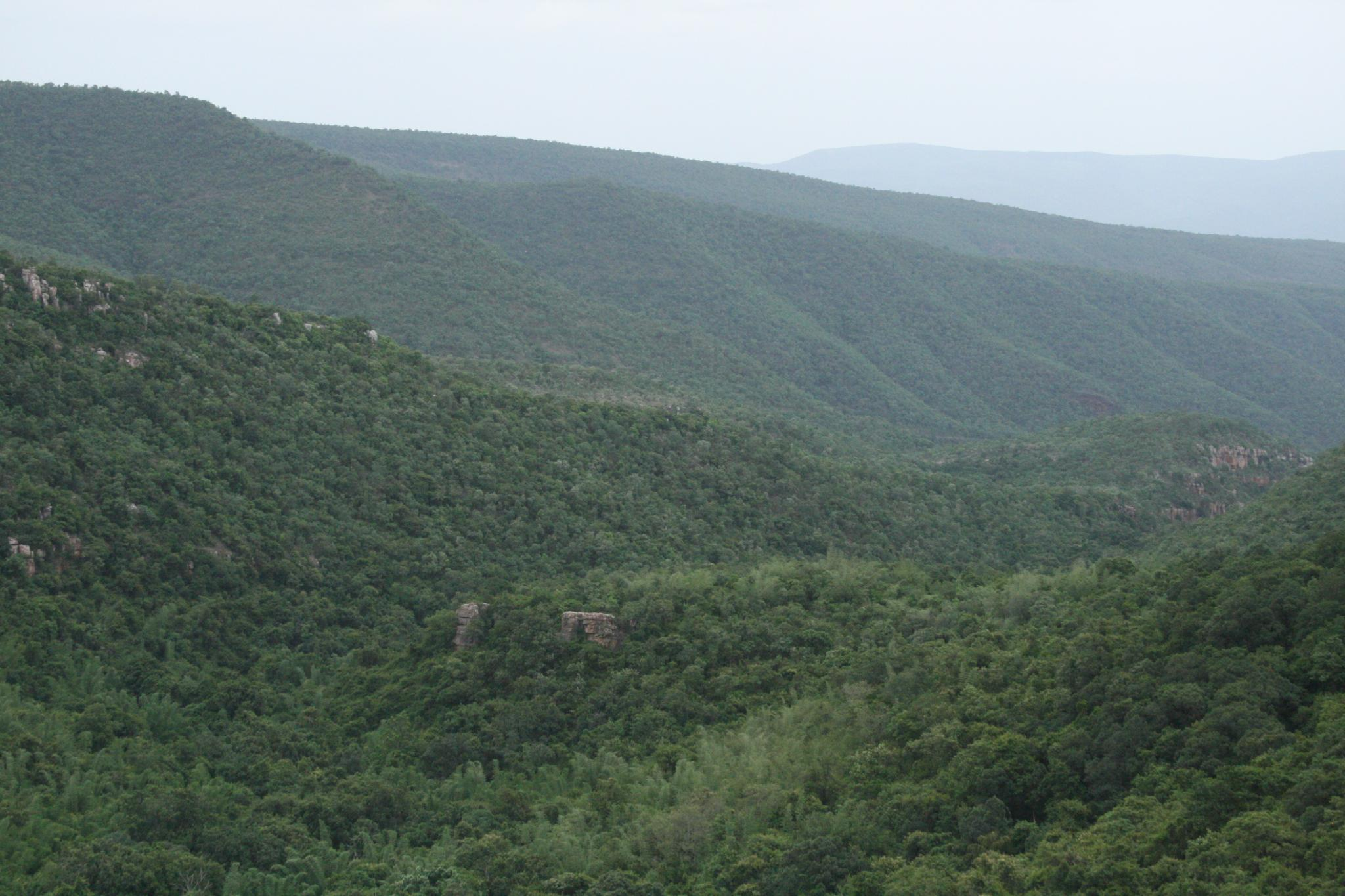
Sri Venkateswara National Park Tirumala Hills

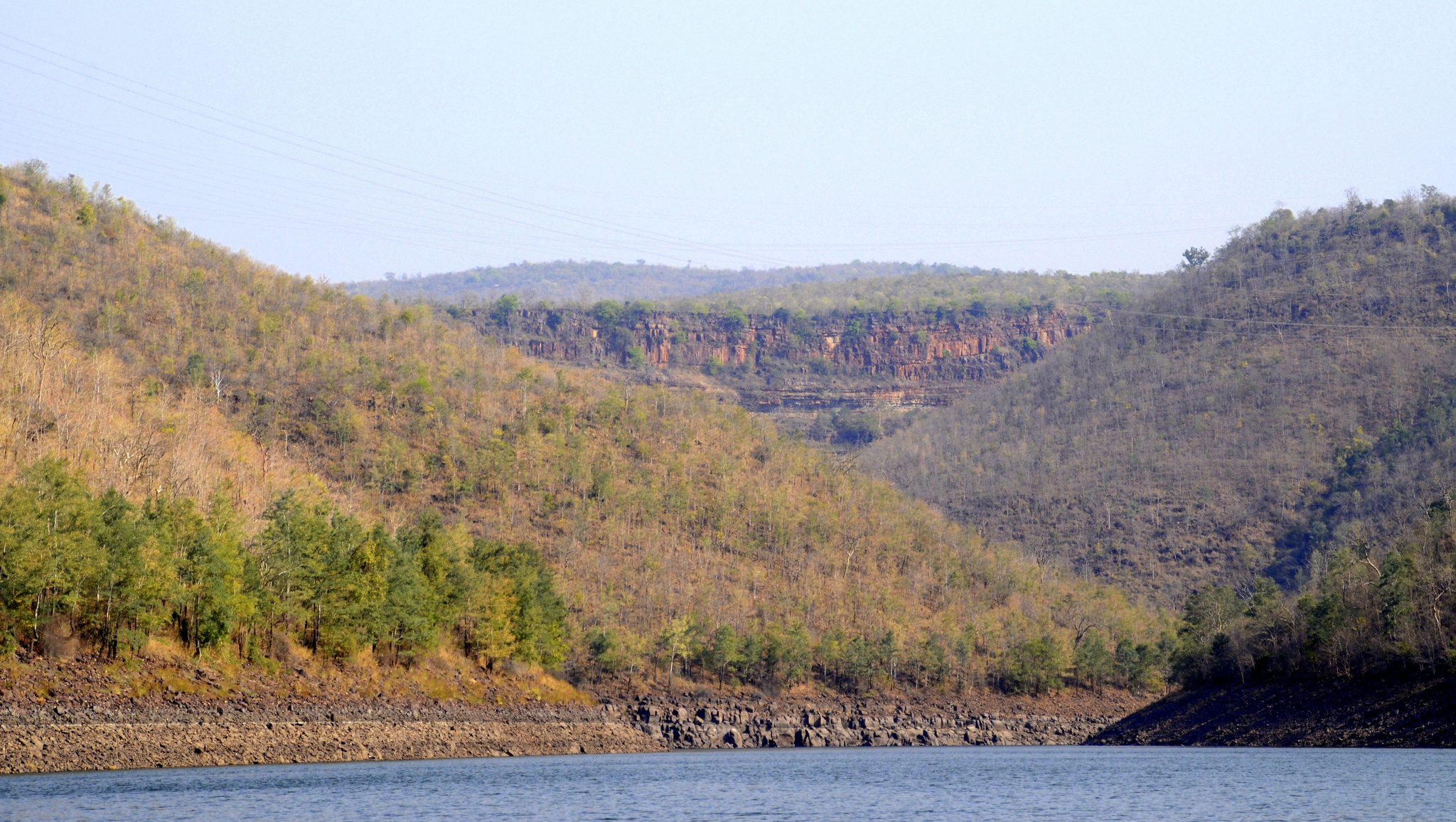
Nallamala Hills near Srisailam

== Natural vegetation ==
The total forest cover of Andhra Pradesh is 37,258 km^{2}. The Eastern Ghats region is home to dense tropical forests, while the vegetation becomes sparse as the Ghats give way to the Deccan Plateau, where shrub vegetation is more common.

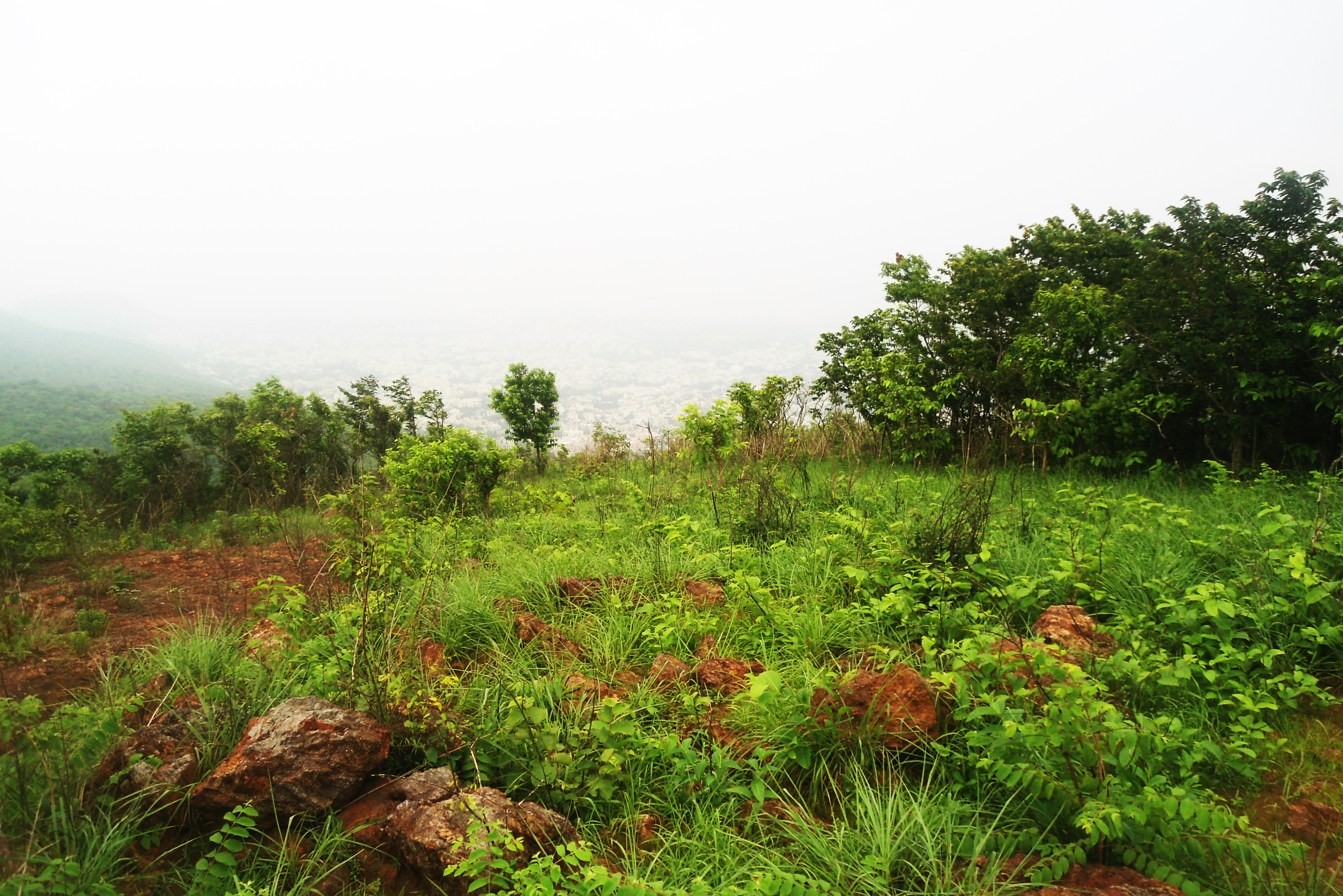
Grassland on Simhachalam Hills

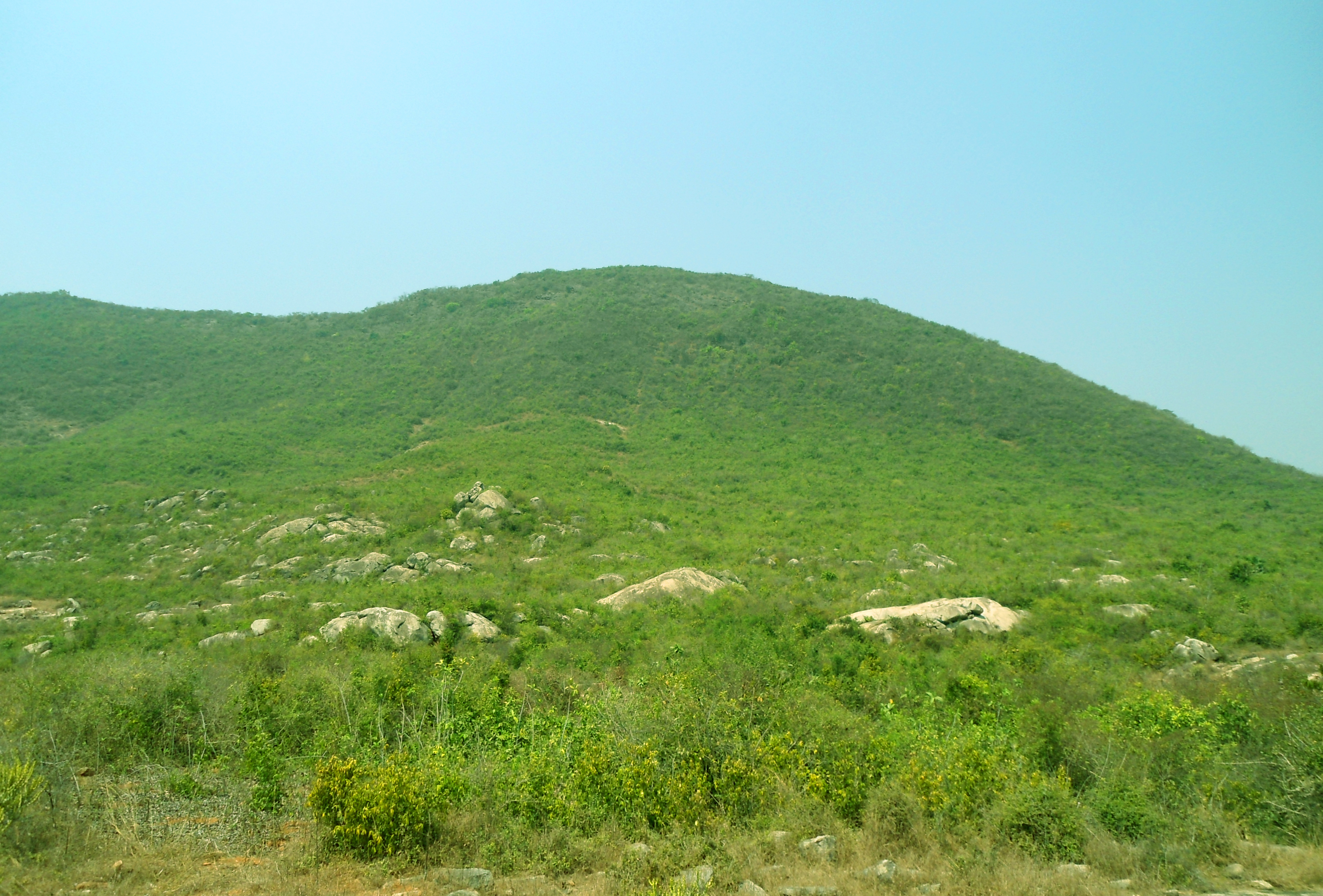
Dry deciduous Jungles at Ramatheertham

== Fauna ==
The varied diversity of fauna includes Bengal tiger, Indian leopard, dholes, blackbucks, sambars, and sea turtles. The dense forests in mountains offer habitat to the wildlife. The state government declared certain areas as wildlife sanctuaries and national parks.

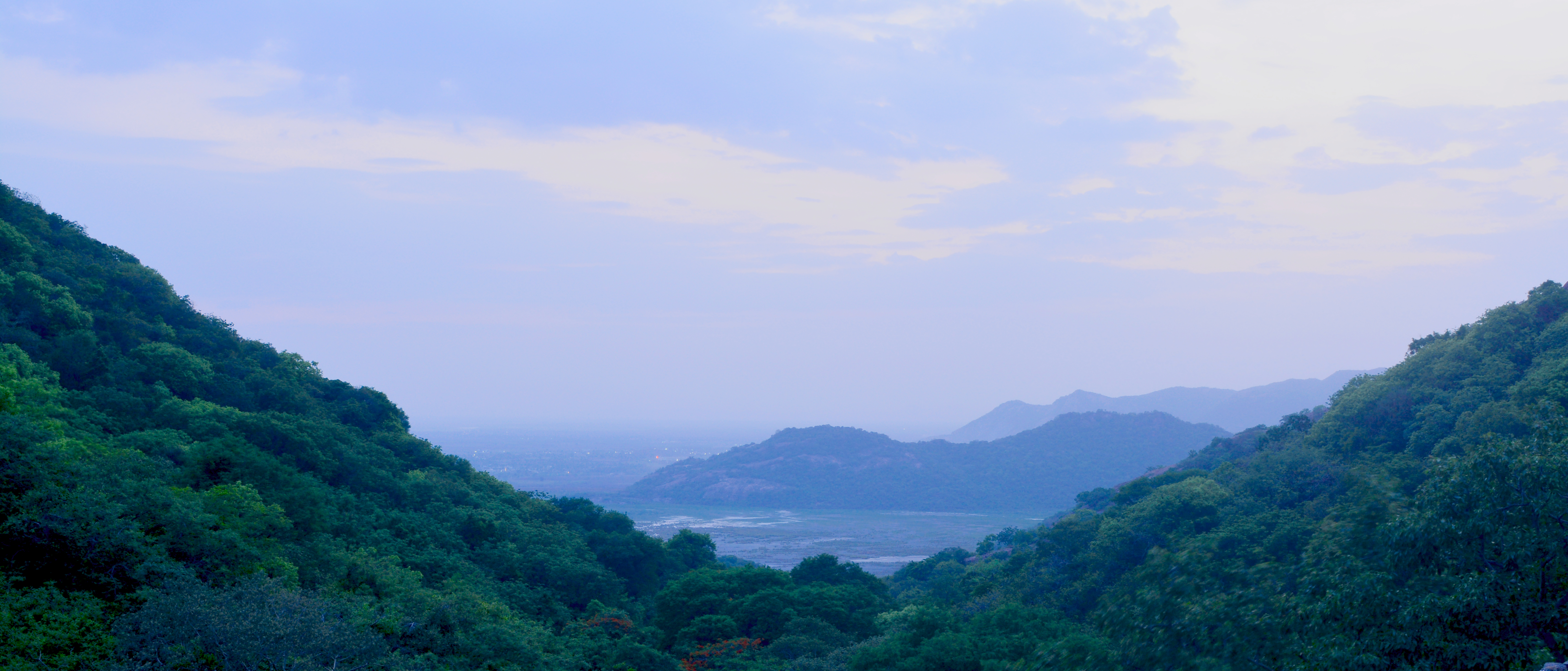
Kondapalli Reserve Forest, Krishna District

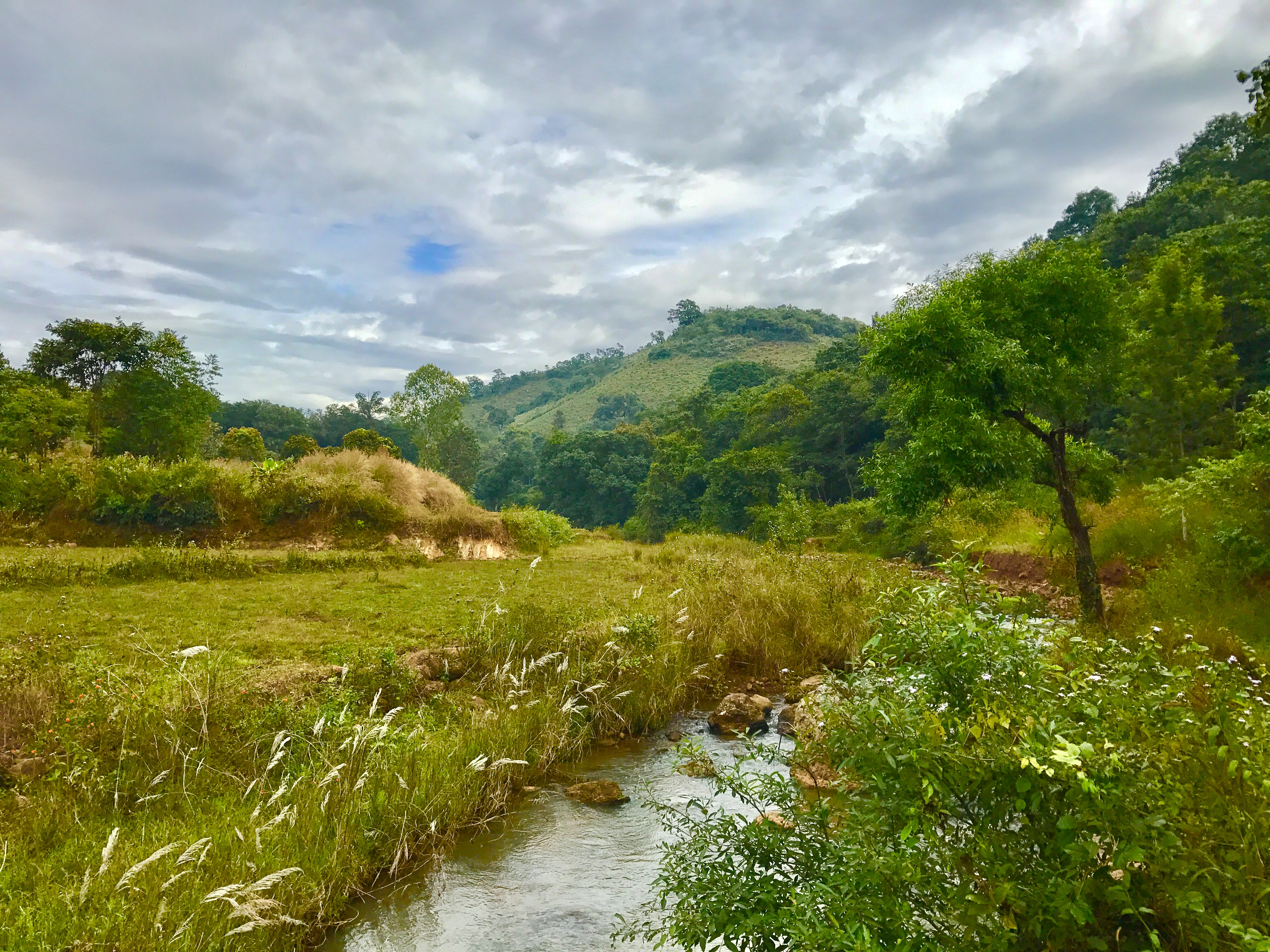
A Valley near lambasinghi

=== National parks and zoo parks ===
Indira Gandhi Zoological Park is located in Visakhapatnam. It is one of the largest zoos of India, spread over an area of 625 acres (253 ha). It was named after Indira Gandhi, the former Prime Minister of India and was opened in 1977. There are eighty species with 800 animals. Hippopotamus and crocodiles are the special animals conserved.

=== Wildlife sanctuaries ===
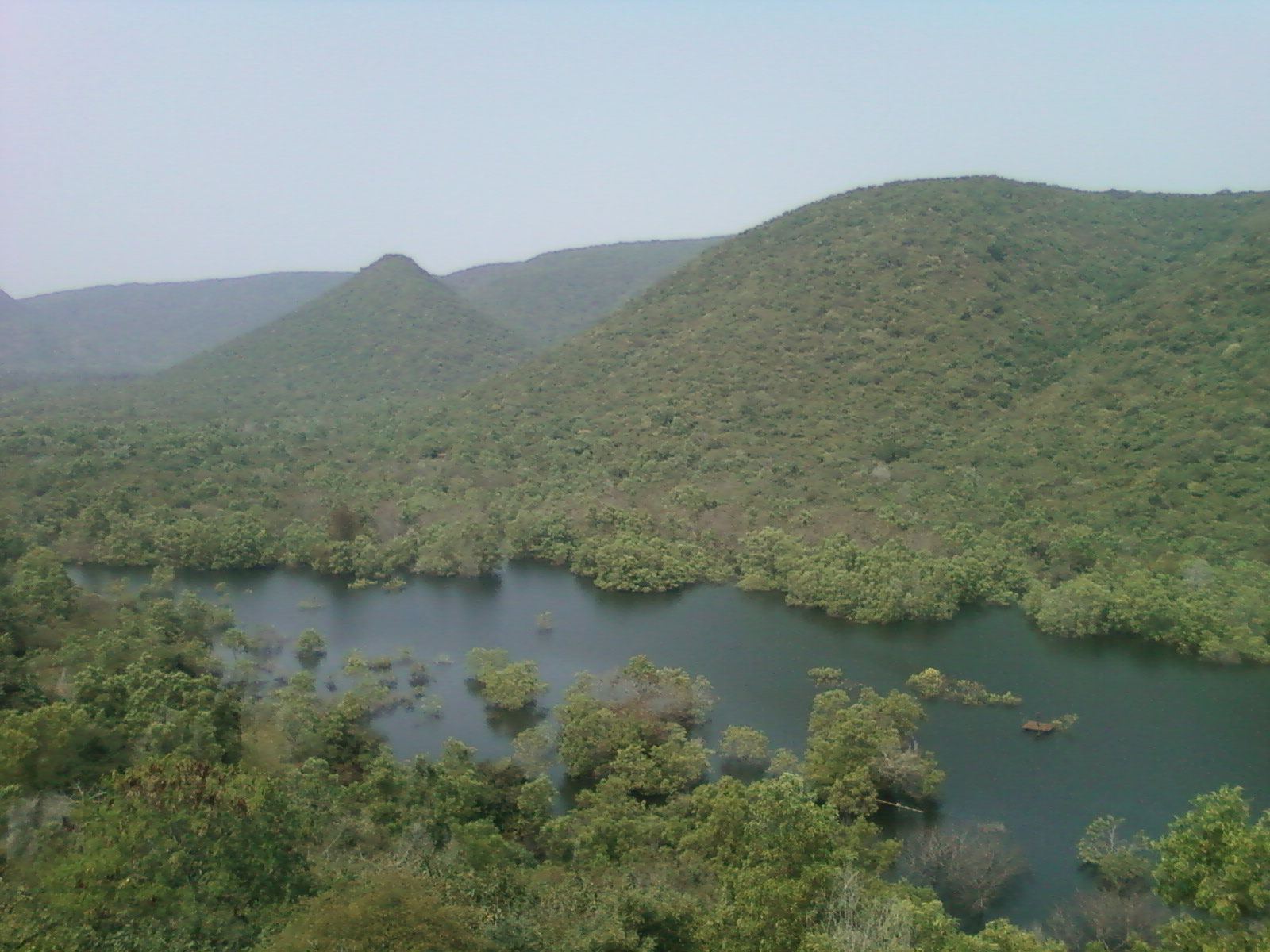
Kambalakonda Wildlife Sanctuary, Visakhapatnam City

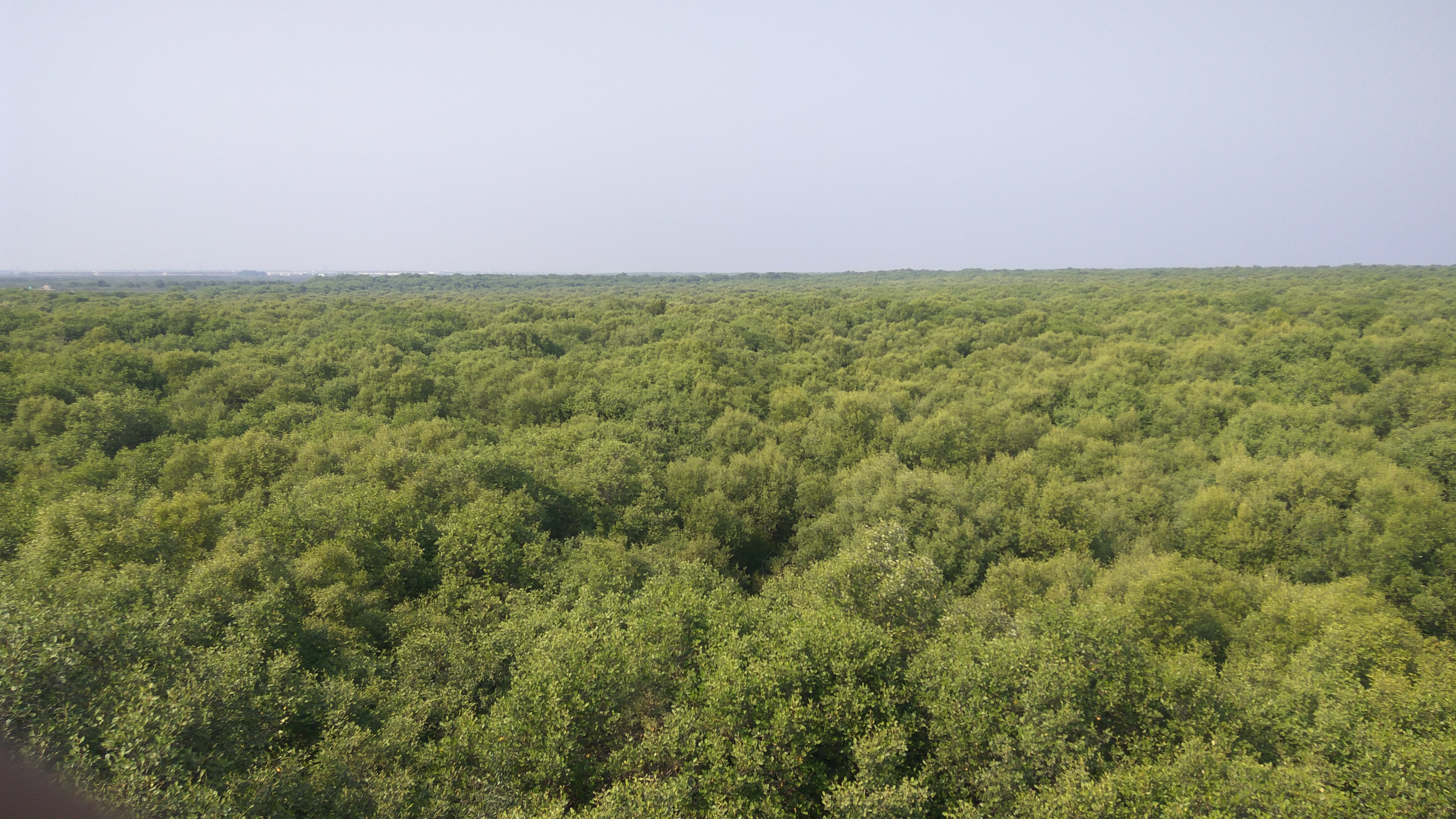
Coringa Wildlife Sanctuary a Mangrove Forest

Kambalakonda Wildlife Sanctuary is situated on NH 5, surrounded by the Eastern Ghats on three sides and the Bay of Bengal on the fourth. It houses Indira Gandhi Zoological Park. The park has almost eighty species with primates, carnivores, mammals, ungulates, reptiles and birds. These include rhesus monkeys, baboons, panthers, tigers, wolves, wild dogs, pythons, tortoises, monitor lizards, elephant, bison, sambar deer, peacocks, ducks and macaws.

Papikonda Wildlife Sanctuary is located in East Godavari, West Godavari in an area of 591 km^{2} (228 mi^{2}). Fauna found in this sanctuary are tigers, leopards, gaur, cheetal, chowsingha, sambar, blackbuck, mouse deer, barking deer, sloth bears, wild dogs, elephants, jackals, wild boar, marsh crocodiles and a variety of birds.

Coringa Wildlife Sanctuary is located in East Godavari district in an area of 235.70 km^{2} (91.00 mi^{2}). It has the rare, endangered smooth Indian otter, fishing cat and estuarine crocodile. Other fauna are jackals, marine turtles, seagulls, storks, ducks and flamingos.

Krishna Wildlife Sanctuary is a wildlife sanctuary and estuary located in Krishna district of Andhra Pradesh. The sanctuary is home for reptiles like the garden lizard, the wall lizard, tortoises and snakes.

Rollapadu Wildlife Sanctuary is a wildlife sanctuary located in Kurnool district of Andhra Pradesh in an area 6.14 km^{2} (2.37 mi^{2}). It is the only habitat in the state for the rare and highly endangered great Indian bustard. The blackbuck, wolf, jackal, bonnet macaque, Russell's viper and cobra are also found.

Sri Penusila Narasimha Wildlife Sanctuary is located in the Nellore District of Andhra Pradesh. It covers an area of 1030.85 km^{2} is managed by the Andhra Pradesh Forest Department

Gundla Brahmeswara Wildlife Sanctuary is located in Kurnool and Prakasam Districts of Andhra Pradesh. It covers an area of 1194 km^{2} is managed by the Andhra Pradesh Forest Department. The last surviving pristine forests of Nallamalai tract, it is rich in plants of ethnobotanical value.

Sri Lankamalleswara Wildlife Sanctuary is located in Kadapa District of Andhra Pradesh. It covers an area of 464.42 km^{2} is managed by the Andhra Pradesh Forest Department

Koundinya Wildlife Sanctuary is located in Chittoor district of Andhra Pradesh. It is only one Asian elephant reserve in Andhra Pradesh. The sanctuary is bordered by the state of Tamil Nadu.

=== Bird sanctuaries ===
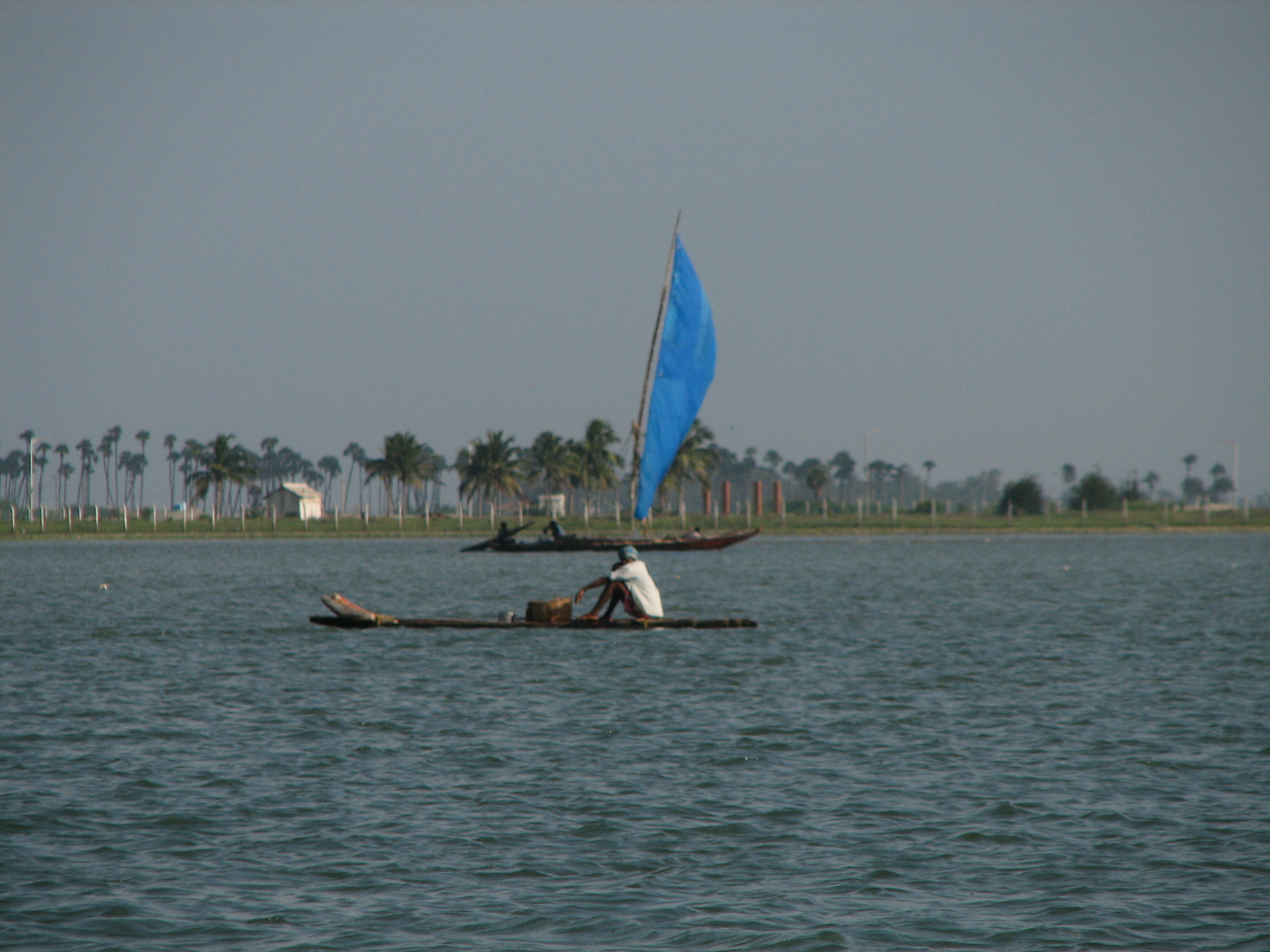
Boats in Pulicat Lake

Atapaka Bird Sanctuary, also known as Kolleru Wildlife Sanctuary (see also Kolleru Bird Sanctuary), is a largest freshwater lake located in West Godavari district of Andhra Pradesh. The sanctuary falls under Kaikalur Forest Range. It is one of the Ramsar convention wetland sites, spread over an area of 308.55 km^{2} (119.13 mi^{2}).

Telineelapuram and Telukunchi Bird Sanctuaries are located in Srikakulam district of Andhra Pradesh. Every year, over 3,000 pelicans and painted storks visit from Siberia to these villages during September and stay until March.

Pulicat Lake Bird Sanctuary is a famous 481 km^{2} Protected area in Nellore District of Andhra Pradesh state. Pulicat Lake is the second largest brackish-water ecosystem in India. Central location is: 13°34′N 80°12′E. 327.33 km^{2} is managed by the Andhra Pradesh Forest Department and 153.67 km^{2} is managed by the Tamil Nadu Forest Department. 108 km^{2} is national park area. Rainfall ranges from 800 to 2000 mm. Temperature varies from 14 °C to 33 °C. Altitude ranges from 100’ MSL to 1200’ MSL.

== See also ==
- Andhra Pradesh Forest Department
