= Andhra Pradesh Forest Department =

Forest department of India

- Forests For Survival

Agency overview
- Jurisdiction: Government of Andhra Pradesh
- Headquarters: Mangalagiri, Andhra Pradesh
- Minister responsible: Sri Konidala Pawan Kalyan, Ministry of Environment, Forest Science and Technology
- Agency executive: Dr. P. V. Chalapathi Rao, IFS, Principal Chief Conservator of Forests (HoFF)
- Website: http://forests.ap.gov.in

Andhra Pradesh Forest Department is one of the administrative divisions of Government of Andhra Pradesh. It is headed by the Principal Chief Conservator of Forests, Head of Forest Force (HOFF), an Indian Forest Service officer. The primary function of this department is protection, conservation and management of forests in the Andhra Pradesh State. The Forest Department is organised into 12 territorial circles and 43 divisions. One Senior Officer of the rank of Deputy Conservator of Forests functions as Planning and Extension Officer in each district.

== Flora and fauna ==
Andhra Pradesh State is bestowed with two river systems of Krishna and Godavari. Andhra Pradesh State Biodiversity Board is a statutory body that maintains and keeps balance of biodiversity in ecosystems, landscapes, heritage sites. The forests in the state can broadly be divided into four major biotic provinces.

1. Deccan Plateau - 53%
2. Central Plateau - 35%
3. Eastern Highland - 11%
4. East Coastal Plains - 1%

The vegetation found in the state is largely of dry deciduous type with a mixture of Teak, and species of the genera Terminalia, Dalbergia, Pterocarpus, Anogeissus etc. Fauna includes Tiger, Panther, Wolf, Wild Dog, Hyena, Sloth Bear, Gaur, Black Buck, Chinkara, Chowsingha, Nilgai, Cheetal, Sambar and a number of Birds and Reptiles.

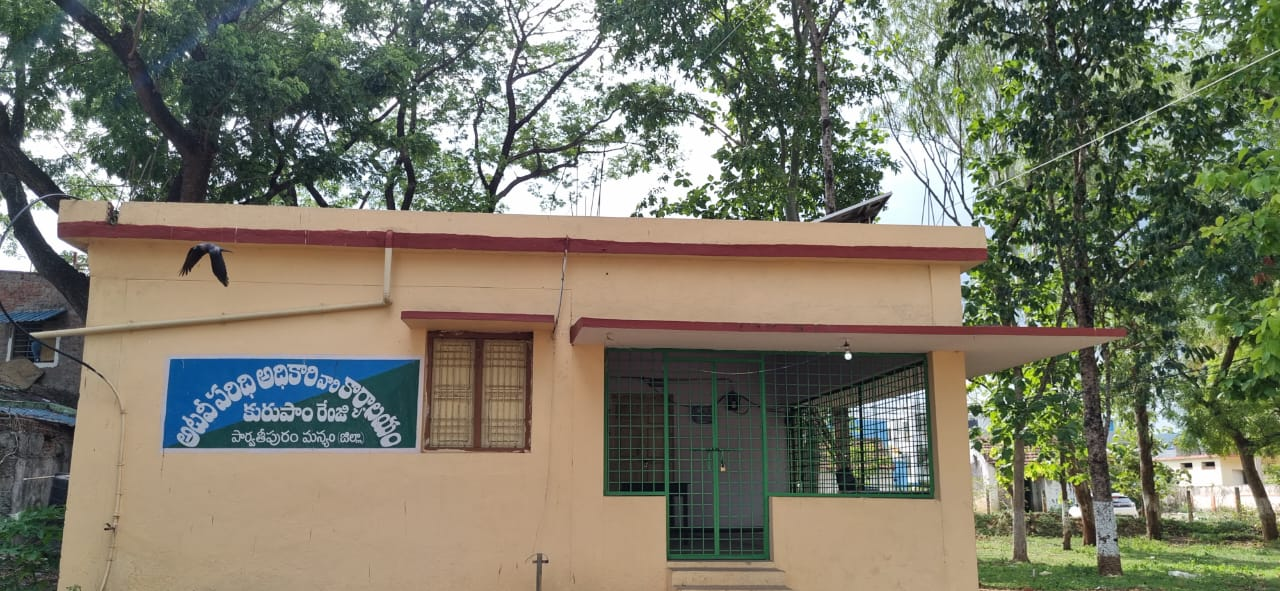
Forest office in Kurupam

The state is a possessor of some rare and endemic plants like Cycas beddomei, Pterocarpus santalinus, Terminalia pallida, Syzygium alternifolium, Shorea talura, Shorea tumburgia, Psilotum nudum etc. Among its rich fauna, the Double Banded or the Jerdon’s courser, the golden gecko, and the gray slender loris are some of the rare and endemic fauna of the state.

== Protected areas ==
Map of wildlife sanctuaries in the Indian state of Andhra Pradesh. Green is National Park, Red denotes Wildlife Sanctuaries, Blue denotes Bird Sanctuaries.

Wild Life Sanctuaries	Area (In km^{2}.)
Coringa Wildlife Sanctuary	235.70
Kolleru Bird Sanctuary	308.55
Kondakarla Ava Bird Sanctuary	1.3
Krishna Wildlife Sanctuary	194.81
Nagarjunasagar Srisailam (Project Tiger)	3568.00
Rolla Padu	6.14
Gundla Brahmeswara Wildlife Sanctuary	1194.00
Sri Lankamalleswara Wildlife Sanctuary	464.42
Nelapattu	4.58
Pulicat Lake Bird Sanctuary	500.00
Koundinya Wildlife Sanctuary (Project Elephant)	357.60
Sri Penusila Narasimha Wildlife Sanctuary	1030.85
Kambalakonda Wildlife Sanctuary	70.70

National Parks	Area (In km^{2}.)
Papikonda National Park	1012.86
Sri Venkateswara National Park	525.97
Rajiv Gandhi National Park (Rameswaram)	2.5

Zoo park	Location	Area (in Acres)
Sri Venkateswara Zoological Park	Tirupati	5,532 acres (22 km^{2})
Indira Gandhi Zoological Park	Visakhapatnam	625 acres (2.5 km^{2})
