= Rajiv Gandhi National Park (Rameswaram) =

National park in Andhra Pradesh, India

- IUCN category II (national park)
- Location within India
- Interactive map of Rajiv Gandhi National Park
- Location: Andhra Pradesh
- Coordinates: 14°43′37″N 78°33′39″E
- Area: 2.4 km^{2} (0.93 sq mi)
- Established: 2005

Rajiv Gandhi National Park is a national park located in Rameswaram of Kadapa District, Andhra Pradesh, India. Its area is about 2.4 square kilometers of tropical dry deciduous forest mostly growing on a sandy soil. It lies on the north bank of the Penna River.

== History ==
The area was originally noticed as "Rameshvaram National Park" on 19 November 2005 and on 26 December 2005 the name was changed to "Rajiv Gandhi National Park". The 500 meter eco-zone around the park was noticed on 15 May 2017.

== Flora ==
Tree species include Dalbergia sissoo, Grewia villosa, and Gymnema sylvestre.

== Fauna ==
The approximately fifty bird species in the area include little egrets, parakeets, and peacocks.

Invertebrates like Scorpions, Spiders, variety of insects like Butterflies, Grasshoppers, Crickets, etc. abound this forest. Amphibian fauna is represented with species like Bullfrog, Common Indian toad, etc. Reptilian fauna includes like Russell's earth boa, Russell's viper, Common skink, etc. Over 50 species of birds like Peacocks, Little egrets, Parakeets; etc are found in this forest. Mammals like Spotted deer, Common mongoose, Black napped hare reside in this sand dune ecosystem.
