= Kolleru Bird Sanctuary =

Sanctuary in Andhra Pradesh, India

Kolleru Bird Sanctuary in Andhra Pradesh
- IUCN category IV (habitat/species management area)
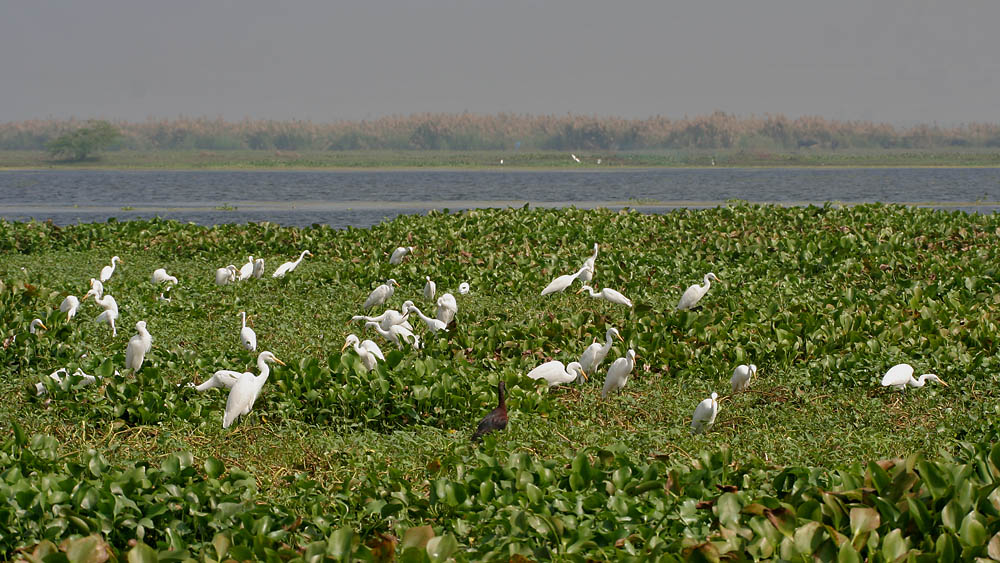
- Birds near Kolleru Lake

- Location within Andhra Pradesh Location within India
- Interactive map of Kolleru Bird Sanctuary in Andhra Pradesh
- Location: Andhra Pradesh, India
- Nearest city: Eluru
- Coordinates: 16°37′N 81°12′E
- Area: 673 km^{2} (166,000 acres)
- Established: November 1999
- Governing body: Andhra Pradesh Forest Department

Ramsar Wetland
- Designated: 19 August 2002

Kolleru Bird Sanctuary is a sanctuary in Andhra Pradesh, India. It covers 673 square kilometers. It was established in November 1999, under the Wildlife Protection Act of 1972. The sanctuary protects part of the Kolleru Lake wetland, which gained Ramsar Convention for International importance in 2002.

== Geography ==
Kolleru Bird Sanctuary is located in the Eluru district of Andhra Pradesh between the River Krishna and River Godavari deltas spread over 10 to 25 km from Eluru City.

== Flora ==
The main flora of the sanctuary is Phragmites karka, a weed that grows up to 10 feet in height and that offers shelter for some species of birds. The aquatic vegetation includes species such as Nymphaeae nouchali, Nyphoides indicum, Ottelia alismoides, Nechamandra alternifolia, Limnophila indica, Vallisneria spiralis, Blyxa octandra, Ipomoea aquatica, Scirpus articulatus, Paspalidium germinatum, Typha angustata, and Phragmites karka.

== Contour dispute ==
Contours are lines depicted on a map, connecting points of equal height above the sea level (mean sea level). In the past, the water level in the lake was between contour 7 and 10 during the monsoon, and it fell to contour 3 during the dry season. The area in contour 3 is 135 square kilometres and the area in contour 10 is 901 square kilometres.

These conditions do not prevail any more with fish tanks and roads occupying most of the lake. The local fishing community known as Suryavansha Vaddis say that from the times of 13th century during Eastern Ganga Dynasty rule they have had descendant rights on Kolleru Lake; they have appealed to the government to decrease from +5 contour (308 km^{2}) to +3 contour (135 km^{2}), asserting that they were protectors of birds from Langula Gajapathi Raju period.

== See also ==
- Bird sanctuaries of India
