= Krishna Wildlife Sanctuary =

Wildlife sanctuary in India

- IUCN category IV (habitat/species management area)
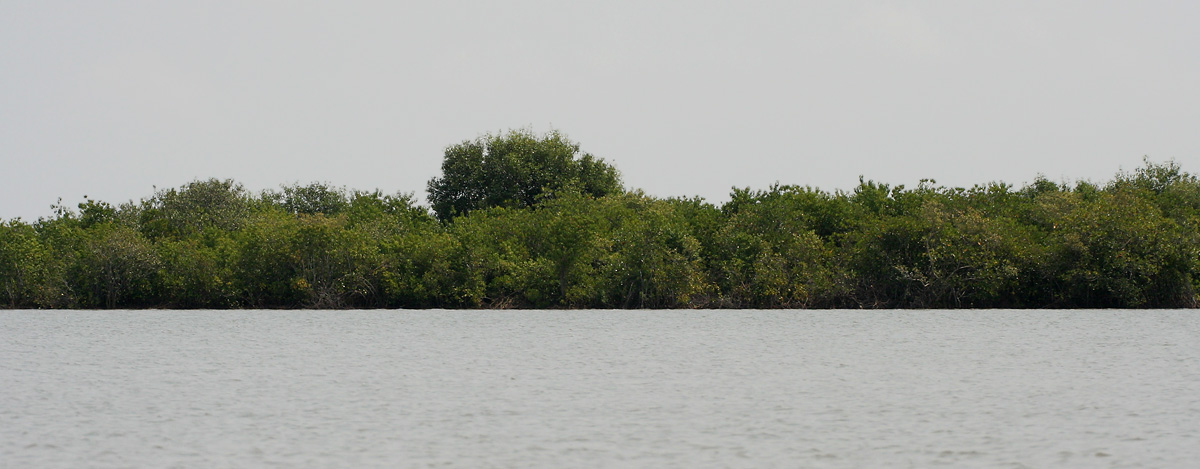
- Mangroves in Krishna Wildlife Sanctuary, Andhra Pradesh, India

- Location within Andhra Pradesh Location within India
- Interactive map of Krishna Wildlife Sanctuary
- Location: Andhra Pradesh, India
- Nearest city: Machilipatnam
- Coordinates: 15°46′27″N 80°56′39″E
- Area: 194.81 km^{2} (48,140 acres)
- Governing body: Andhra Pradesh Forest Department

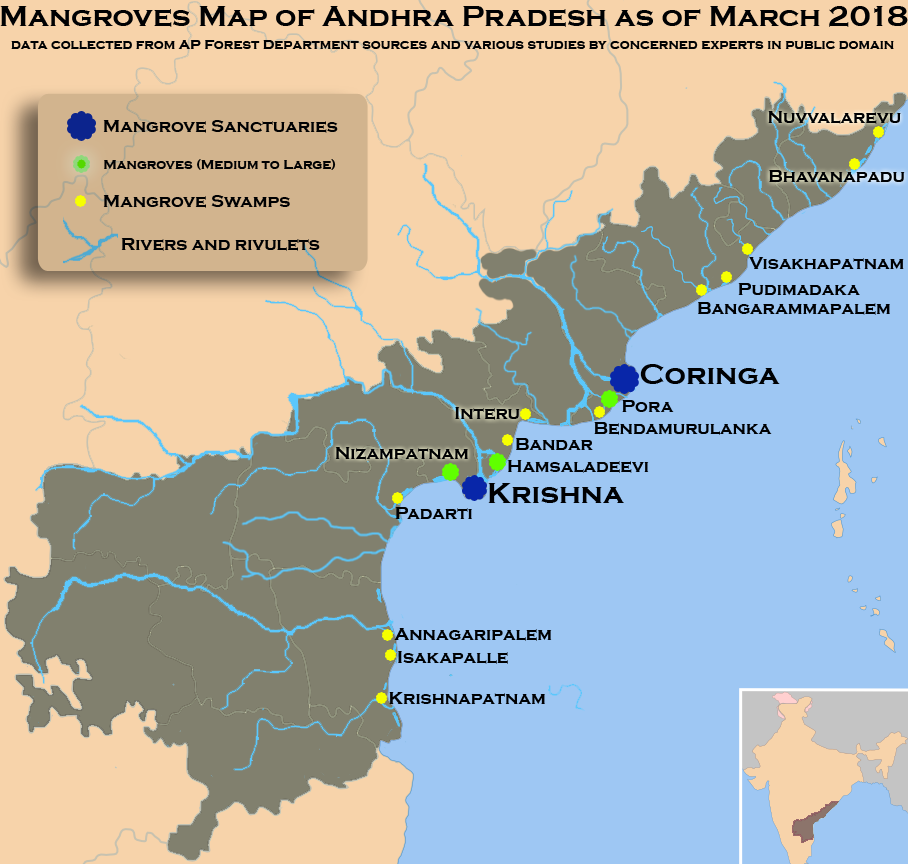
Mangroves map of Andhra Pradesh

Krishna Wildlife Sanctuary is a wildlife sanctuary and estuary located in Andhra Pradesh, India. It is one of the rarest eco-regions of the world because it harbors vast tracts of pristine mangrove forests. It is believed by conservationists to be one of the last remaining tracts of thick primary mangrove forests of South India, which is rapidly disappearing due to absence of protective measures.

== Geography ==
The sanctuary is a part of the mangrove wetland in Andhra Pradesh and are located in the coastal plain of Krishna River delta. The Krishna mangroves lie between 15° 2' N and 15° 55' N in latitude and 80° 42'- 81° 01' E in longitude spread across Krishna and Guntur districts of Andhra Pradesh. It includes Sorlagondi Reserve Forest, Nachugunta Reserve Forest, Yelichetladibba Reserve Forest, Kottapalem Reserve Forest, Molagunta Reserve Forest, Adavuladivi Reserve Forest and Lankivanidibba Reserve Forest. They occupy the islands of the delta and the adjacent mainlands of Krishna and Guntur districts. A part of the mangrove forests is located far from the main mangrove area. This unconnected regions lies near Machilipatnam on its eastern side and Nakshatranagar on its western side.

== Flora and fauna ==
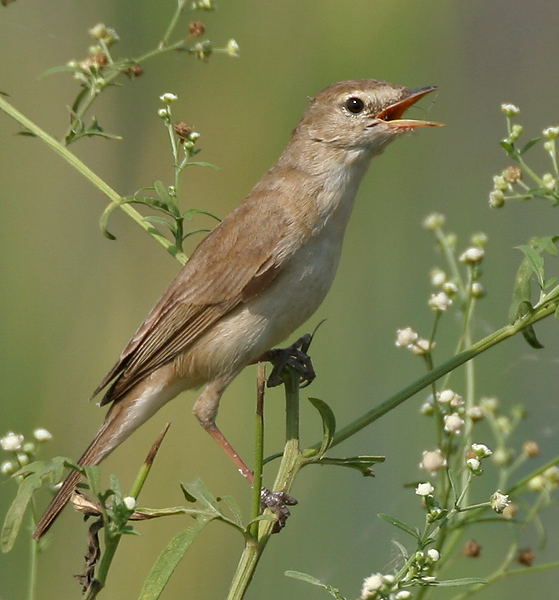
Sykes's warbler (Hippolais rama) in Krishna Wildlife Sanctuary

Some of the tree species in Krishna Wildlife Sanctuary are: Casuarina equisetifolia, Pongamia gladra, Calotropis gigantea, Cassia auriculata, Thespesia populnea, Ipomaea biloba, Spinifex squarrosus, Spinifex littoreus, Pongamia pinnate, Prosopis juliflora, banyan, peepul, margosa, tumma, mango, palmyra.

Fishing cats were recorded between November 2013 and August 2014 at several locations outside Krishna Wildlife Sanctuary.

=== Snakes ===
Snakes of the area include:

Common name	Formal name	Status	Common name	Formal name	Status
Indian python	Python molurus	-	Common cobra	Naja naja	–
Common sand boa	Eryx conicus	–	Russell's viper	Vipera russelli	–
John's sand boa	Eryx johnii	–	Saw-scaled viper	Echis carinatus	–
Common wolf snake	Lycodon aulicus	–	Bamboo pit viper	Trimeresurus gramineus	–
Common kukri snake	Oligodon arnensis	–	Shaw's wolf snake	Lycodon striatus	rare
Striped keelback snake	Amphiesma stolata	–	Twin-spotted wolf snake	Lycodon jara	rare
Chequered keelback snake	Fowlea piscator	–	Gunther's racer	Argyrogena gracilis	rare
Common trinket snake	Elaphe helena	–	Smooth snake	Wallophis brachyura	rare
Rat snake	Ptyas mucosus	–	Painted bronzeback	Dendrelaphis pictus	rare
Common Indian bronzeback	Dendrelaphis tristis	–	Condanorus sand snake	Psammophis condanarus	rare
Common green whip snake / Asian vine snake	Ahaetulla nasuta	–	Stout sand snake	Psammophis longifrons	rare
Common cat snake	Boiga trigonata	–	King cobra	Ophiophagus hannah	rare
Common krait	Bungarus caeruleus	–			

The amphibian fauna present in the sanctuary include the common frog, the otter and the saltwater crocodile. The herbivorous species present are spotted deer, sambar and black buck. Other species found in the sanctuary are jungle cat, fox and bear. Avifauna include crested serpent eagle, Indian roller, wagtails and pipits.

== See also ==
- Wildlife in India
