= Kondakarla Ava =

Lake and bird sanctuary in Andhra Pradesh, South India

- Kondakarla Bird Sanctuary
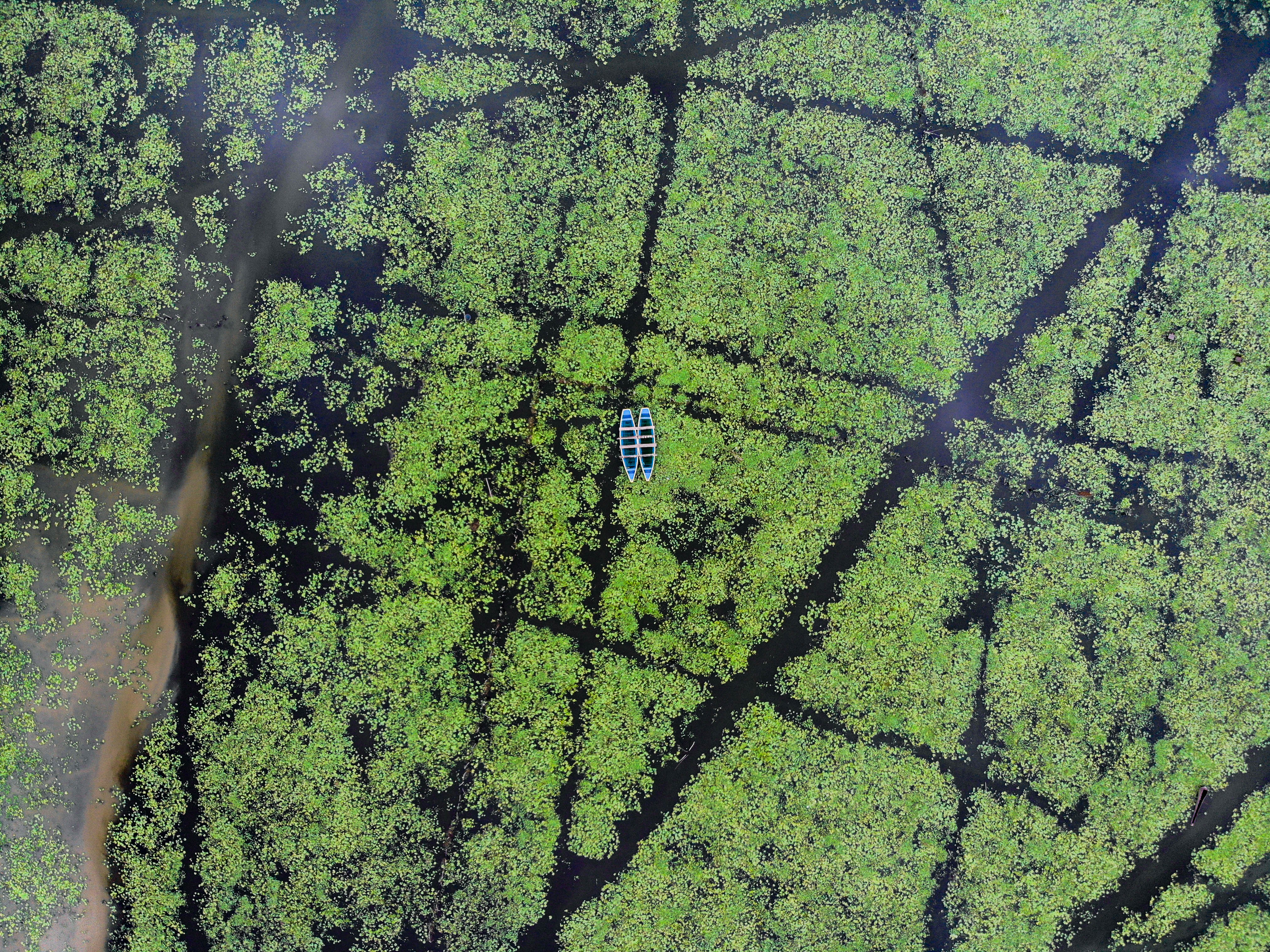
- Kondakarla Ava Lake

- Location within Andhra Pradesh
- Location: Andhra Pradesh, India
- Nearest city: Anakapalli district
- Coordinates: 17°36′03″N 82°59′53″E
- Governing body: Andhra Pradesh Tourism Development Corporation

Kondakarla Ava is a lake and bird sanctuary in Anakapalli district in Andhra Pradesh state in South India. It has a unique and endangered forest in the foothills of the Eastern Ghats.

== Geography ==
Kondakarla Ava is located in Anakapalli District of Andhra Pradesh, in Kondakarla village, Atchutapuram Mandal. It is managed by the Andhra Pradesh Tourism Development Corporation and Kondakarla Panchayat. The sanctuary comprises a unique and endangered forest type and the wet evergreen forests. It is recognized as an eco-tourism destination, with an area of 405 square kilometers.

== Flora and fauna ==
The sanctuary is a wet evergreen forest with waterfowl including shelducks, common teals, northern pintails and Asian open-billed storks and plants including Typha angustata, Nymphoides indica, Azolla filiculoides, and Pistia stratiotes.
