= Sri Penusila Narasimha Wildlife Sanctuary =

Protected area in Andhra Pradesh, India

- IUCN category IV (habitat/species management area)
- Location within Andhra Pradesh Location within India
- Interactive map of Sri Penusila Narasimha Wildlife Sanctuary
- Location: Andhra Pradesh, India
- Nearest city: Kadapa, India
- Coordinates: 14°00′33″N 79°27′50″E
- Area: 1,030.85 square kilometres (254,730 acres)
- Website: Official website

Sri Penusila Narasimha Wildlife Sanctuary is a 1,030.85 km^{2} (398.01 sq mi) protected area in Nellore, Tirupati and Kadapa Districts of Andhra Pradesh state in South India. It comprises a unique and endangered forest type viz.

== Geography ==
Sri Penusila Narasimha Wildlife Sanctuary is located in Nellore, Tirupati and Kadapa Districts of Andhra Pradesh. It covers an area of 1,030.85 km^{2} (398.01 sq mi) is managed by the Andhra Pradesh Forest Department Comprises a unique and endangered forest type viz. the dry evergreen forests. The wildlife sanctuary is characterized by hilly slopes, rolling forested hills, and low valleys.

== Flora ==
Dry evergreen forest type with species like Acacias, Cassias, Pongamia, Carissa are found in the sanctuary.

== Fauna ==
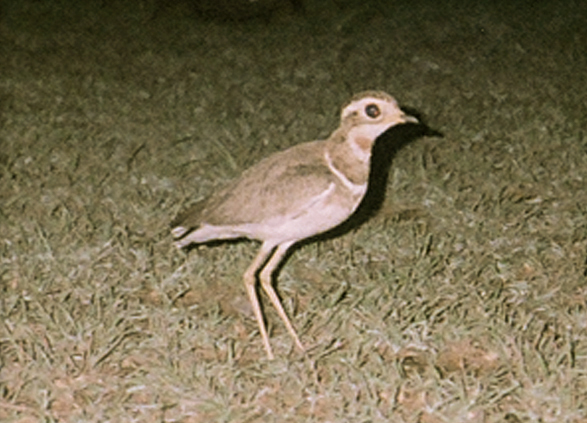
Jerdon's courser

Panther, Cheetal, Nilgai, Chowsingha, Sloth Bear, Jackal, Wild Boar, and large numbers of reptile and bird species are found in the wildlife sanctuary.

The sanctuary also holds a population of tigers and leopards. The sanctuary also hosts the endangered bird Jerdon's courser which is endemic to the region.
