= Gundla Brahmeswaram Wildlife Sanctuary =

Wildlife sanctuary in Andhra Pradesh, India

- IUCN category IV (habitat/species management area)
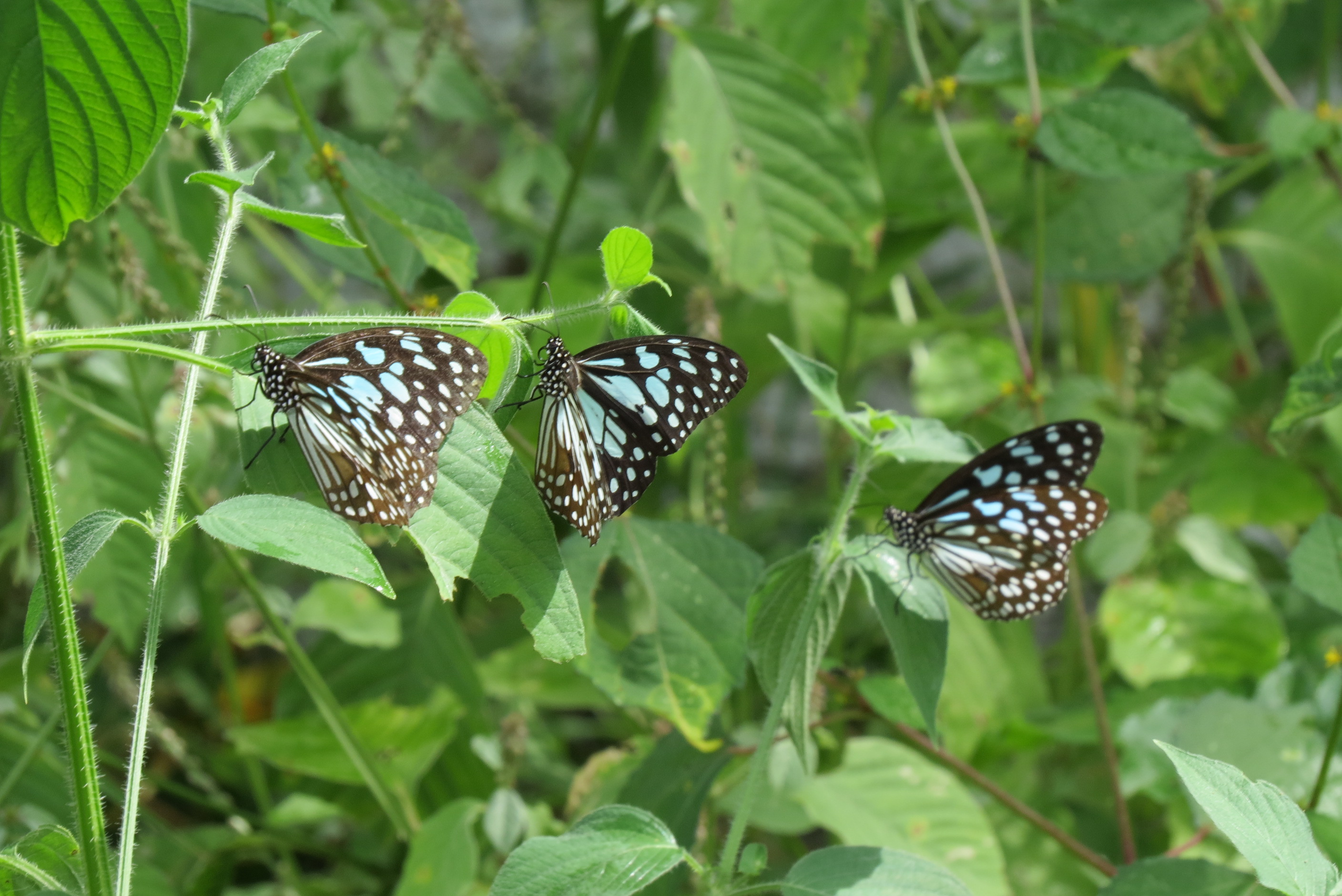
- Blue tiger (Tirumala limniace) butterflies in the Gundla Brahmeswaram Wildlife Sanctuary

- Location within Andhra Pradesh Location within India
- Interactive map of Gundla Brahmeswaram Wildlife Sanctuary
- Location: Nandyal district, Andhra Pradesh, India
- Coordinates: 15°39′40″N 78°44′43″E
- Area: 1,194 km^{2} (461.0 sq mi)
- Established: 1990
- Governing body: Department of forests, Government of Andhra Pradesh

Gundla Brahmeshwaram Wildlife Sanctuary is a wildlife sanctuary located in the Nallamala Forest in Kurnool district of Andhra Pradesh, India. The northern part of the sanctuary is an important part of the Nagarjunsagar-Srisailam Tiger Reserve.

== History ==
Gundla Brahmeshwaram Wildlife Sanctuary declared wildlife sanctuary on September 18, 1990. The sanctuary got its name from the Gundla Brahmeshwaram plateau.

== Description ==
Gundla Brahmeshwara Wildlife Sanctuary is a wildlife sanctuary located in the Nallamala Forest in Kurnool district of Andhra Pradesh, India. It is located between Mantralamma kanuma and Nandi kanuma hill passes. The sanctuary covers an area of 1,194 km^{2} (461.0 sq mi). The northern part of the sanctuary is an important part of the Nagarjunsagar-Srisailam Tiger Reserve. The Gundlakamma River flows through the sanctuary.

== Flora and fauna ==
353 species of plants including ten critically endangered species are seen here. The mammals in the Gundala Brahmeshwara Sanctuary includes langurs, panthers, tigers, rats, rusty-spotted cat, Indian flying squirrel, lesser woolly horseshoe bat, mouse deer, pangolin, Sambar deer, Nilgai and Bonnet macaques. In a survey conducted in 2019, 23 tigers were found in the sanctuary, of which 17 were female tigers, five were male tigers and one was a tiger cub.

== Threats ==
The indigenous biodiversity in the Gundla Brahmeswaram Wildlife Sanctuary is under threat by many invasive plant taxa.
