= Indira Gandhi Zoological Park =

Zoo in Visakhapatnam, India

Indira Gandhi Zoological Park Vizag Zoo
- Interactive map of Indira Gandhi Zoological Park; Vizag Zoo
- 17.7691°N 83.3500°E
- Date opened: 1977
- Location: Visakhapatnam, Andhra Pradesh, India
- Land area: 625 acres (253 ha)
- No. of animals: 850
- No. of species: 75
- Annual visitors: 10 million
- Memberships: CZA, WAZA
- Website: vizagzoo.in

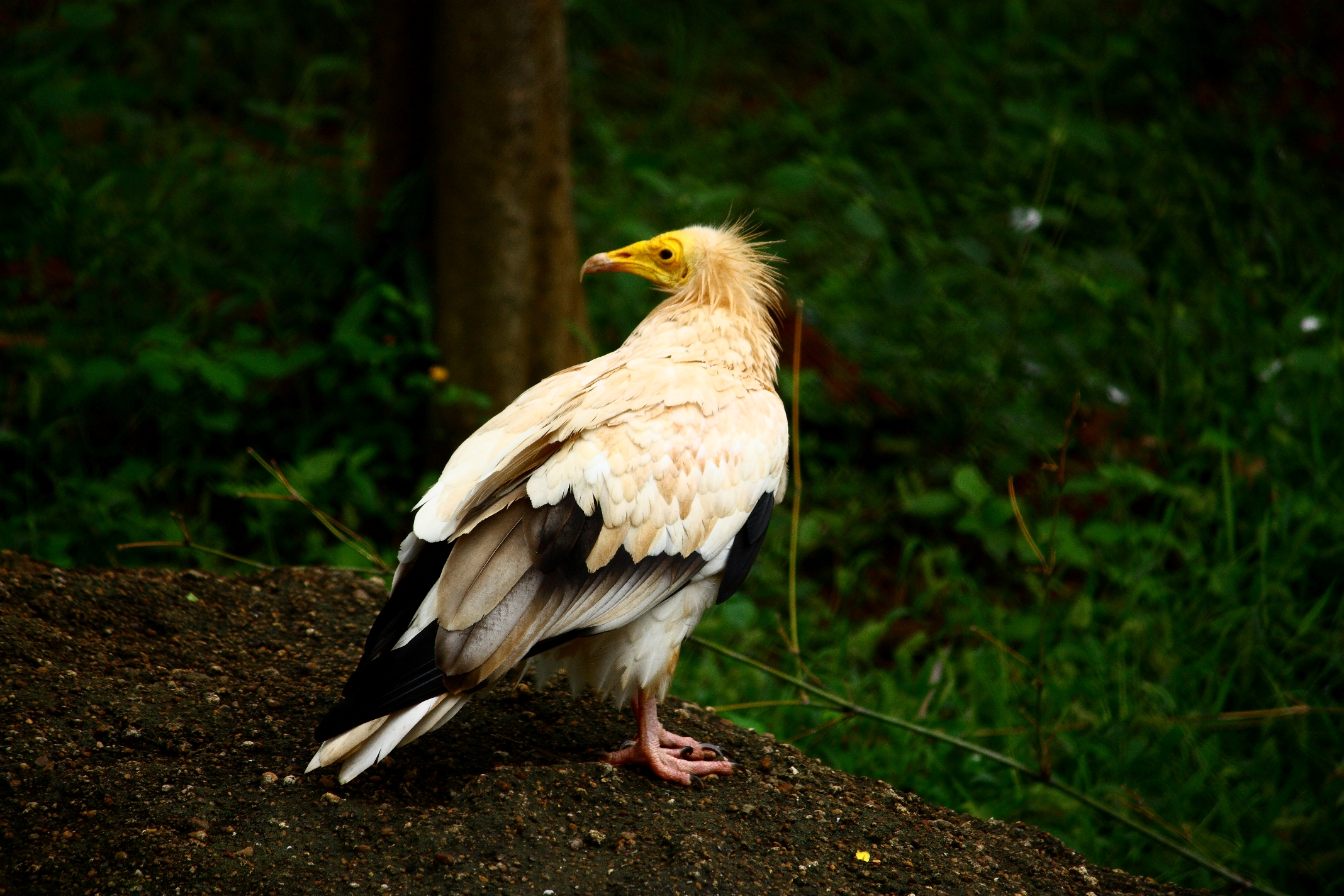
Egyptian vulture

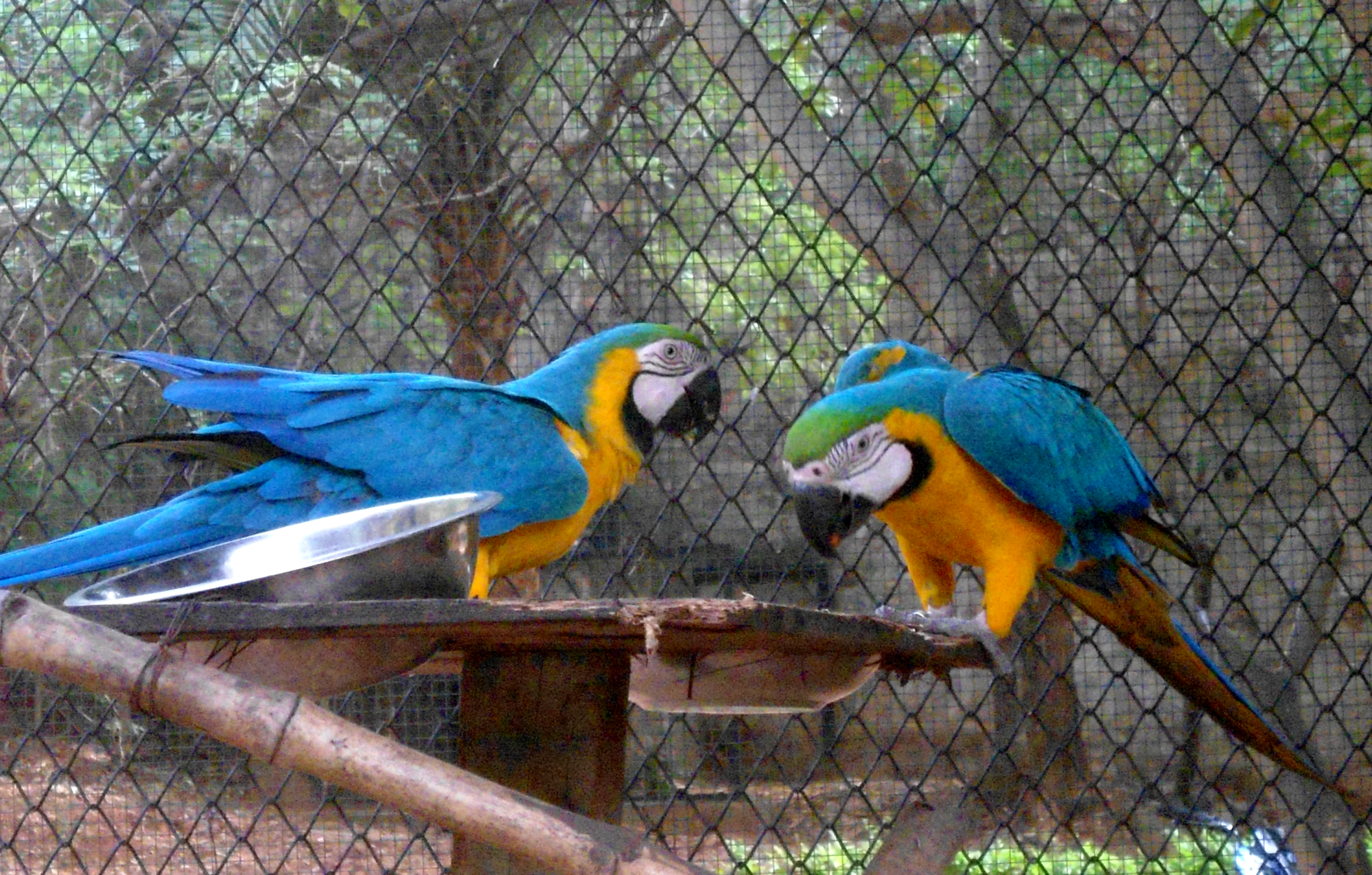
Blue-and-yellow macaw

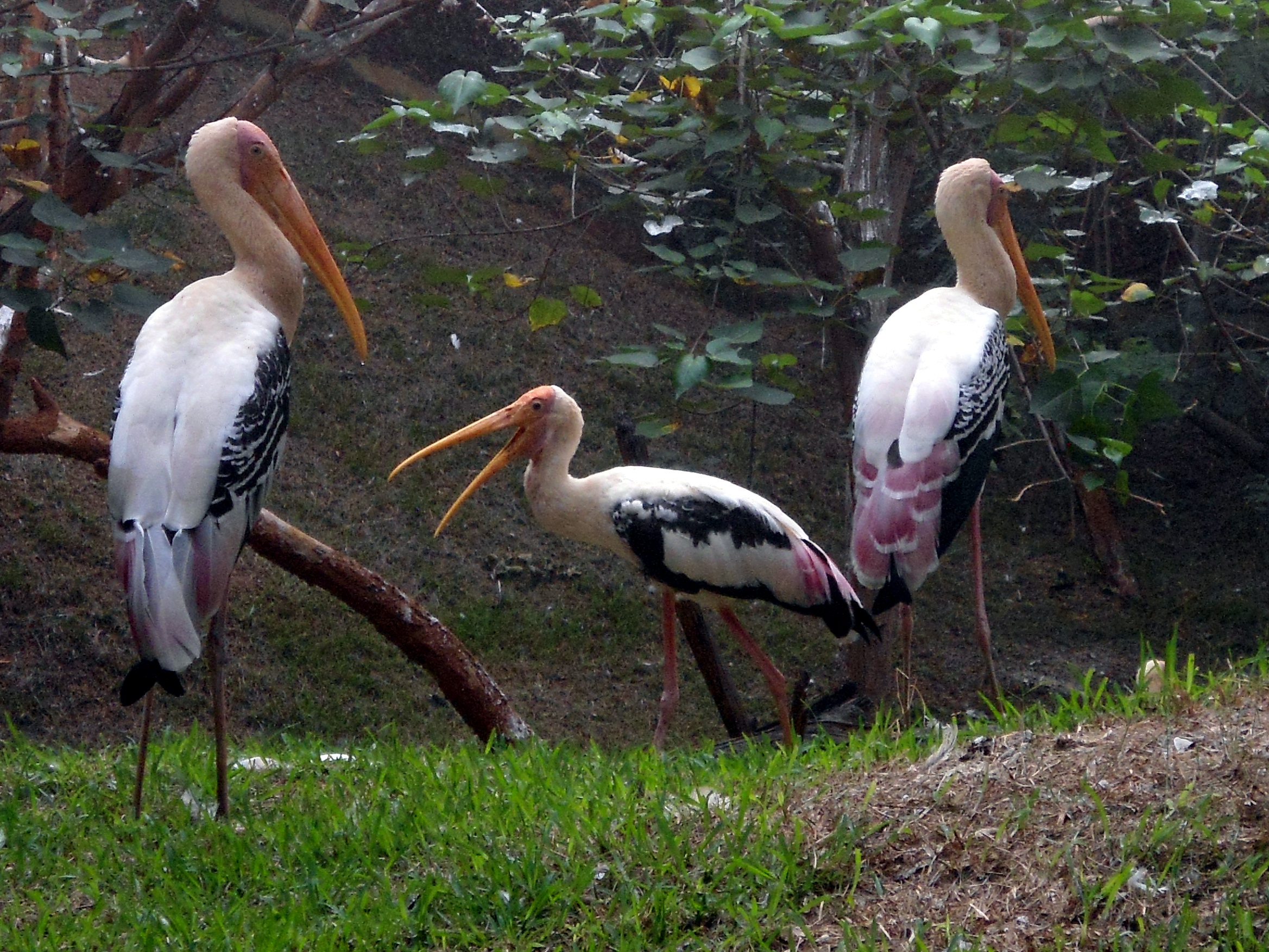
Painted stork

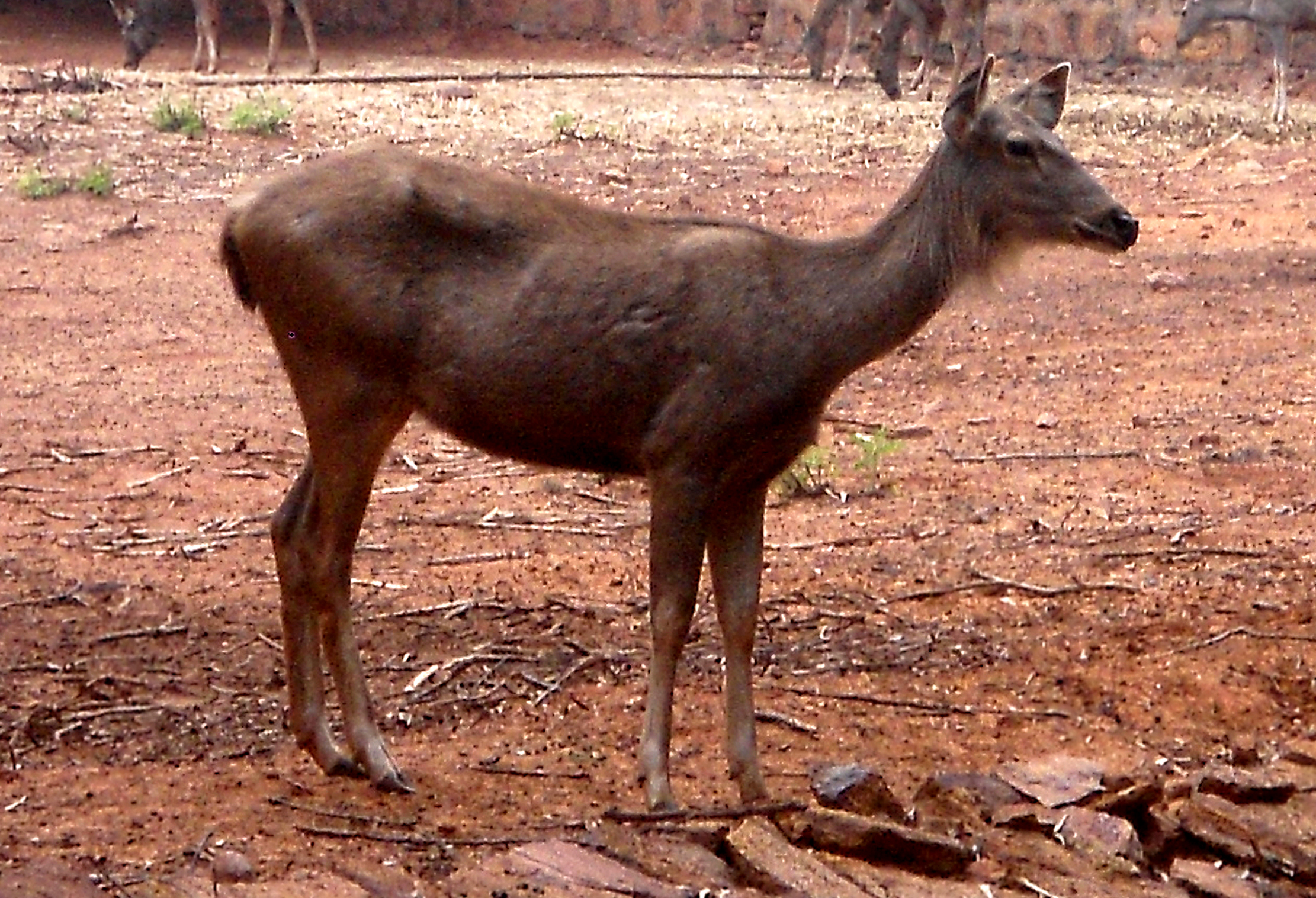
Sambar deer

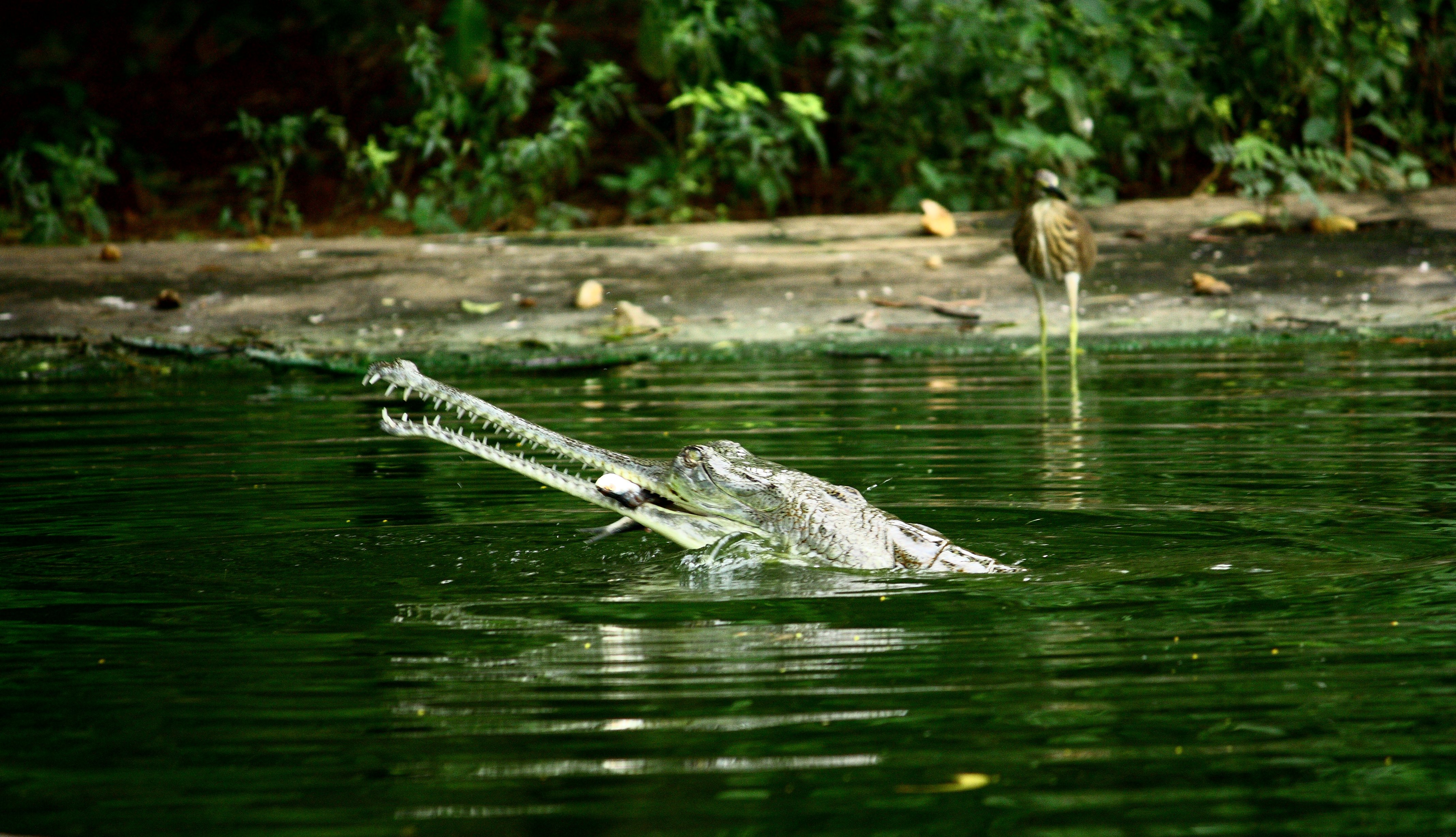
Gharial

Indira Gandhi Zoological Park is located amidst Kambalakonda Reserve Forest in Visakhapatnam, Andhra Pradesh, India. It is the third largest zoo in the country.

The zoological park is named after the former Prime Minister of India, Indira Gandhi. It was declared open to the public on 19 May 1977. It covers an area of 625 acres (253 ha). It is situated in Visakhapatnam amidst the scenic Eastern Ghats of India. It is surrounded by the Eastern Ghats on three sides and Bay of Bengal on the fourth side. Nearly eighty species of animals numbering to about eight hundred are present in the zoo.

In collaboration with Stardust Ventures, Vizag zoo launched a web portal for animal adoption, to engage the community with latest events. It also allows general public to adopt an animal for certain time period. IGZP conducts various events regularly, like E-Webinars and Quizzes and also provides E-Certificates for the participants. The webinars are interactive sessions organized with various experts, and are streamed live over YouTube.

The zoo is about 11 kilometres (6.8 mi) from the Visakhapatnam railway station on the National Highway 5 near Yendada. It has entrance and exit gates situated oppositely, with one towards National Highway 5 and the other towards Beach Road at Sagar Nagar. It is open to public daily except Monday.

In February 2022, the zoo was received accreditation from the World Association or Zoos and Aquariums (WAZA) for coordinating a successful dhole breeding programme.

== Exhibits ==
In an area of 625 acres (253 ha) the zoo located among the Kambalakonda Wildlife Sanctuary of the Eastern Ghats, the zoo has enclosures for many different types of animals, a jungle along a water body inside the zoo park. The zoo has several native mammals such as Indian elephants, greater one-horned rhinos, Bengal tigers, Asiatic lions, Indian leopards, striped hyenas, dholes, sloth bears, gaur, sambar deer and rhesus macaques, as well as exotic mammals like hippos, giraffes, Grant's zebras and chimpanzees. It also has a variety of birds including ostriches, rosy pelicans, grey herons, Indian peafowl and black swans. All three native species of crocodilian, the mugger crocodile, gharial and saltwater crocodile are housed in the zoo, along with several other species of reptiles.

== Death of animal keeper ==
In November 2023, an animal keeper B. Nagesh Babu, 23, died after he was attacked by a Himalayan black bear. While on duty, he seems to have kept the doors open while feeding the animals in the night. An ex-gratia of Rs.10 lakhs was announced for the family.

== Gallery ==
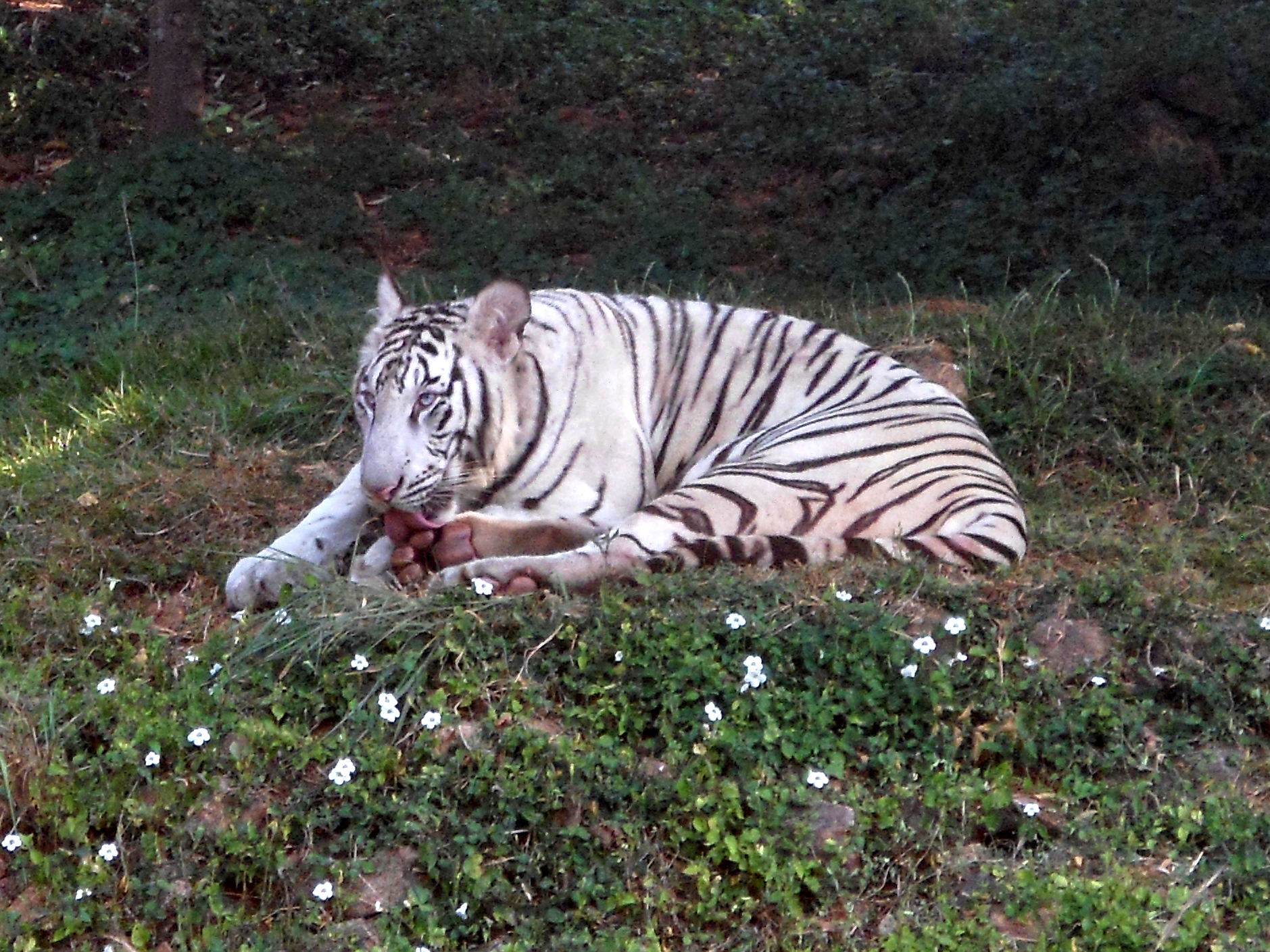
White tiger

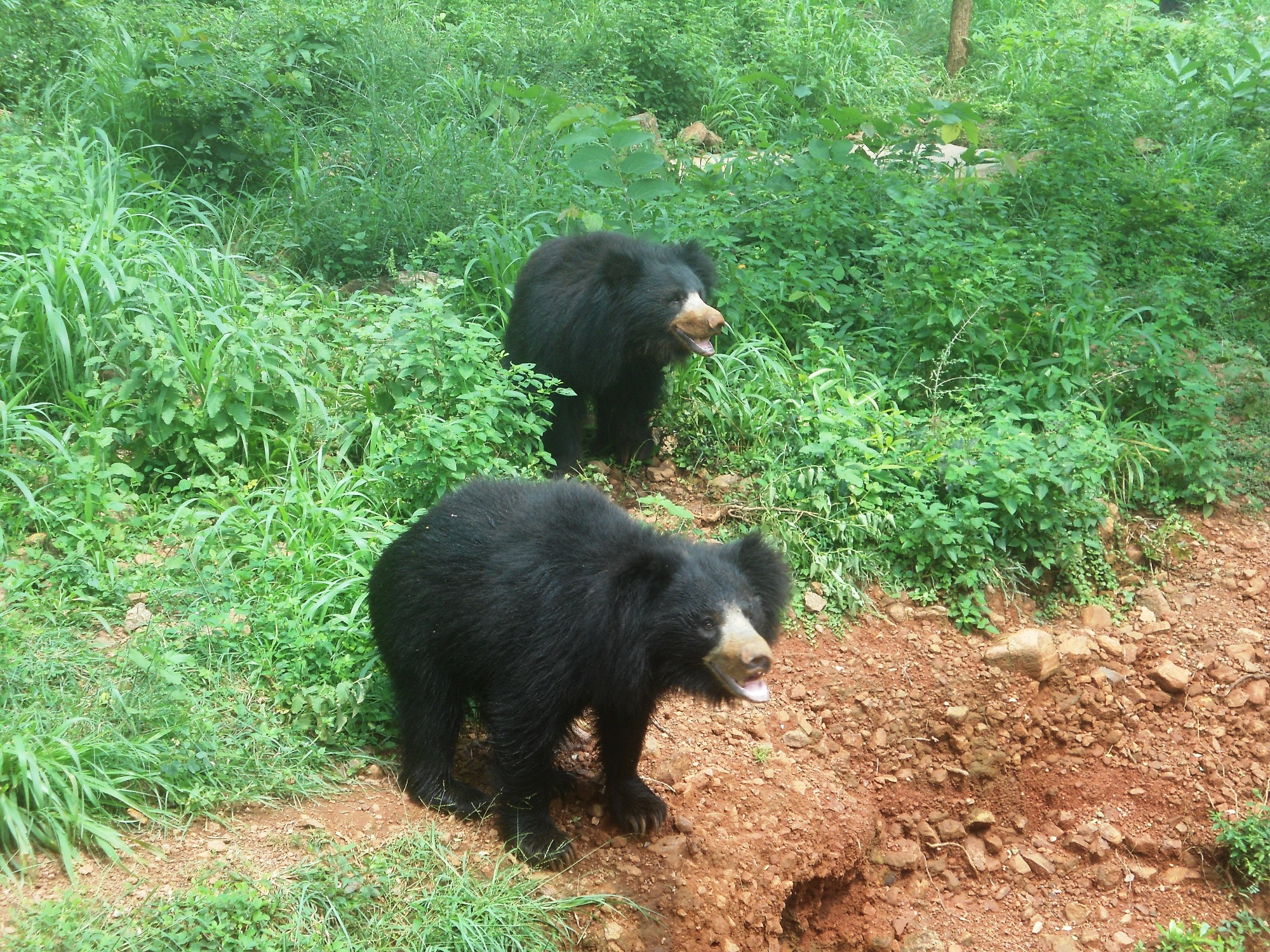
Sloth bear

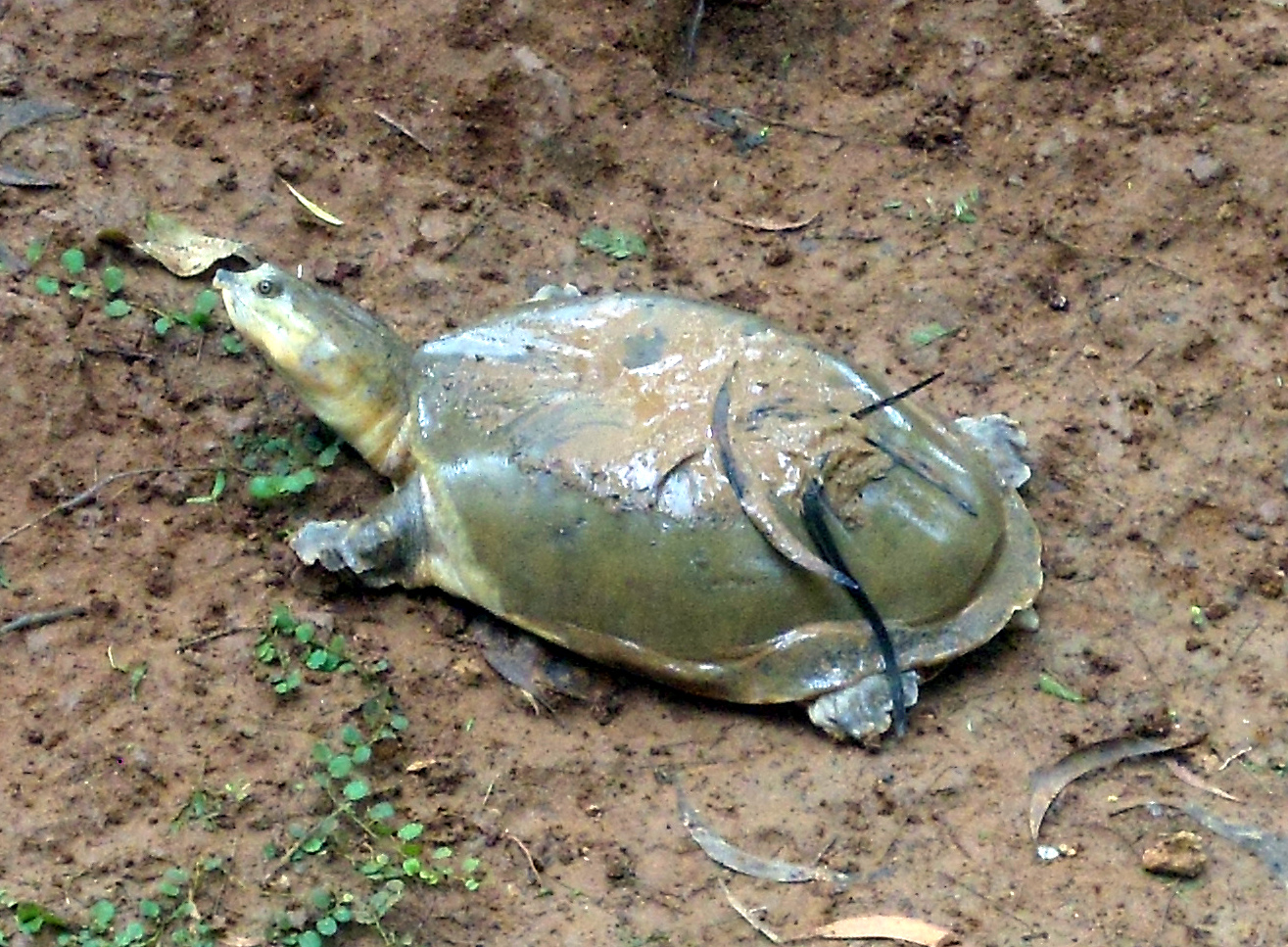
Indian black turtle

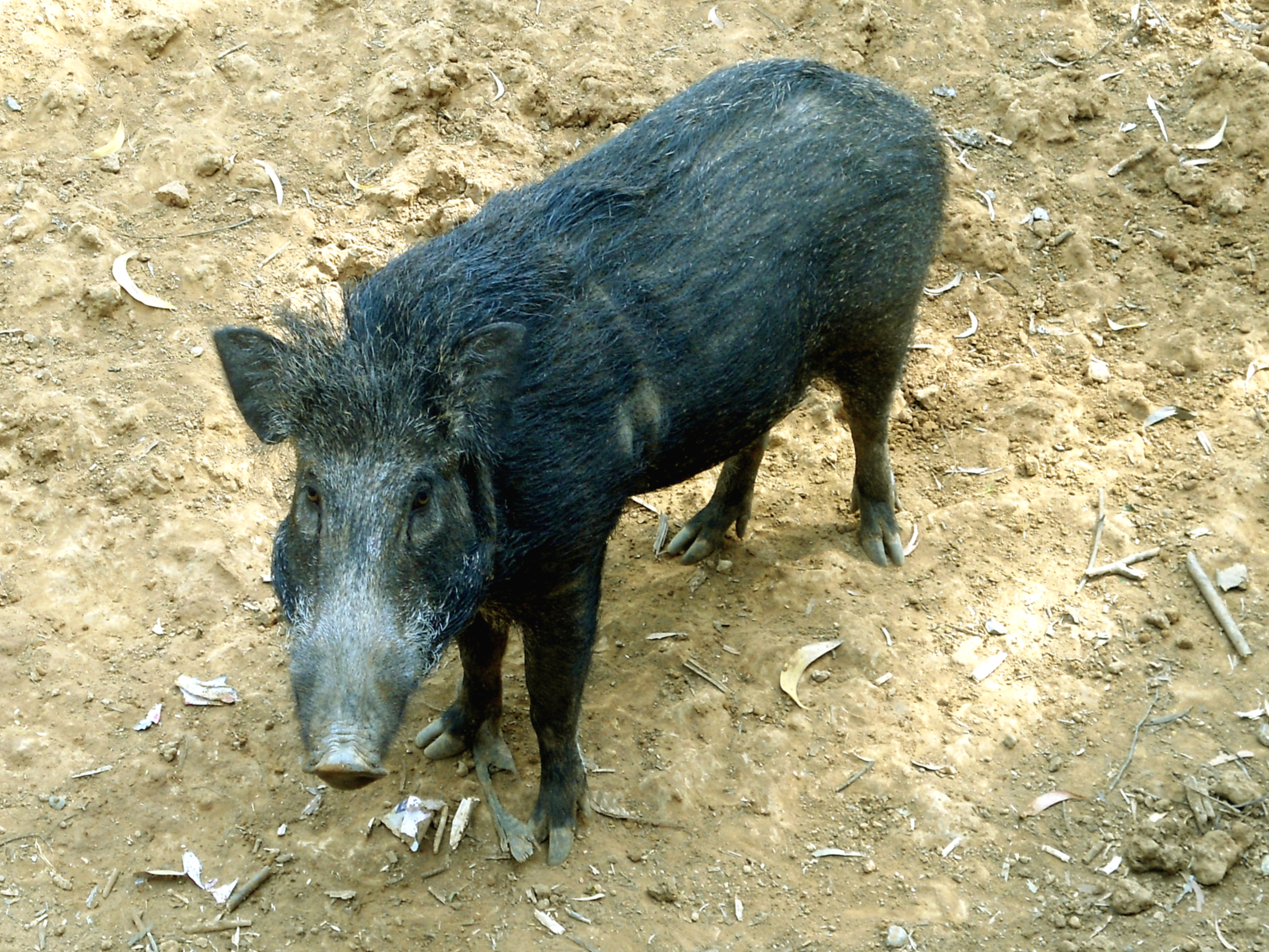
Wild boar

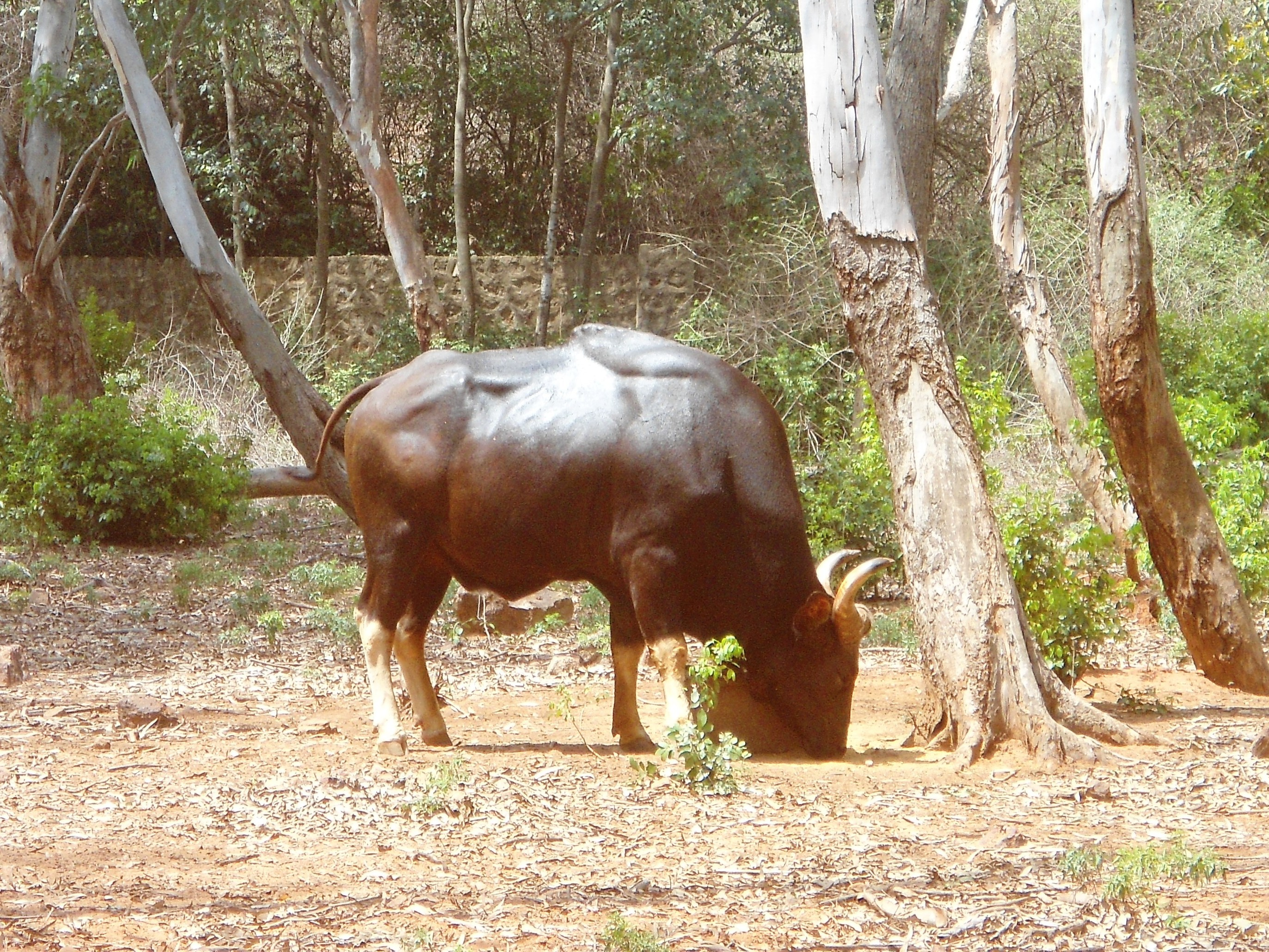
Gaur

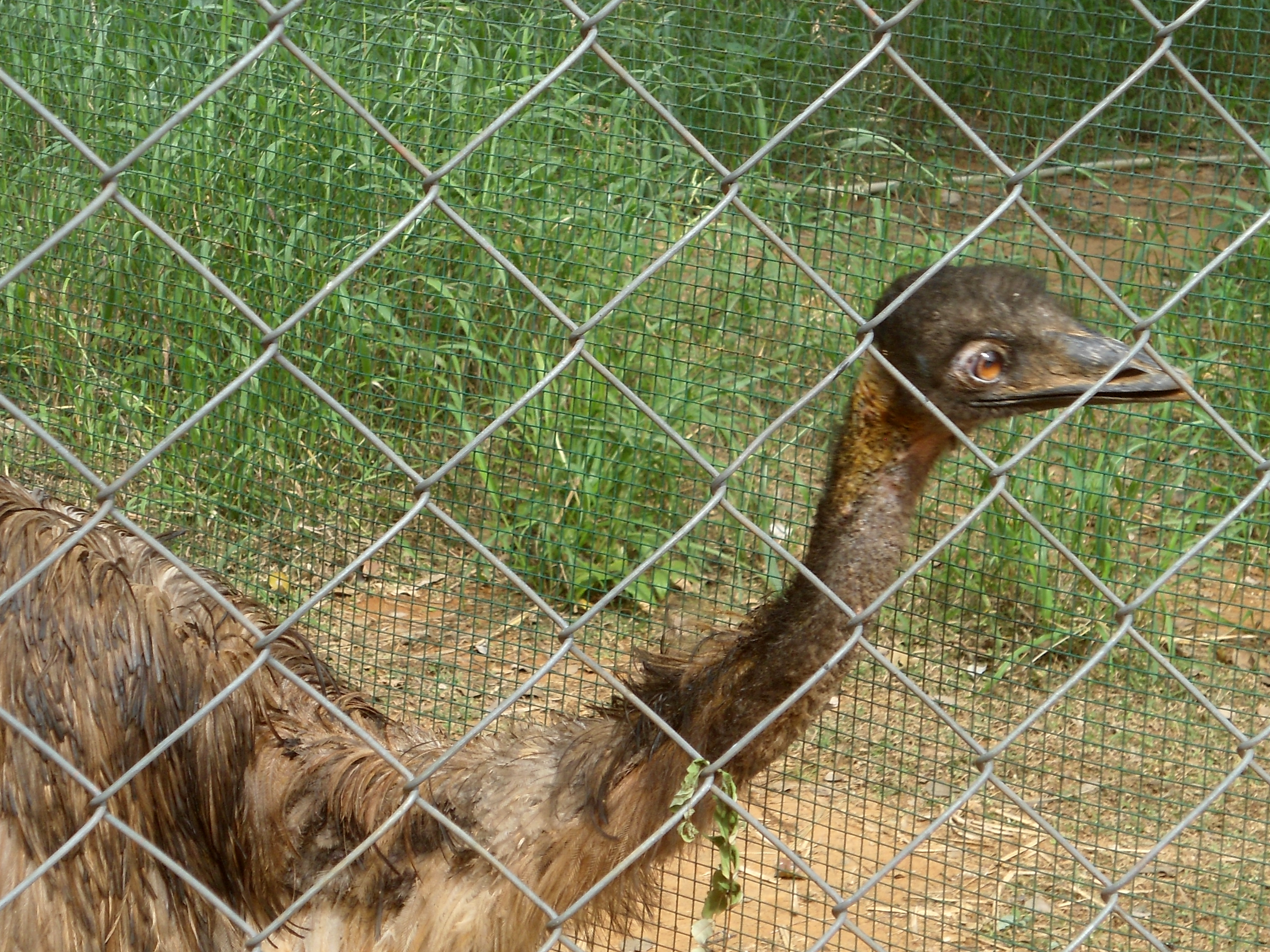
Emu

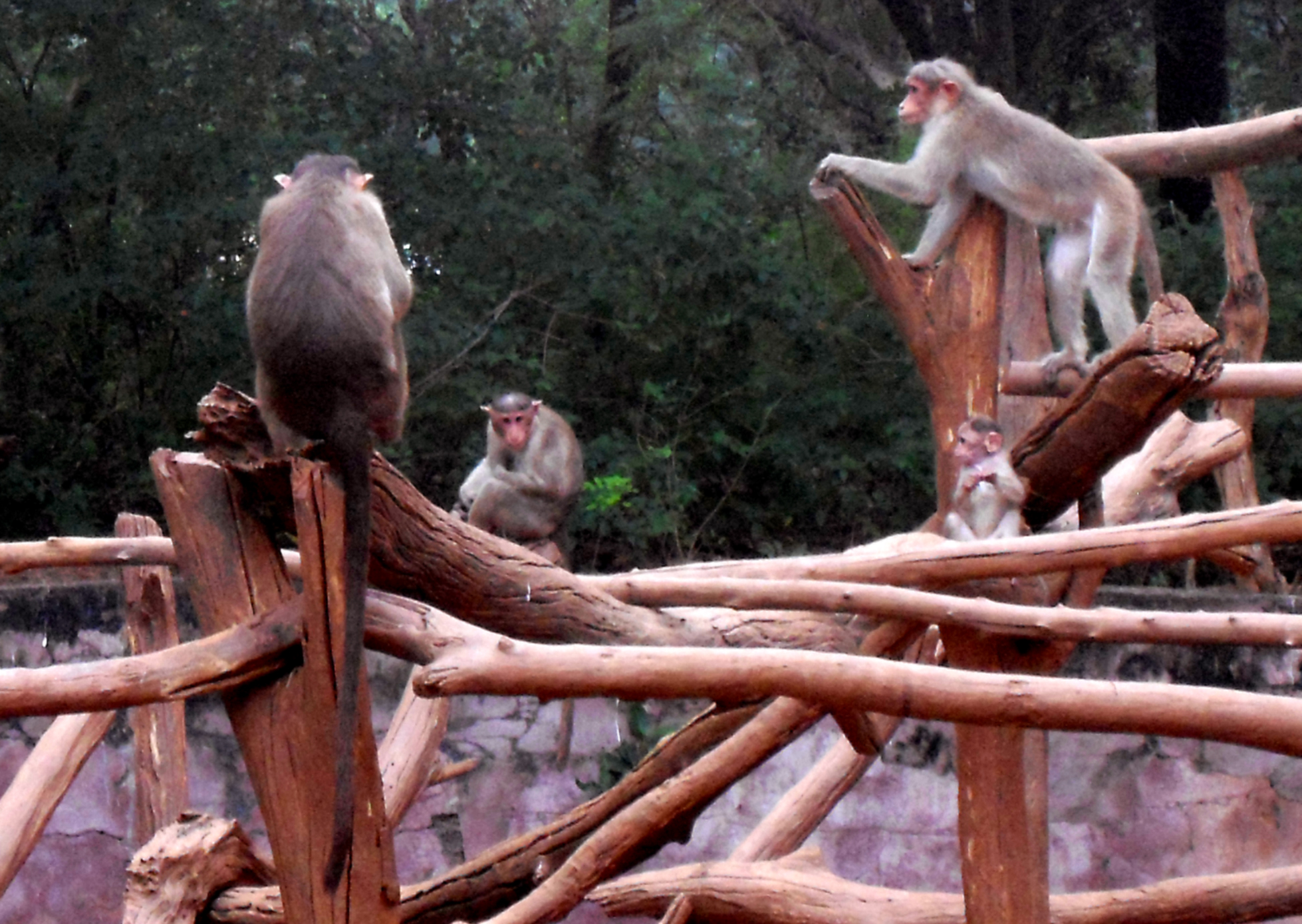
Bonnet macaque

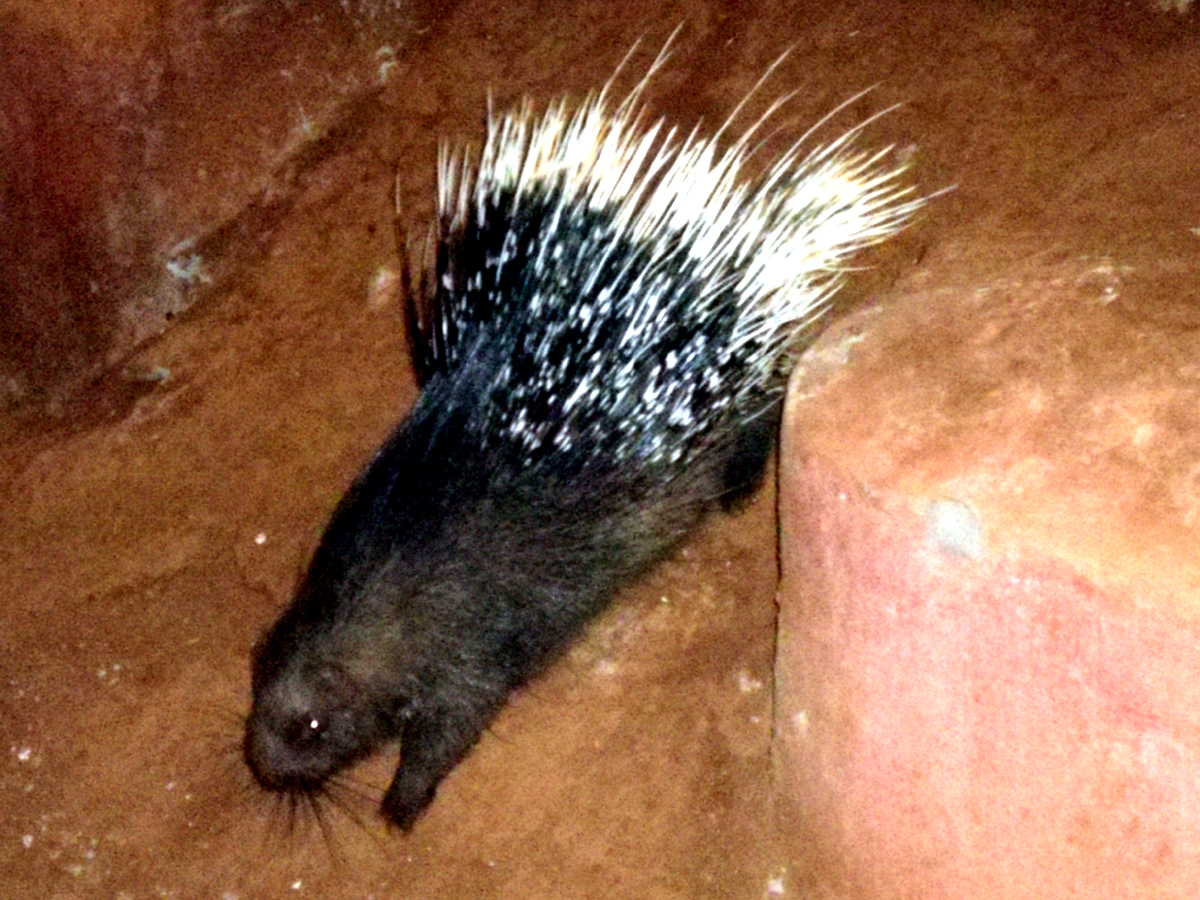
Indian crested porcupine

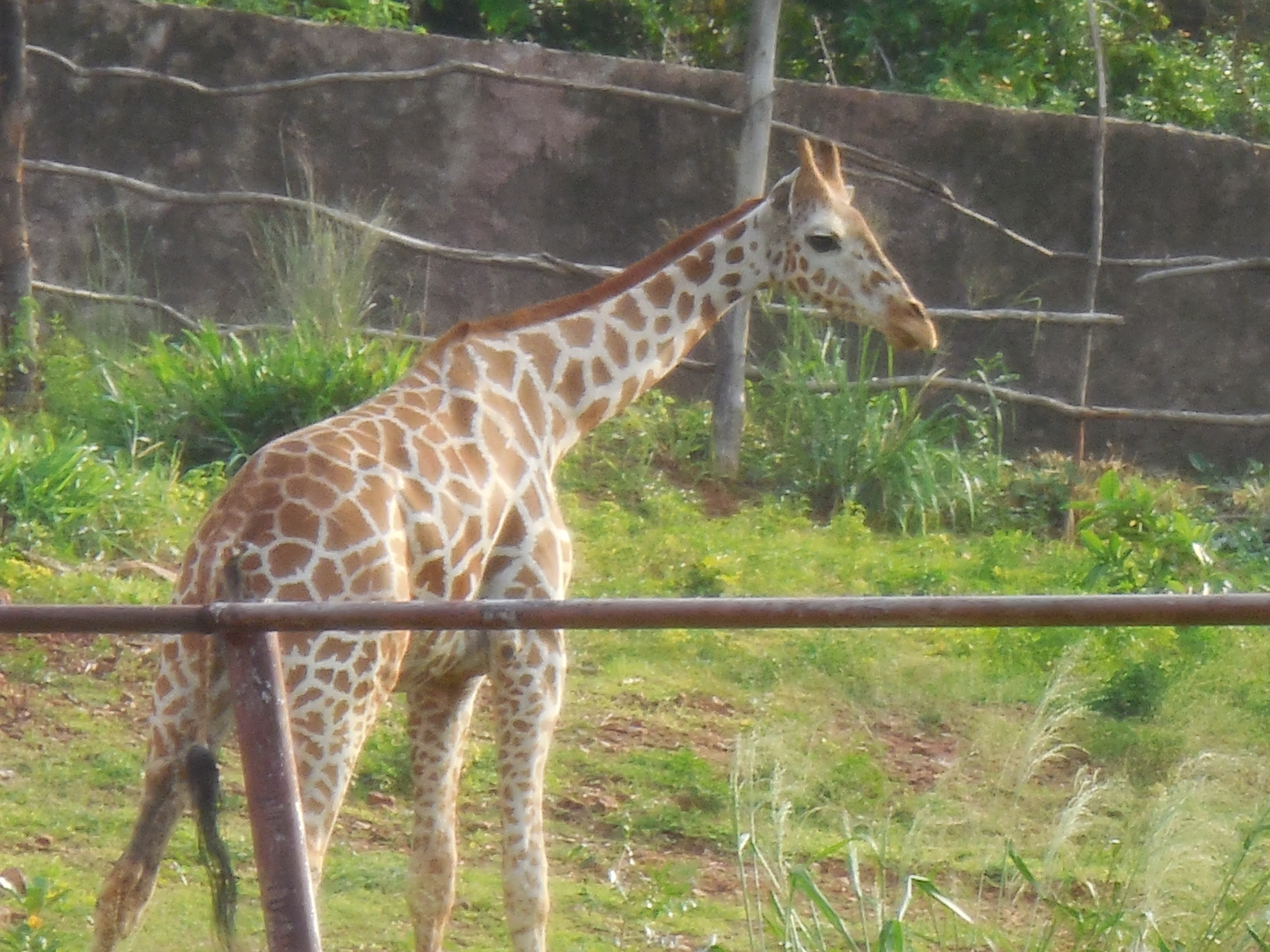
Giraffe

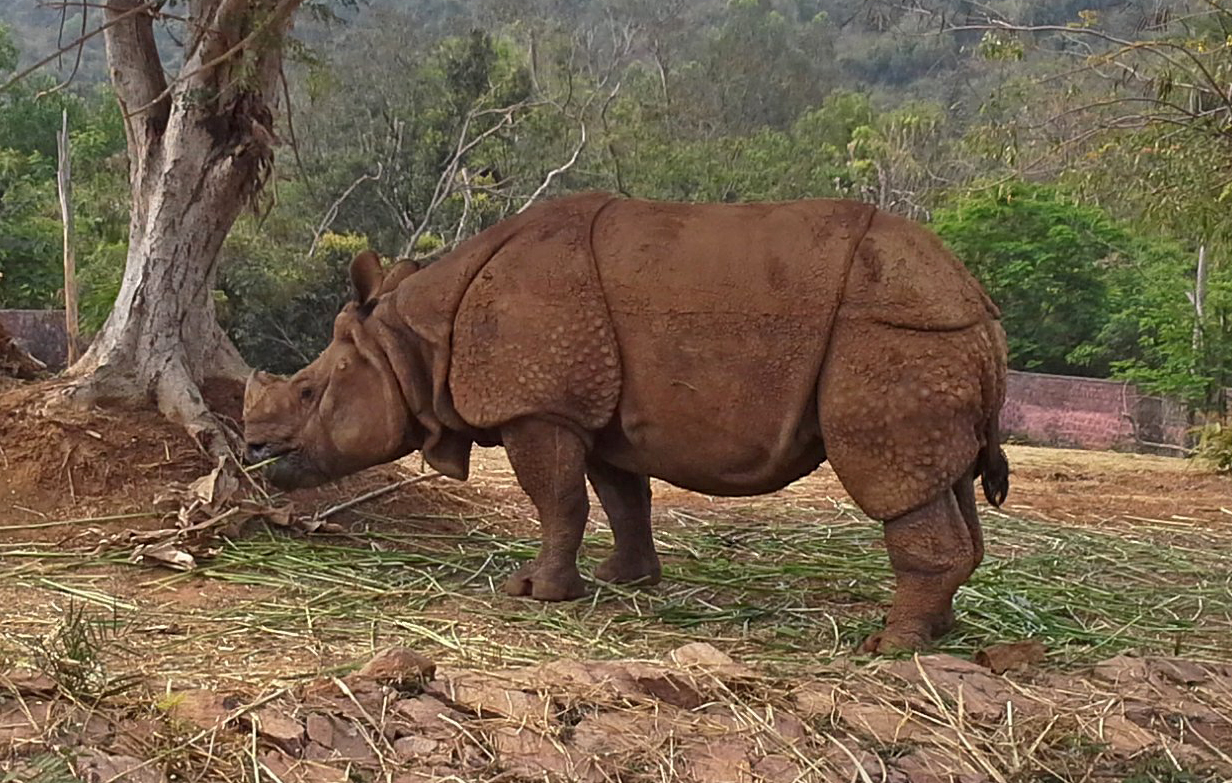
Indian rhinoceros

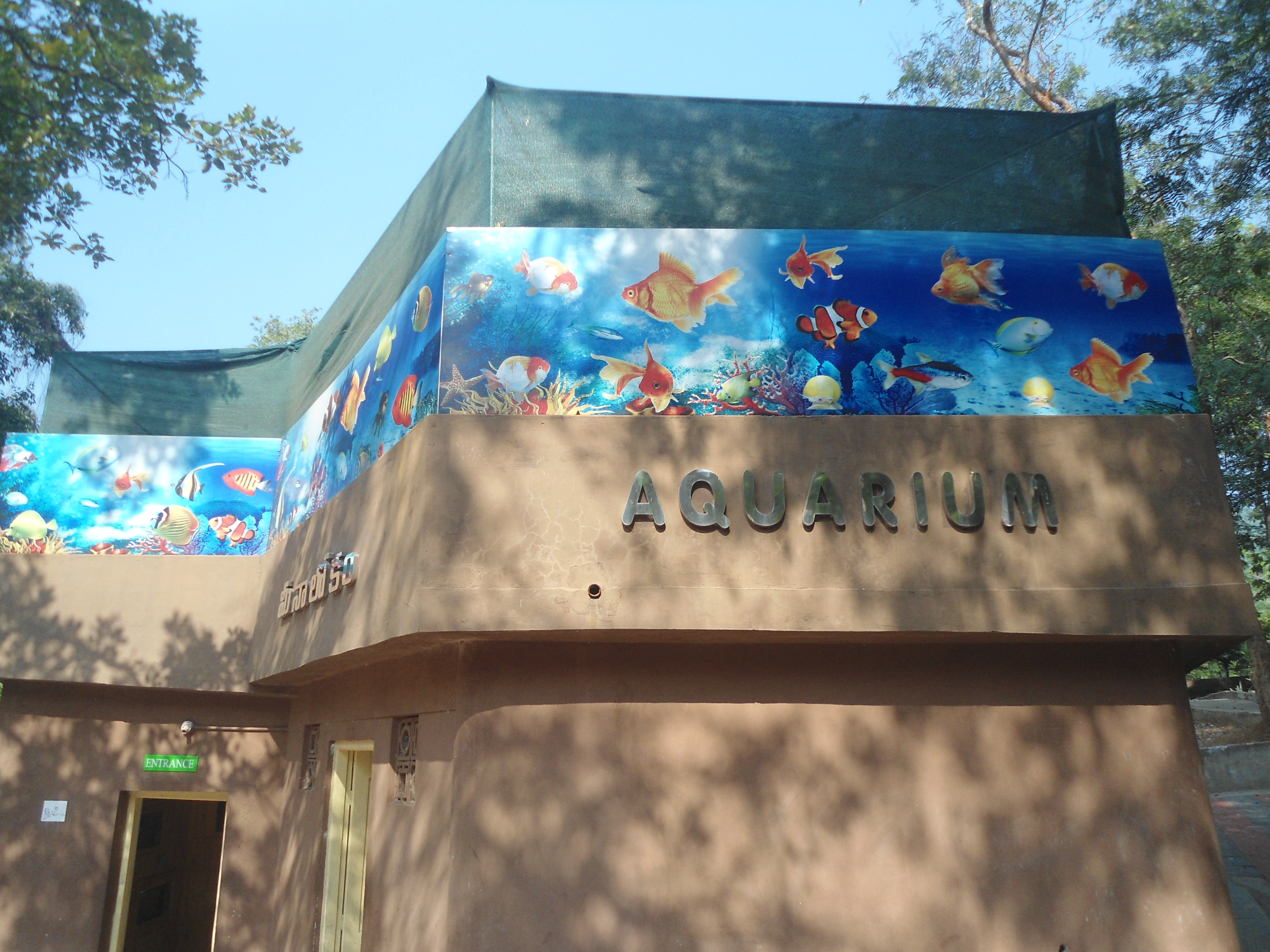
Meenalokam at Zoo Park

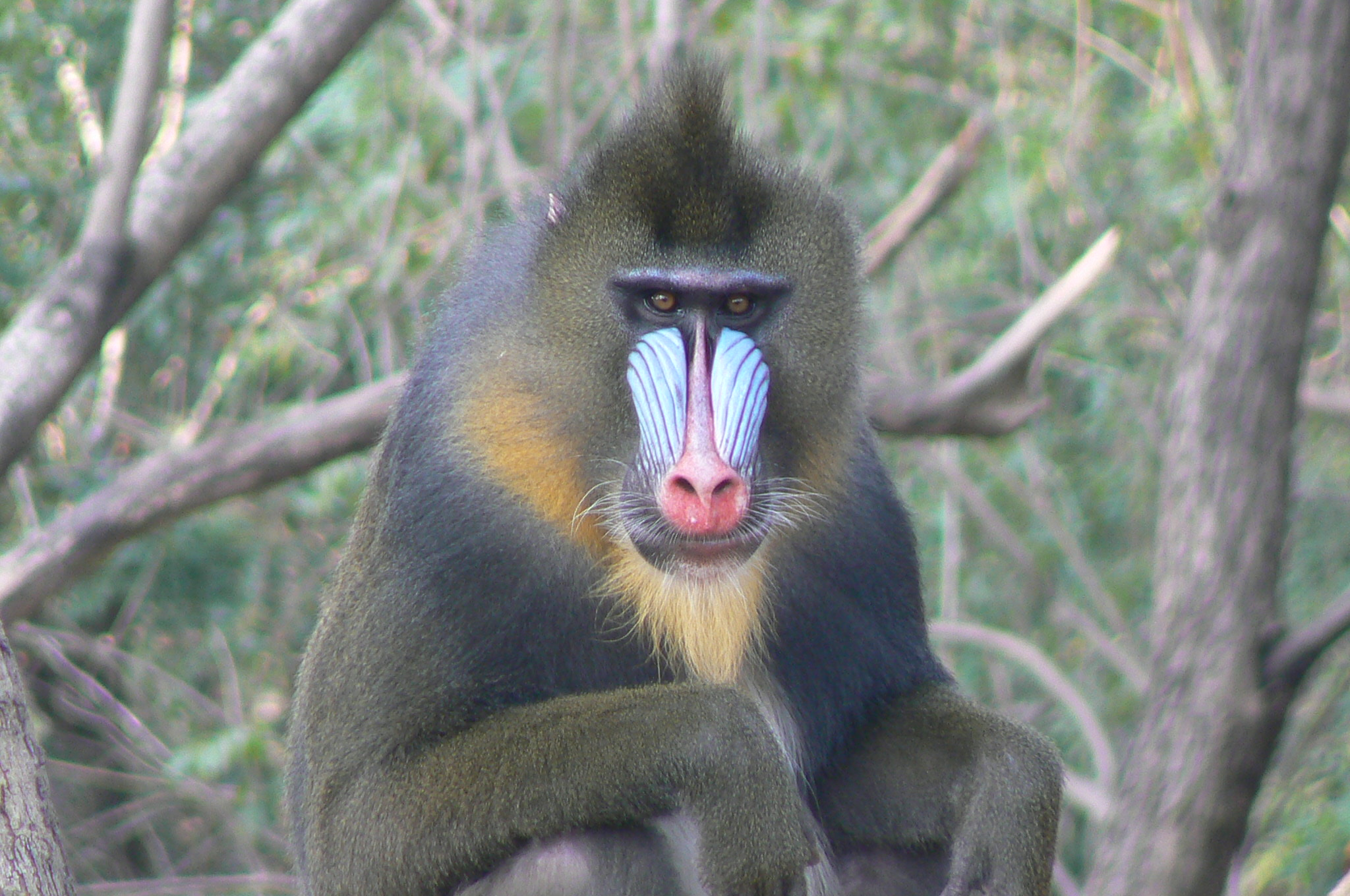
Mandrill

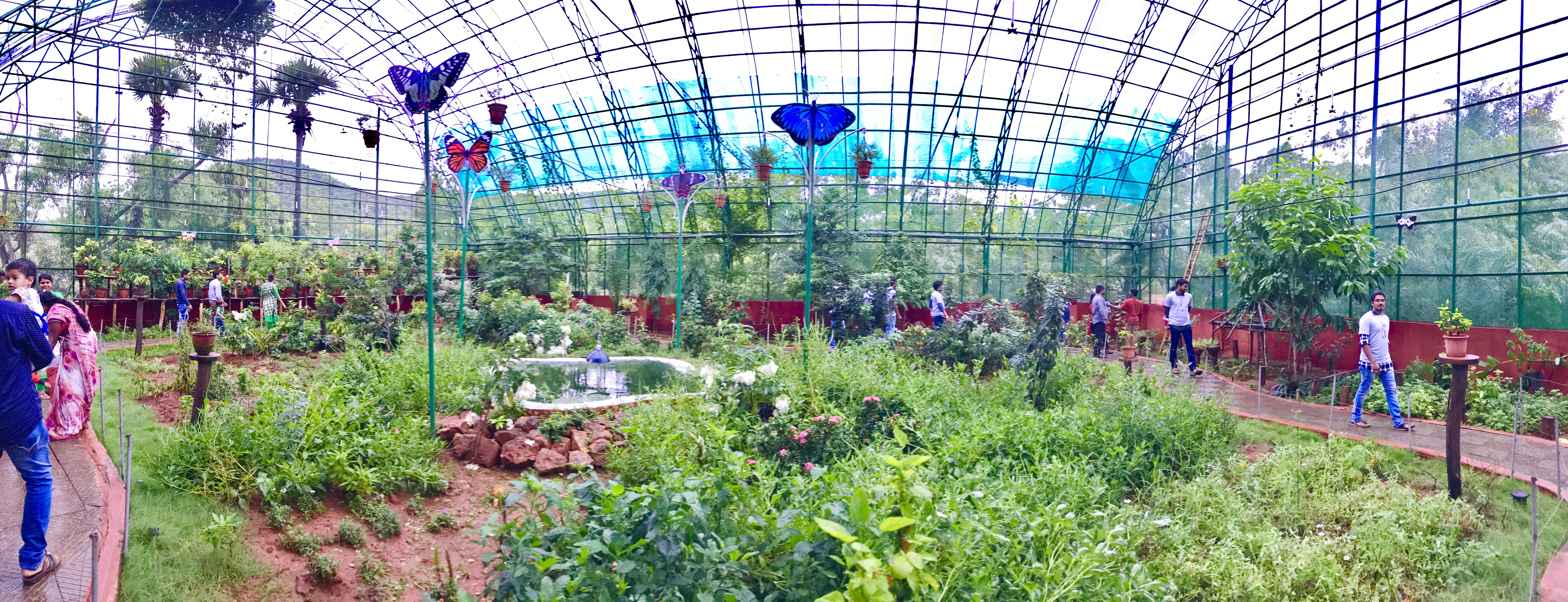
Inside Butterfly world

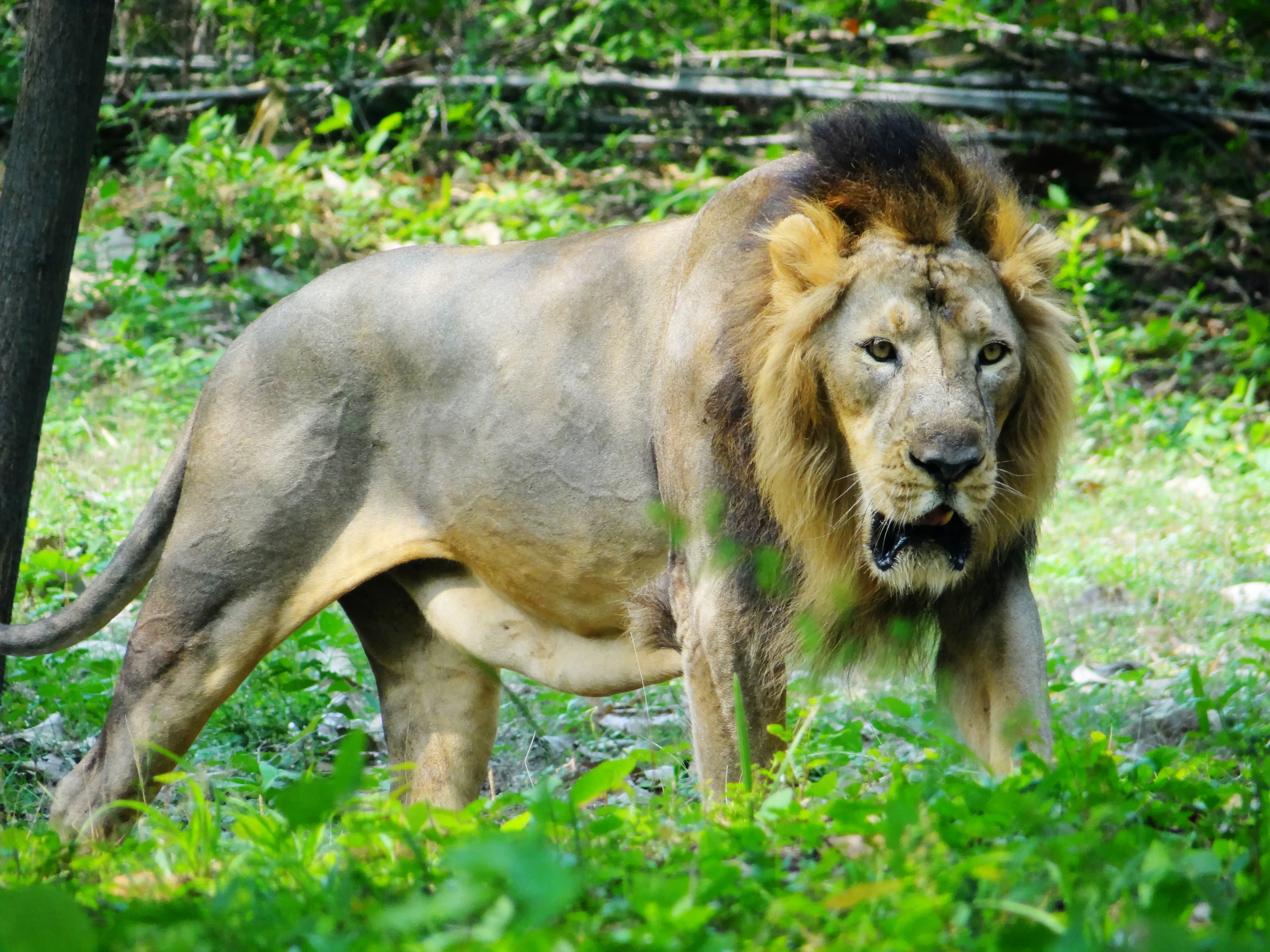
Asiatic lion

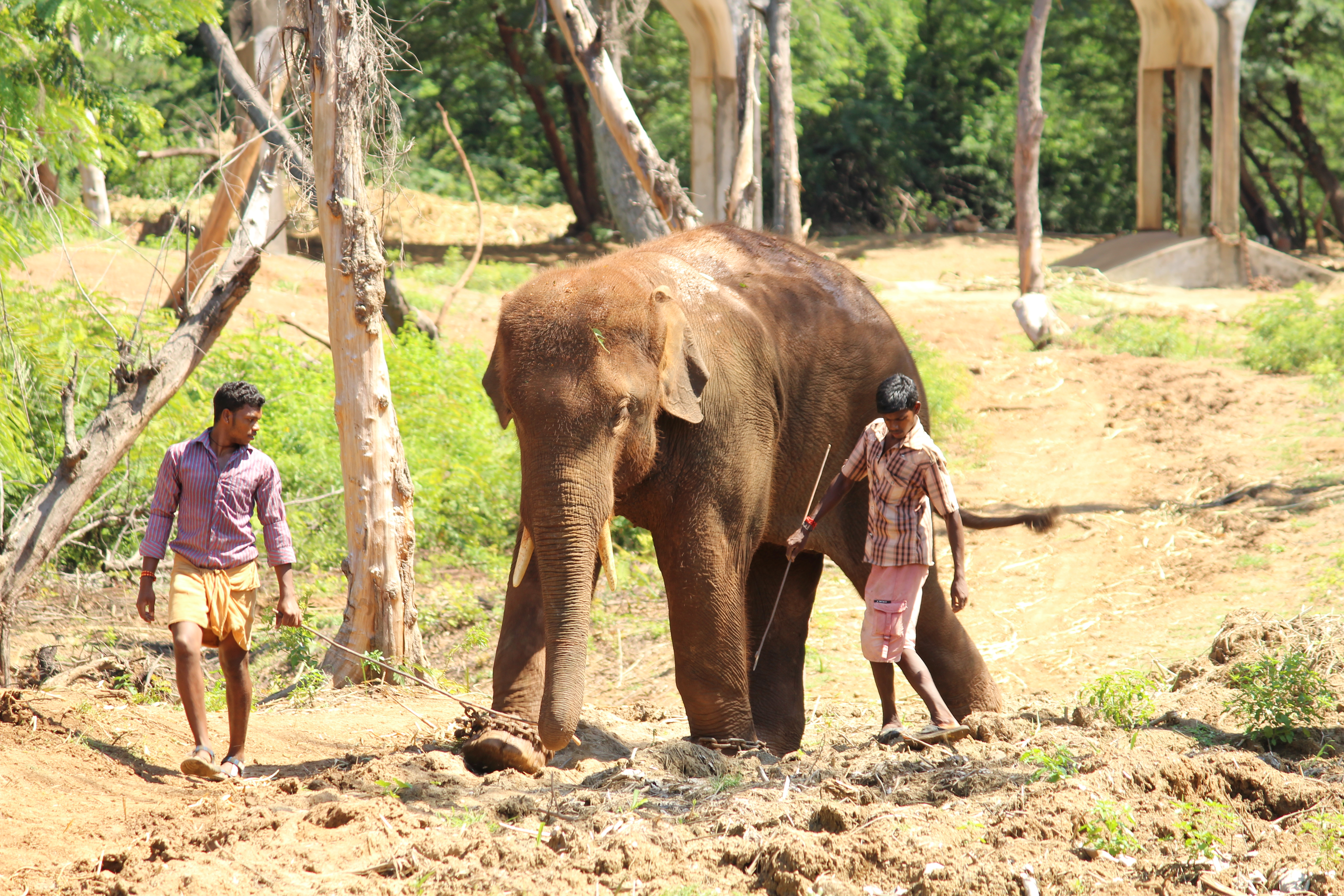
Indian elephant

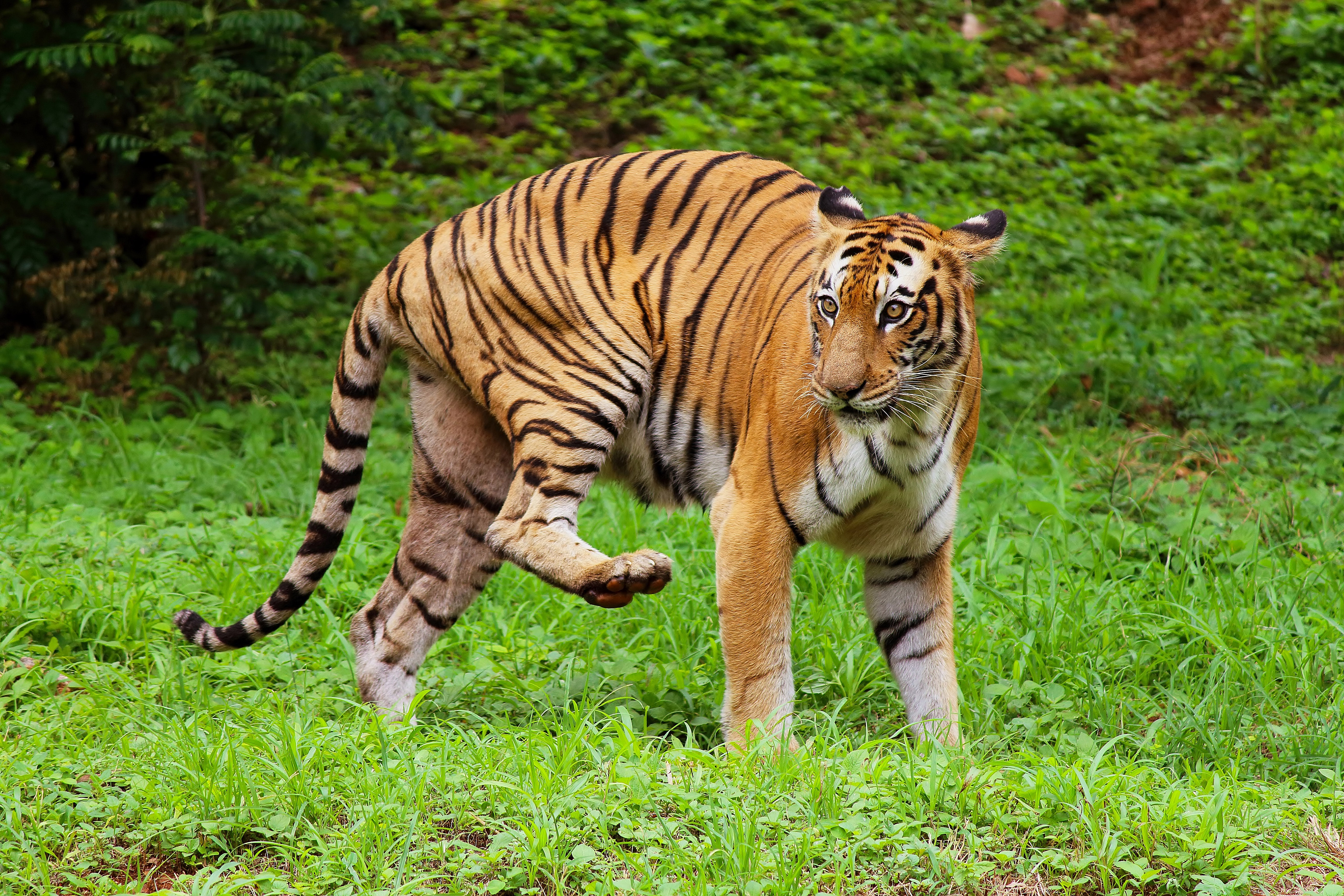
Royal Bengal iger
