= Eastern Ghats =

Mountain range along the eastern coast of India

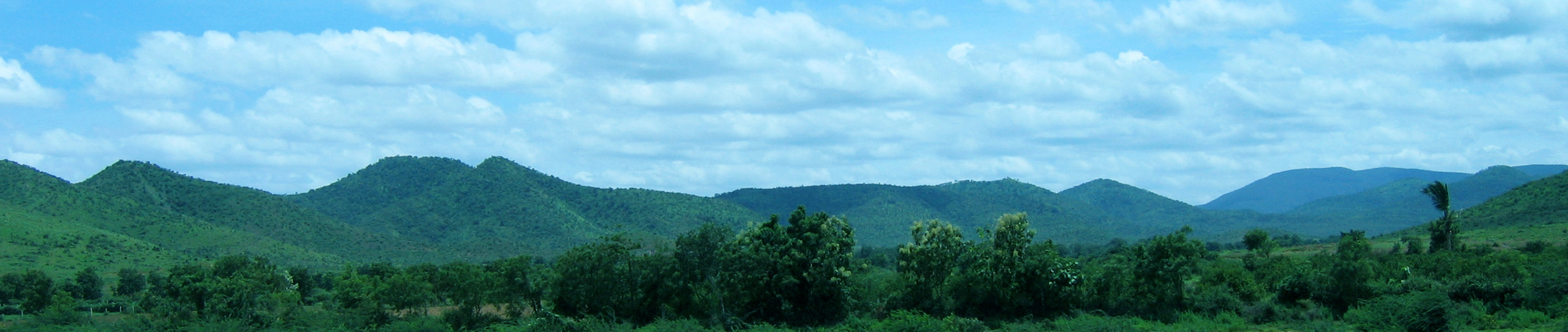
- Eastern Ghats at the Sri Venkateswara National Park near Talakona in Andhra Pradesh

Highest point
- Peak: Arma Konda, Andhra Pradesh
- Elevation: 1,680 m (5,510 ft)
- Coordinates: 18°13′41″N 82°43′23″E

Dimensions
- Length: 1,750 km (1,090 mi) N–S
- Width: 100–200 km (62–124 mi) E–W
- Area: 75,000 km^{2} (29,000 mi^{2})

Geography
- Country: India
- Regions: Eastern and Southern India
- States: Odisha; Andhra Pradesh; Tamil Nadu; Karnataka; Telangana
- Biome: Tropical forests and Wetlands

Geology
- Rock types: Charnockite; Granite; Khondalite; Metamorphic; Quartzite

The Eastern Ghats is a mountain range that stretches 1,750 km (1,090 mi) along the eastern coast of the Indian peninsula. Covering an area of 75,000 km^{2} (29,000 sq mi), it traverses the states of Odisha, Telangana, Andhra Pradesh, Karnataka, and Tamil Nadu. The range forms a discontinuous chain of mountains along the eastern edge of the Deccan Plateau, stretching from north of the Mahanadi River in Odisha to Vaigai River in Tamil Nadu at the southern end of the peninsula. The Eastern Ghats meet the Western Ghats at the Nilgiris. The average elevation is around 600 m (2,000 ft) and Arma Konda is the highest peak in the mountains at 1,680 m (5,510 ft).

Geological evidence indicates that the mountains were formed during the archeozoic era and became part of the Indian subcontinent post the break-up of the supercontinent of Rodinia and the formation of Gondwana. The mountains were formed through further metamorphism during the mid-Proterozoic era. The northern section of the range has an elevation ranging from 900–1,400 m (3,000–4,600 ft) and lies mostly in Odisha. The middle section stretches up to the Penna River and consists of two parallel ranges with an average elevation of 520 m (1,710 ft). At the southern end, the range is made up of several smaller hills.

The Eastern Ghats form a part of one of the major watersheds of India, consisting of many perennial river systems such as the Godavari, Krishna, Mahanadi and Kaveri. Because of the higher elevation of the Deccan Plateau on the west, most rivers originate from the Western Ghats and flow eastwards to cut across the range to the Bay of Bengal. As the mountains are discontinuous and have a lower elevation, they have a considerably lesser influence than the Western Ghats on the weather patterns in India. However, orography studies indicate that the range does play a role in bringing rainfall to the eastern coastal areas.

The weather is normally dry and humid with seasonal rainfall. There are nine different forest types found in the region including evergreen, deciduous and thorn forests. The Eastern Ghats region contains a large number of different species of flora and fauna, some of which are endemic to this region.

== Etymology ==
The name Eastern Ghats derives from the word ghat and the cardinal direction in which it is located with respect to the Indian mainland. Ghat, a term used in the Indian subcontinent, depending on the context, could either refer to a range of stepped hills such as the Western Ghats and Eastern Ghats, or a series of steps leading down to a body of water or wharf. As per linguist Thomas Burrow, the word Ghat was derived from similar words used in various Dravidian languages such as kattu (mountain side, ridge, or dam) in Tamil, katte (dam), gatta (mountain), and gatte (bank or shore) in Kannada, and katta (dam), and gattu (shore or embankment) in Telugu.

== Geology ==
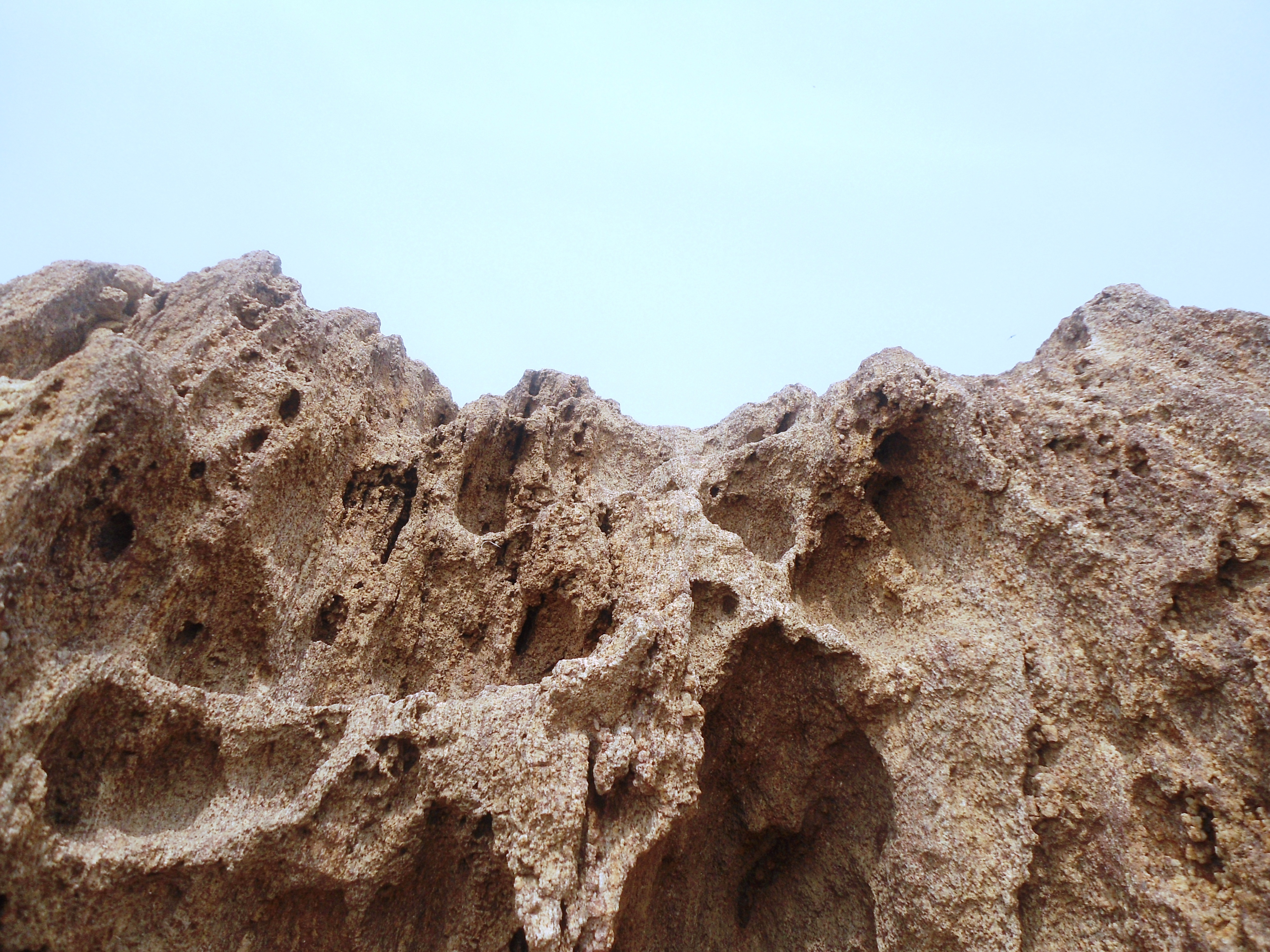
Khondalite is one of the major rock types found in the Eastern Ghats.

The Eastern Ghats are an ancient orogenic belt which started forming during the collision of crustal rocks during the archeozoic era. Geologic evidence indicates that these became part of the Indian subcontinent following the break-up of the super-continent of Rodinia and the creation of Gondwana. The mountains were formed over millions of years through metamorphism, and erosion and are significantly older than the Western Ghats. The rock layers were largely formed during the mid-proterozoic era by the accumulation of silt, carbonates and basalt which later became khondalite and calcium silicate rocks. The major rock types found are charnockite, granite, khondalite, metamorphic, and quartzite.

In the mesoproterozoic era, the range was compacted and re-aligned north-east. The structure includes multiple thrusts and strike-slip faults along its range. The Eparchaean Unconformity of the Tirumala Hills is a major discontinuity of stratigraphic significance that represents an extensive period of erosion and non-deposition, which is evident from the steep natural slopes, and ravines. Along the western edge, sedimentary rocks were deposited due to volcanic activity, which and later formed schist belts. The region consists of bauxite, iron ore and limestone reserves. The major soil types found are red, black, laterite, and alluvial.

== Geography ==
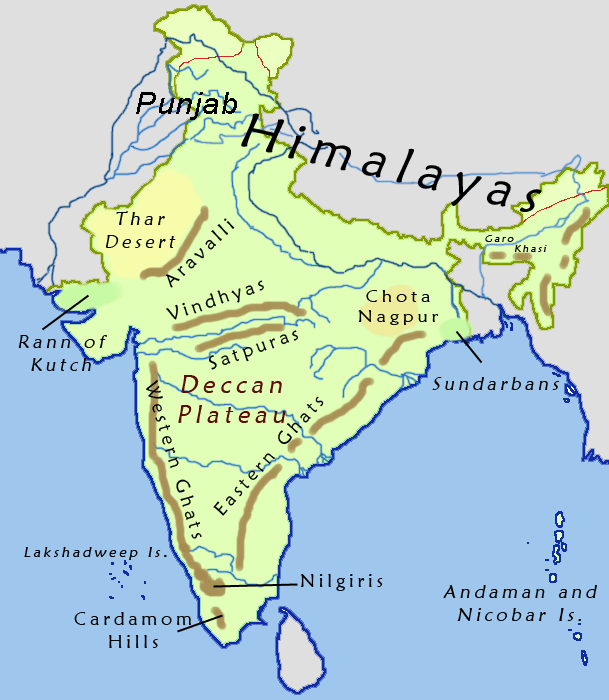
Mountain ranges of India, showing the Eastern Ghats

The Eastern Ghats extend from north of the Mahanadi River and run approximately 1,750 km (1,090 mi) to the Vaigai basin in the south of Indian peninsula. It covers an area of 75,000 km^{2} (29,000 sq mi), traversing across the Indian states of Odisha (25%), Telangana (5%), Andhra Pradesh (40%), Karnataka (5%), and Tamil Nadu (25%).

=== Topography ===
The Eastern Ghats form a discontinuous chain of mountains with an average elevation of 600 m (2,000 ft) and run parallel to the eastern coast of India along the Bay of Bengal. The Eastern coastal plains are the 100–130 km (62–81 mi) wide region between the Eastern Ghats and the Bay of Bengal. The average width of the mountains range from 100–200 km (62–124 mi) with the mountains wider in the north and narrower in the south. Arma Konda is the highest peak in the mountains at 1,680 m (5,510 ft).

The range can be roughly divided into three separate sections. The northern section of the range lies majorly in Odisha and stretches from the Similipal hills in the north to the Andhra Pradesh border. It has an elevation ranging from 900–1,400 m (3,000–4,600 ft) with the highest peak at Deomali (1672 m). The central section lies in Telangana and Andhra Pradesh and stretches up to the Penna River. It consists of two parallel ranges with an average elevation of 520 m (1,710 ft) and is separated by a 160 km (99 mi) wide gorge through which the rivers Godavari and Krishna flow. The hills continue as Javadi and Shevaroy Hills, south of Chennai and meet with the Western Ghats at Nilgiris. The Biligiriranga and Male Mahadeshwara Hills in Karnataka extend to Talamalai in Tamil Nadu, and is separated from the Western Ghats meet by the Moyar River valley. Sirumalai hills is the southern end of the Eastern Ghats which is located in the Dindigul district of Tamilnadu which is considerably a major hill range. and beyond Sirumalai hills, only hillocks are present sparsely. The last of such hillock on the eastern ghats side is the Vallanadu Hillock which is located in the Tuticorin district of Tamilnadu, which is about 200 kilometres south of Sirumalai hills. From Vallanadu Hillock, Cape Comorin is around 100 kilometres, beyond which the Indian Ocean and Continental shelf exist.

Hill ranges of Eastern Ghats
Section	State	Range	District
North	Odisha	Similipal	Mayurbhanj
North	Odisha	Garhjat	Bargarh, Jharsuguda, Kendujhar, Sambalpur, Subarnapur, Sundergarh
North	Odisha	Gandhamardan	Balangir, Bargarh, Sambalpur
North	Odisha	Kandhamal	Kalahandi, Phulbani
North	Odisha	Niyamgiri	Kalahandi, Rayagada
North	Odisha	Deomali	Koraput
North	Odisha	Mahendragiri	Gajapati
Central	Andhra Pradesh; Telangana		
Central	Andhra Pradesh; Telangana	Palakonda, Antikonda, Burrakonda, Pathapatnam, Mandasa, Sompeta	Parvathipuram, Srikakulam
Central	Andhra Pradesh; Telangana	Salur, Peddakonda, Duggeru, Gurupam, Kalikonda, Sunkarimetta, Madgole–Anantagiri, Chintapalli–Sapparla–Gudem–Marripakala	Alluri, Parvathipuram, Visakhapatnam, Vizianagaram
Central	Andhra Pradesh; Telangana	Gurthedu, Addateegala, Rampachodavaram, Maredumili, Bison Hills	Alluri, East Godavari
Central	Andhra Pradesh; Telangana	Polavaram, Papikonda	Alluri, Eluru, West Godavari
Central	Andhra Pradesh; Telangana	Kondapalli	Krishna
Central	Andhra Pradesh; Telangana	Kondaveedu	Palnadu
Central	Andhra Pradesh; Telangana	Nallamala	Guntur, Kurnool, Nagarkurnool, Nalgonda, Prakasam, Wanaparthy
Central	Andhra Pradesh; Telangana	Yerramala, Palakonda	Kadapa
Central	Andhra Pradesh; Telangana	Veligonda	Nellore
Central	Andhra Pradesh; Telangana	Seshachalam, Lankamala, Nagari, Kambakkam	Chittoor, Kadapa, Tirupati
South	Karnataka; Tamil Nadu	Biligiriranga, Male Mahadeshwara Hills	Chamarajanagar
South	Karnataka; Tamil Nadu	Kambakkam	Vellore
South	Karnataka; Tamil Nadu	Javadi	Tirupathur, Tiruvannamalai, Vellore
South	Karnataka; Tamil Nadu	Gingee	Viluppuram
South	Karnataka; Tamil Nadu	Servarayan, Kalrayan	Salem
South	Karnataka; Tamil Nadu	Kollimalai, Bodhamalai, Nainamalai	Namakkal
South	Karnataka; Tamil Nadu	Chitteri	Dharmapuri
South	Karnataka; Tamil Nadu	Melagiri	Dharmapuri, Krishnagiri
South	Karnataka; Tamil Nadu	Pachaimalai	Tiruchirappalli

=== Hydrology ===
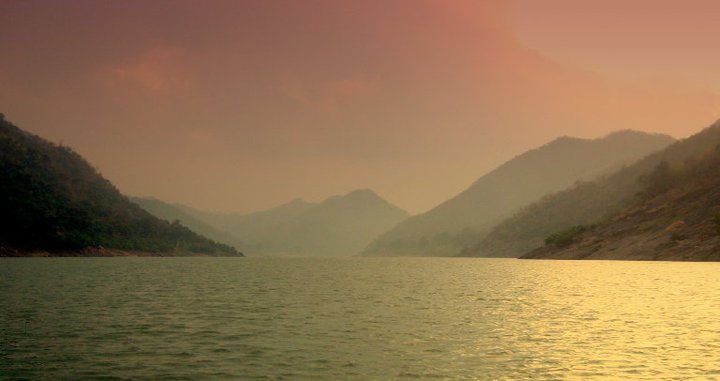
Godavari is the largest river in the region and cuts through the range.

The Eastern Ghats form one of the major watersheds of India with major river systems such as Godavari, Kaveri, Krishna and Mahanadi cutting across the range. Most rivers flow eastwards towards the Bay of Bengal owing to the steeper gradient moving from east to west. The Eastern Ghats are the source for many small and medium rivers of the east coastal plains.

Minor rivers of the Eastern Ghats
Riparian state	Rivers
Odisha	Baitarani, Brahmani, Budhabalanga, Nagavali, Rushikulya, Sabari, Subarnarekha, Vamsadhara
Andhra Pradesh	Champavathi, Chitravathi, Gosthani, Gundlakamma, Kundu, Penna, Sarada, Sileru, Swarnamukhi, Tammileru
Tamil Nadu	Amaravathi, Palar, Ponnaiyar, Swetha, Thamirabharani, Varaha, Vaigai, Vellar

The streams and rivers give rise to numerous waterfalls in the region. The region also consists of many wetlands and large coastal lagoons such as the Chilika, Kolleru and Pulicat lakes. The rivers have been dammed for hydroelectric and irrigation purposes, with major reservoirs spread across the region.

== Climate ==
Climatic zones in India

As the mountains are discontinuous and have a lower elevation, they have a considerably lesser influence than the Western Ghats on the weather patterns in India. However, orography studies indicate that the range does play a role in rainfall patterns along the coast. The range blocks winds at the low level which brings rainfall to the eastern coastal plains. The Eastern Ghats region has a tropical climate and receives rainfall from the monsoon. It is hot in the summers with temperatures reaching 44 °C (111 °F) during summer with humidity levels of 65–75%. The northern region receives 120–150 cm (47–59 in) of rainfall and the lower regions receive 60–110 cm (24–43 in) of rain. The temperature is lowest in the winter month of January with an average of 20–25 °C (68–77 °F). The higher hill ranges are generally wetter and cooler with the lower parts remaining semi-arid and dry. The coastal regions experience tropical cyclones during the monsoon season.

== Bio-diversity ==
=== Flora ===
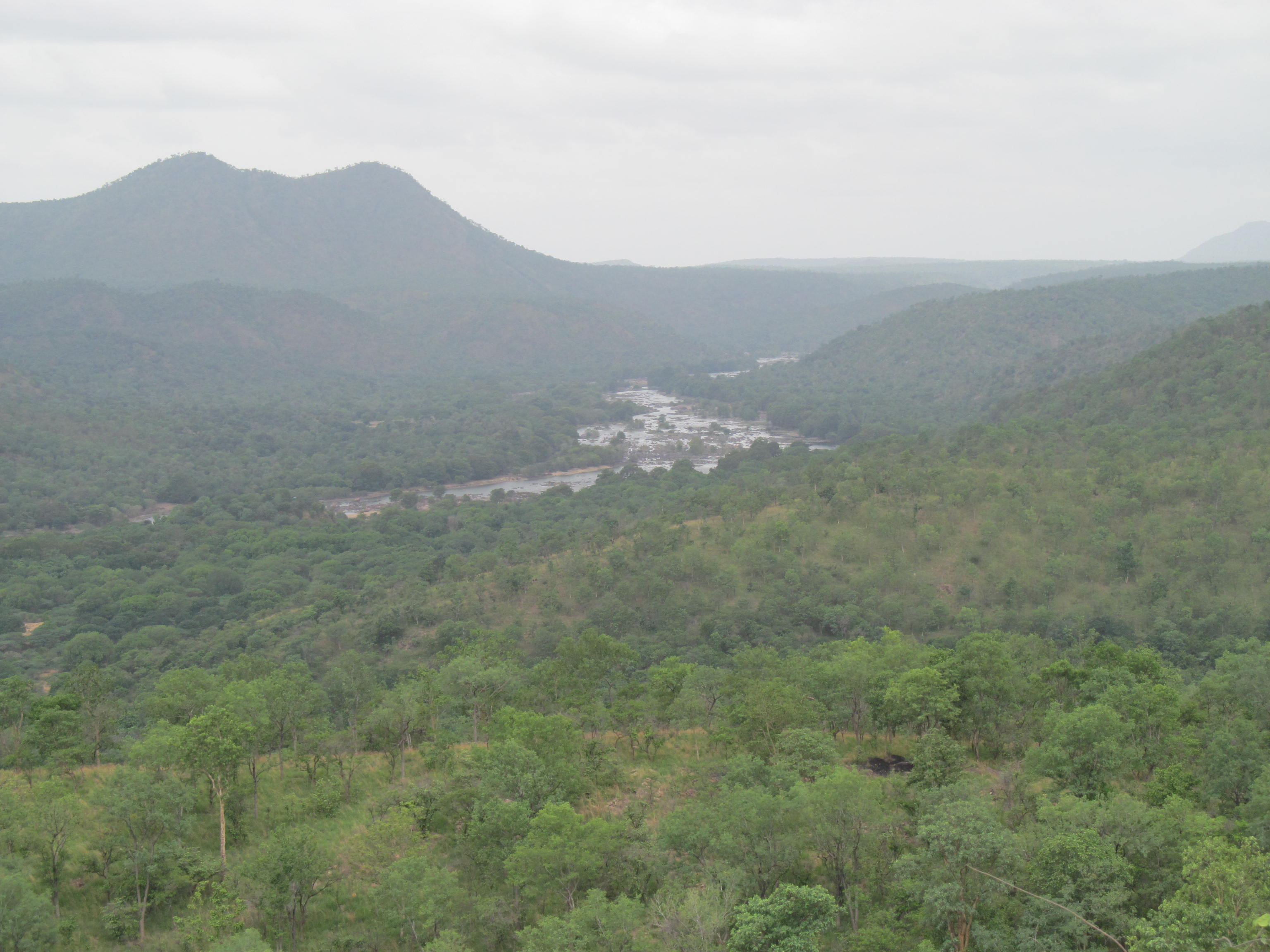
Dry deciduous forests are common across the region.

There are nine forest types in the Eastern Ghats region, namely tropical evergreen, semi-evergreen, moist deciduous, riverine, southern dry deciduous, northern dry deciduous, dry savannah, thorn scrub, and dry evergreen forests. The vegetation varies considerably with altitude with scrubs and dry forests at lower altitudes and deciduous, semi-evergreen forests, and evergreen forests at higher altitudes. Tropical evergreen forests occur in small patches in Shevroy in Tamil Nadu and in north Andhra Pradesh. Semi-evergreen forests are found in the northern section and southern fringes. Moist deciduous forests occur in Odisha and Nallamala in Andhra Pradesh–Telangana. Dry deciduous, dry savannah and scrub forests occur across the range. Dry evergreen forests are limited to south Andhra Pradesh, and north Tamil Nadu.

The region is home to more than 4500 species of angiosperms, which account for 13% of the flowering plant species in India. About 166 species of flowering plants are endemic to the Eastern Ghats and more than ten new species have been discovered in the region since the early 2010s. About 184 species of ferns, and 190 species of orchids have been recorded in the region. Commercially viable tree species include Indian rosewood, teak, mahogany, and red sandalwood.

=== Fauna ===
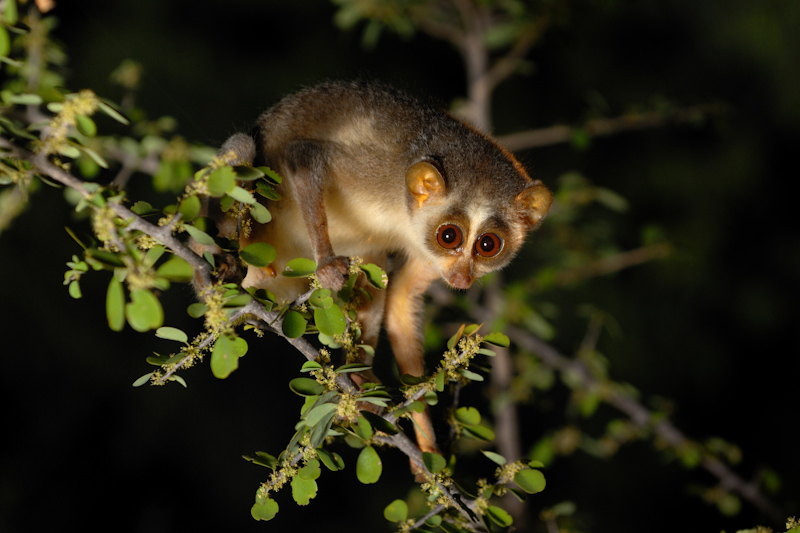
The grey slender loris is limited to South India and parts of Sri Lanka.

Bio-diversity of Eastern Ghats
Group	Species in Eastern Ghats	Species in India
Mammals	100	250
Birds	425	1224
Reptiles	99	197
Amphibians	100	408
Fishes	155	2546

Mammals found in the region include the Bengal tiger, leopard, sloth bear, Indian wild dog, golden jackal, Indian fox, and other cat species such as jungle cat, fishing cat, and leopard cat. Large herbivores include Indian elephant, blackbuck, sambar deer, spotted deer, barking deer, Indian gazelle, four-horned antelope, Indian bison, wild boar, Indian crested porcupine, mouse deer, and nilgai. Other smaller mammals include grey slender loris, Indian hare, Indian hedgehog, Indian mongoose, mole rat, smooth coated otter, Indian pangolin, palm civet, Indian giant flying squirrel, and Madras treeshrew. Bonnet macaque, rhesus macaque, and Hanuman langur are the major primates. The region is also home to more than 15 species of bats.

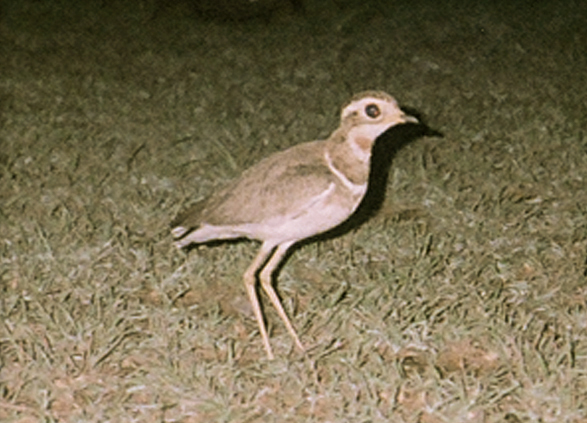
The Jerdon's courser was thought to be extinct in the wild before it was re-discovered in the range in 1986.

Bird surveys have found about 425 species belonging to 57 families in the region. Four species of hornbills are found in the region and are considered keystone species. The Jerdon's courser was thought to be extinct in the wild before it was re-discovered in the range in 1986. More than 50% of the wild population of the critically endangered Indian bustard is found in the region. Common and widespread species include the red-vented bulbul, white-browed bulbul, red-whiskered bulbul, common iora, and purple-rumped sunbird. Five species of birds that are endemic to the Western Ghats region have been sighted in the fringes of the Eastern Ghats. These include grey-headed bulbul, Nilgiri wood pigeon, Malabar parakeet, crimson-backed sunbird, and rufous babbler. Other species of avifauna include laughing dove, Indian nightjar, jungle owlet, red avadavat, Malayan night heron, striated heron, white-naped woodpecker, savanna nightjar, brown hawk-owl, Nilgiri flowerpecker, spot-bellied eagle-owl, blue-eared kingfisher, green imperial pigeon, oriental dwarf kingfisher, Indian swiftlet, and white-browed fantail. Raptors included white-eyed buzzard, grey-headed fish eagle, lesser fish eagle. Two species of critically endangered vultures – Indian vulture and red-headed vulture have been reported in the region.

There are about 99 reptile species found in the region. These include Indian monitor lizard, and endemic species such as Yercaud slender gecko, burrowing limbless skink, spotted Eastern Ghats skink, and Madras spotted skink. The Indian golden gecko, and Jeypore ground gecko were rediscovered in 1986 and 2010 respectively. Other reptiles include geckos, skinks, lacertas, iguanas, chameleons, and monitors. Snakes include blind snakes, shield-tailed snakes, sand boas, cobras, vipers, kraits, coral snakes, and python. There are about 100 species of amphibians found in the region including toads, pond frogs, cricket frogs, bull frogs, burrowing frogs, balloon frogs, small-mouthed frogs, tree frogs, and golden-backed frogs. There are also about 155 species of freshwater fish from 28 families found across the waters in the region. Insects include nearly 150 species of butterflies and nine species of tarantulas amongst others.

=== Threats and conservation ===
A 2017 study indicated that the Eastern Ghats region has lost about 32,200 km^{2} (12,400 sq mi) forest cover between 1920 and 2015. Forests which occupied 43.5% of the land area reduced by nearly 16 percent. An estimated 7.92 percent of the forest area converted for agriculture and 3.80 percent to grasslands from 1920 to 2015. As of 2018, only 3.53 percent of the total area was declared as protected areas. The major threats included illegal logging, mining, grazing, agriculture, forest fires and tourism, poaching, and illegal tapping of forest resources which have resulted in deforestation and fragmentation of forests. Various natural disasters such as heavy rainfalls, extreme temperature, environmental changes, competition due to invasive species have been threats to the biodiversity in the region. The absence of pollinators have also had an effect on the natural regeneration of vegetation.

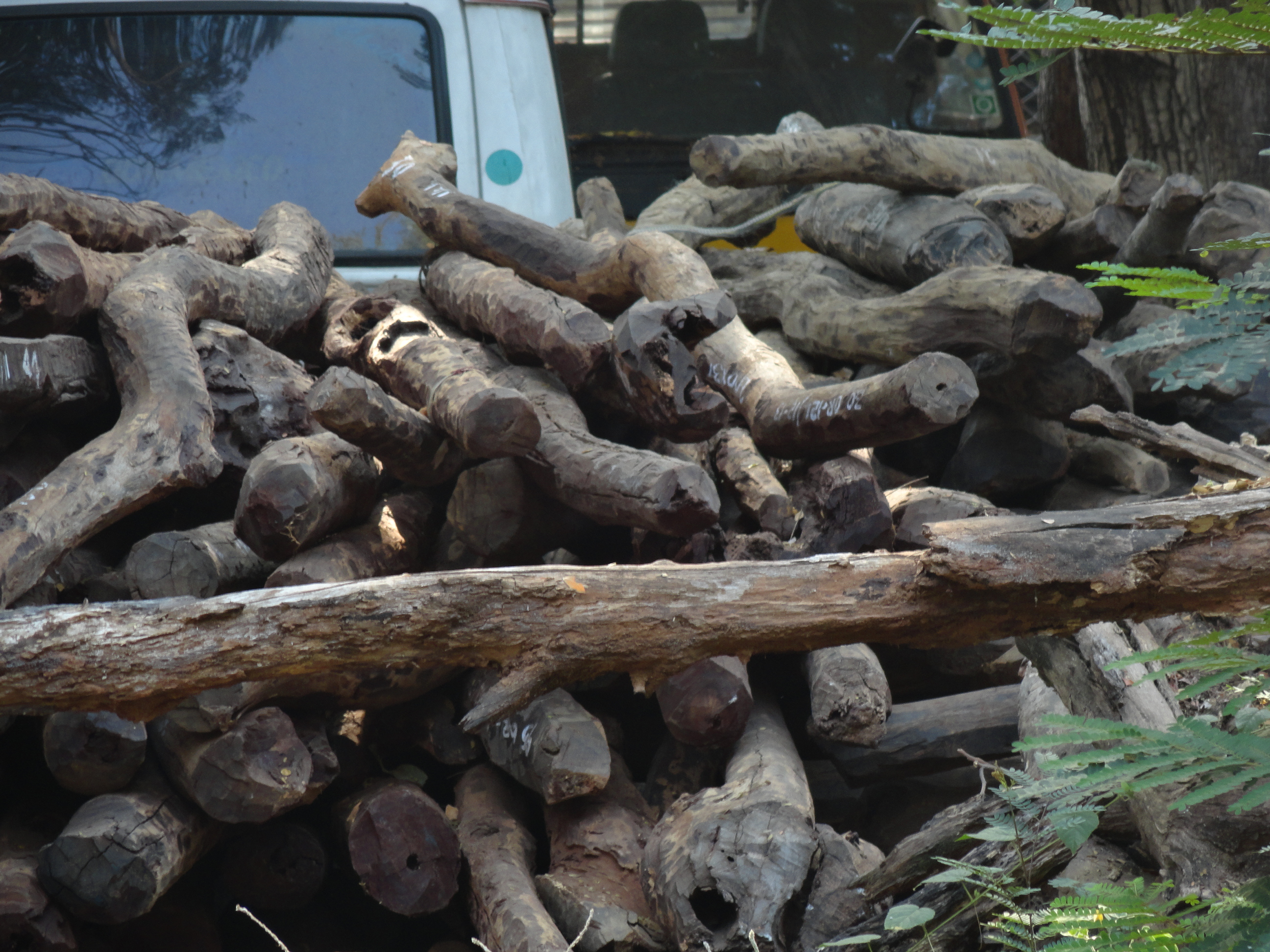
Seized illegally felled red sanders logs in Andhra Pradesh.

Till 1980, logging was a major contributor for the loss of forest cover with decrease in tree species such as teak, sal, red sanders, and sandalwood. Though laws in 1988 curtailed illegal logging, wood is still quarried by people for making charcoal, firewood, and construction. Forest produce is a source of income for people living in the fringes of the ranges. Over harvesting of forest produce for fodder, traditional medicine, and domestic uses along with unscientific extraction methods and burning of forests have been threats. The introduction of alien species either by deliberate or non deliberate means have resulted in competition to native species. The construction of large dams across rivers in the region have submerged more than 2,300 km^{2} (890 sq mi) of forest cover.

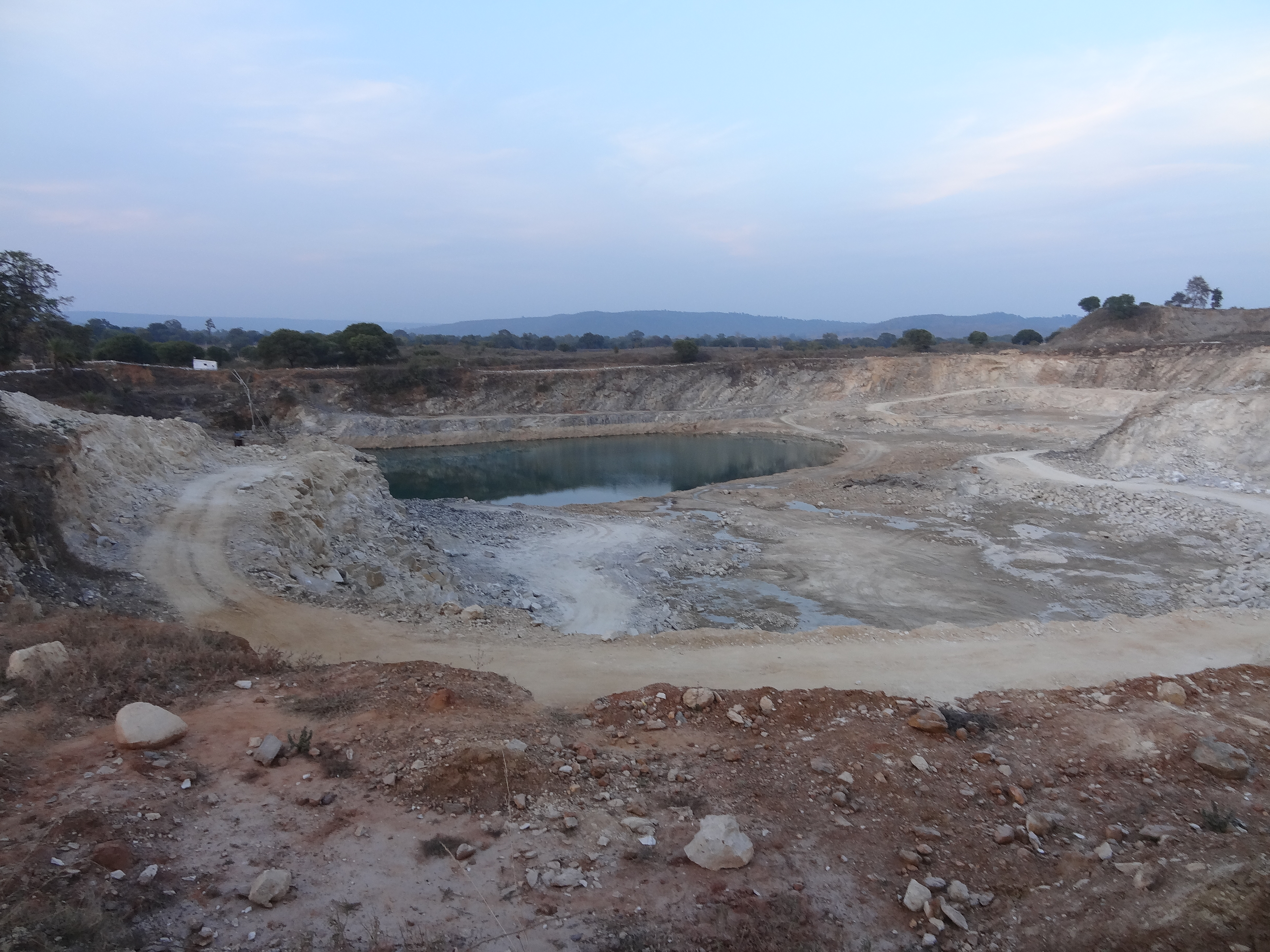
An abandoned mine in Odisha.

The Eastern Ghats region is rich in minerals and semi-precious stones. Illegal mining, poor mining processes, over exploitation, and unsafe disposal of debris have resulted in issues bio-degeneration of the areas. Eight of the 29 forest fire prone districts are located in the region and, Odisha and Andhra Pradesh recorded the most forest fires in 2014. With more than 90% of these fires caused by humans, this has resulted in loss of forest cover. Practices such as shifting cultivation, plantations, and illegal encroachments are the major agricultural contributors to deforestation. Increased urbanisation, and expansion of cities, construction of roads and railways, and tourism have led to encroachments into forest lands, and threats to bio-diversity in the region.

The Government of India had enacted various policies over the years to address the environmental concerns, access to forest resources, and protection of wildlife. Three national parks, two biosphere reserves, and 22 wildlife sanctuaries are present in the Eastern Ghats region. The protected areas include five tiger reserves under the Project Tiger, and an elephant reserve under the Project Elephant protection plans. About 13 eco-sensitive zones have been declared, which are jointly managed with the local communities.

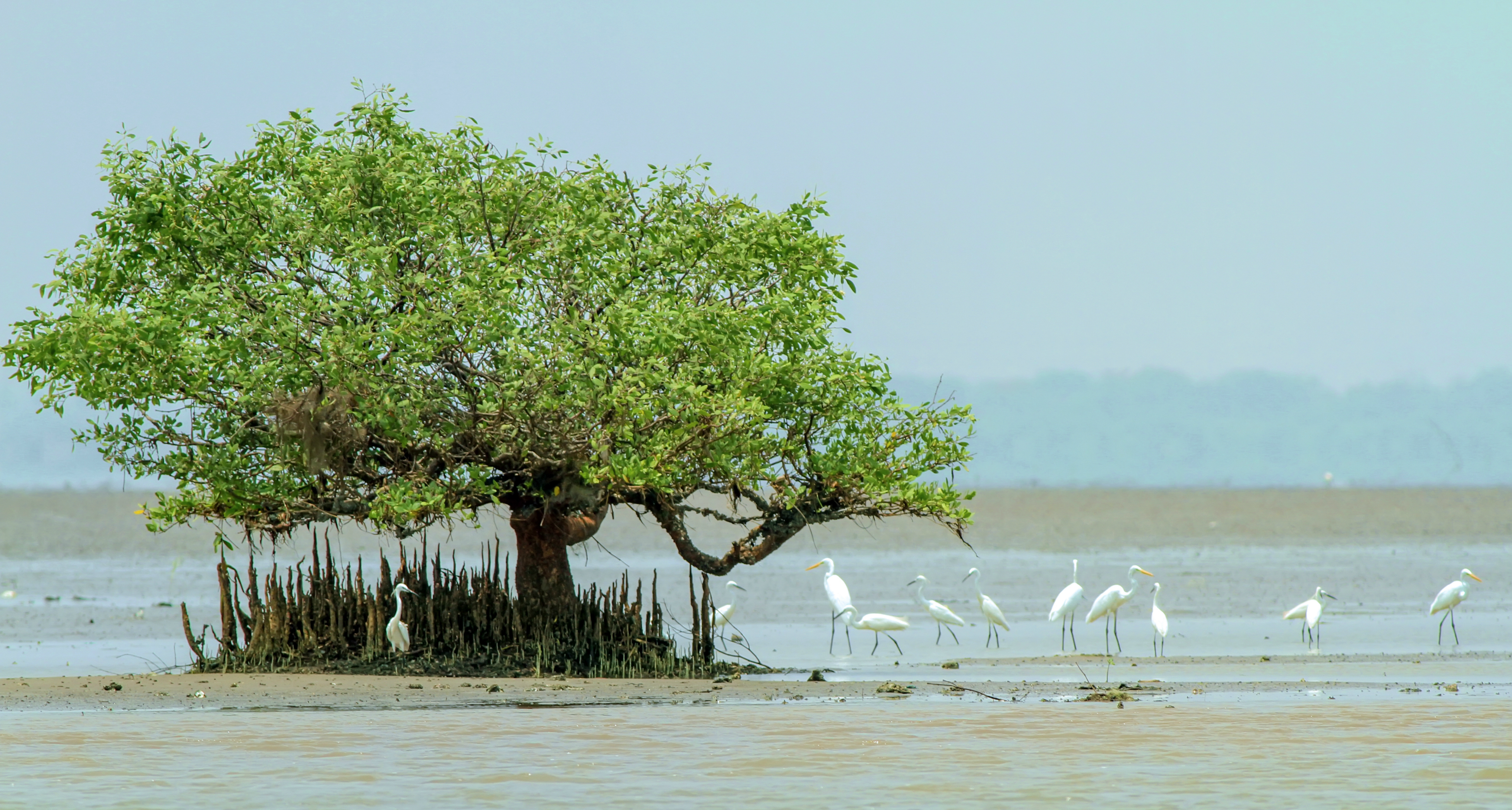
Birds at the Godavari River estuary at the Coringa Wildlife Sanctuary

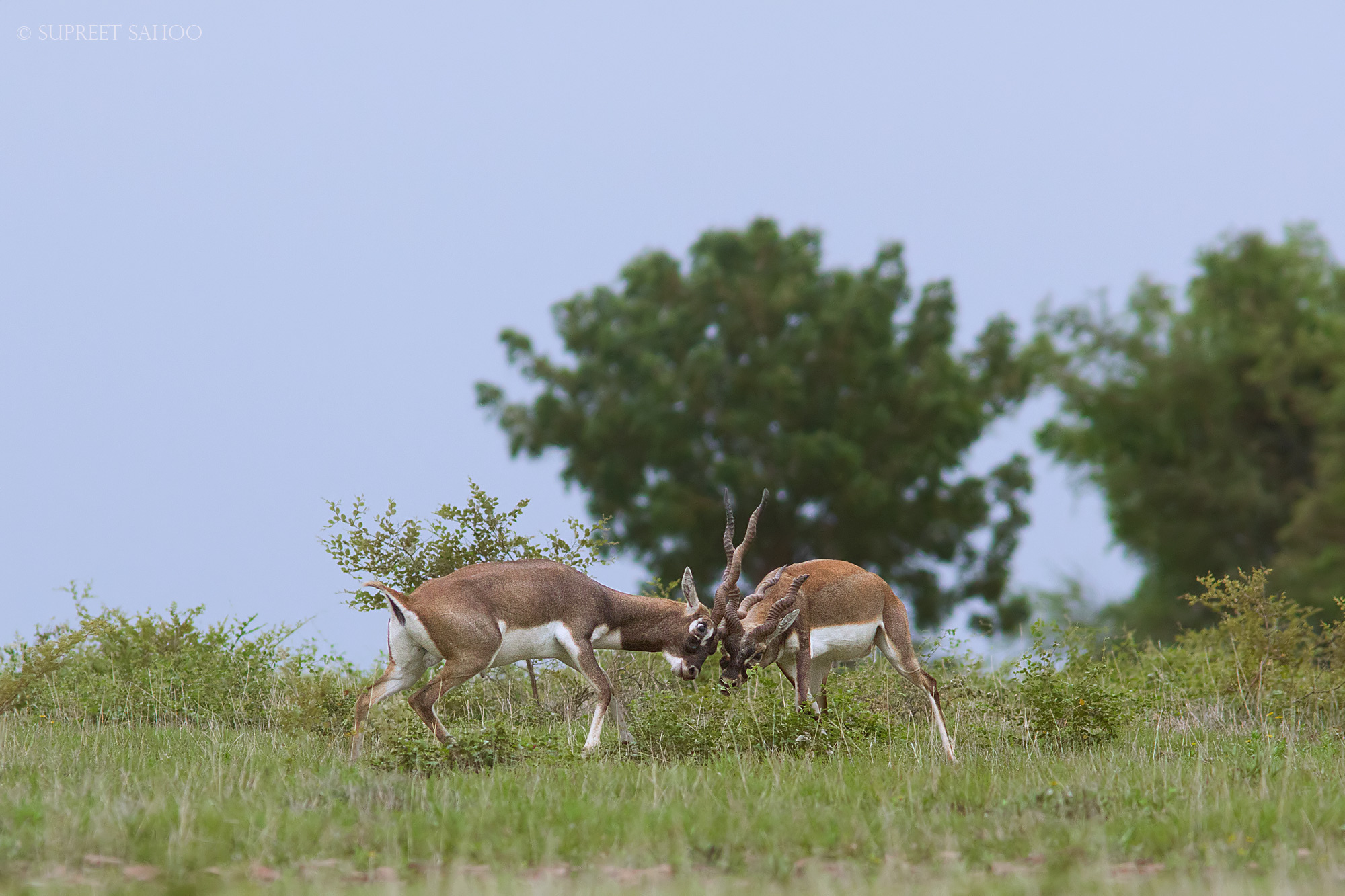
Blackbucks at the Rollapadu Wildlife Sanctuary

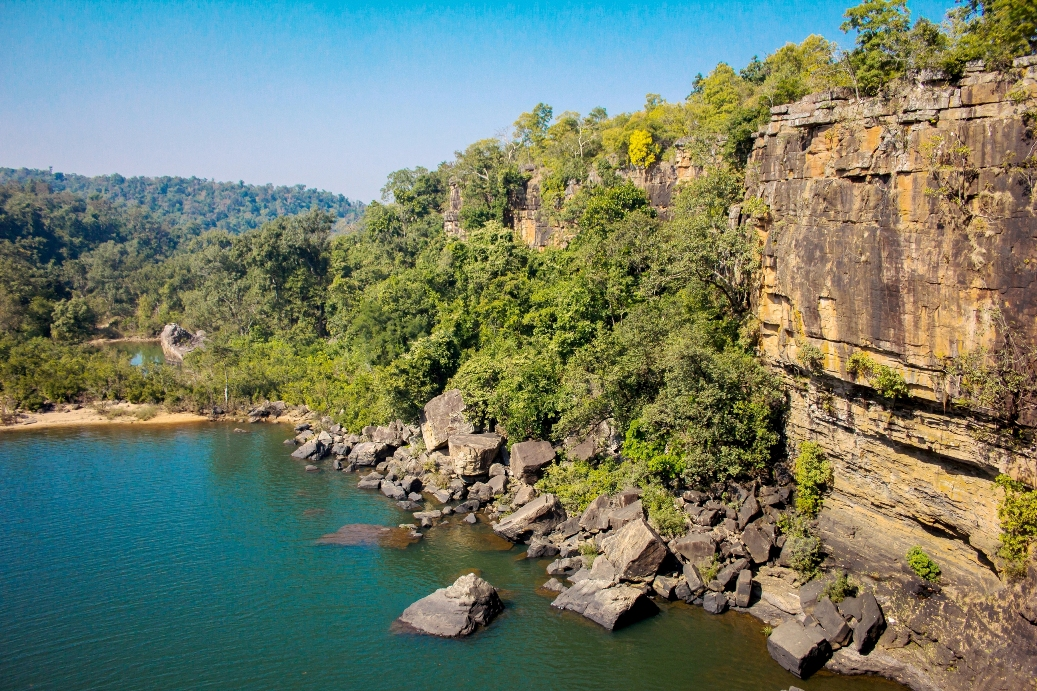
Sunabeda Wildlife Sanctuary

Protected areas
State	Protected area	Declared	Area (km^{2})	District
Odisha	Badrama Wildlife Sanctuary	1962	304.03	Sambalpur
Odisha	Hadgarh Wildlife Sanctuary	1978	191.06	Keonjhar, Mayurbhanj
Odisha	Karlapat Wildlife Sanctuary	1992	147.66	Kalahandi
Odisha	Khalasuni Wildlife Sanctuary	1982	116	Sambalpur
Odisha	Lakhari Valley Wildlife Sanctuary	1985	185.87	Gajapati
Odisha	Nalbana Bird Sanctuary	1987	15.53	Ganjam, Khurda, Puri
Odisha	Simlipal National Park	1979	1354.3	Mayurbhanj
Odisha	Sunabeda Wildlife Sanctuary	1988	500	Nuapada
Andhra Pradesh	Coringa Wildlife Sanctuary	1978	235.7	East Godavari
Andhra Pradesh	Gundla Brahmeswaram Wildlife Sanctuary	1990	1194	Kurnool, Prakasam
Andhra Pradesh	Kambalakonda Wildlife Sanctuary	2002	70	Visakhapatnam
Andhra Pradesh	Koundinya Wildlife Sanctuary	1990	356.7	Chittoor
Andhra Pradesh	Krishna Wildlife Sanctuary	1989	194.81	Guntur, Krishna
Andhra Pradesh	Nagarjunsagar-Srisailam Tiger Reserve	1978	3568.09	Alluri, Eluru
Andhra Pradesh	Papikonda National Park	1974	1012.86	Nandyal, Palnadu, Prakasam
Andhra Pradesh	Rollapadu Wildlife Sanctuary	1988	6.14	Nandyal
Andhra Pradesh	Sri Lankamalleswara Wildlife Sanctuary	1988	464.42	Kadapa
Andhra Pradesh	Sri Penusila Narasimha Wildlife Sanctuary	1997	1030.85	Nellore
Andhra Pradesh	Sri Venkateswara National Park	1985	153.32	Tirupati
Telangana	Kinnerasani Wildlife Sanctuary	1977	656	Khammam
Telangana	Amrabad Tiger Reserve	1983	2611.4	Nagarkurnool, Nalgonda
Karnataka	Biligiri Rangaswamy Temple Wildlife Sanctuary	1987	539.52	Chamarajanagar
Tamil Nadu	Vedanthangal Bird Sanctuary	1936	0.3	Chengalpattu
Tamil Nadu	Cauvery North Wildlife Sanctuary	2014	504.34	Dharmapuri, Krishnagiri
Tamil Nadu	Cauvery South Wildlife Sanctuary	2022	686.4	Dharmapuri, Krishnagiri

== See also ==
- Ghat Roads
