= Bodhamalai =

Highest point
- Elevation: 1,100 m (3,600 ft)
- Coordinates: 11°32′33″N 78°14′28″E

Dimensions
- Length: 19.3121 km (12.0000 mi) E-W
- Width: 9.3342 km (5.8000 mi) N-S
- Area: 180.2632 km^{2} (69.6000 mi^{2})

Naming
- Language of name: Tamil

Geography
- Location: Vennandur block, Rasipuram taluk
- Parent range: Eastern Ghats
- Biome: Forests

Bodhamalai or Bodamalai is a hill in Namakkal district of Tamil Nadu.

== Geography ==
Bodhamalai is an offshoot of Kolli Hills running 12 km in an east–west direction between Jarugu and Kolli Hills. The height ranges from 800 meters to 1200 meters.

Keelur, Melur, Gedamalai are some hill villages of Bodhamalai. Bodhamalai is a parts of Eastern ghats in Salem district and Namakkal district of Tamil Nadu. The Kolli hill is located forty kilometres south from Bodhamalai. The Yercaud or Shevaroy Hills of Salem district is located seventy kilometres north from Bodhamalai. The nearest town Rasipuram is located twenty kilometres South from Bodhamalai. Salem is located forty four kilometres north from Bodhamalai. The district capital Namakkal is located forty eight kilometres south from Bodhamalai. Mettala is located twenty one kilometres east from Bodhamalai. Vennandur is located thirty kilometres west from Bodhamalai. Here the hill tribes live very little. All of them are displaced from Kolli hill and live here. No bus facility. You have to go for a walk.

== Herbal plants ==
Several species of herbal plants grow in Bodhamalai. The local people sell herbal leaves, roots, tuber, stem, crust of herbal plant.

== Demographics ==
Tribals live in Kizhur, Mellur and Kedamalai hamlets. Agriculture and rearing live stocks is their main occupation.

== Administration ==
The area falls under the Rasipuram taluk and in the Rasipuram Assembly constituency in Namakkal district.
