= Barkudia =

Scientific classification
- Kingdom: Animalia
- Phylum: Chordata
- Class: Reptilia
- Order: Squamata
- Family: Scincidae
- Subfamily: Scincinae
- Genus: Barkudia; Annandale, 1917

Genus of lizards

Barkudia is a little-known genus of skinks endemic to India. These lizards are thought to be semi-fossorial, and living in coastal areas of the east coast of India. Almost nothing is known about the natural history of this genus, except for classical taxonomic texts.

There are two species:

- Barkudia insularis Annandale, 1917 — Madras spotted skink, distributed in the Circar Coast (type species)
- Barkudia melanosticta (Schneider, 1801) — Visakhapatnam limbless skink, Russell's legless skink, distributed in parts of Circar Coast
