= Jonk River =

River in India

Coordinates: 21°42′N 82°33′E

Jonk River is a tributary of Mahanadi River that flows for approximately 210 kilometers through the Nuapada District and Bargarh District in the state of Odisha; and the Mahasamund District and Raipur District in the state of Chhattisgarh in India. The river starts from the Sunabeda plateau and enters Maraguda valley where it is joined by a stream called Gaidhas-nala near Patora village. The river forms Beniadhas fall (80 feet) and Kharaldhas Fall (150 feet) before entering the valley. It joins Mahanadi at Shivrinarayan.
