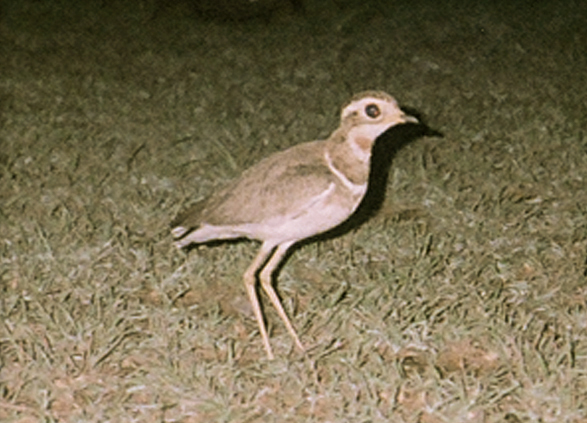
- Camera trap photograph

Conservation status
- Critically Endangered (IUCN 3.1)

Scientific classification
- Kingdom: Animalia
- Phylum: Chordata
- Class: Aves
- Order: Charadriiformes
- Family: Glareolidae
- Genus: Rhinoptilus
- Species: R. bitorquatus

Binomial name
- Rhinoptilus bitorquatus (Blyth, 1848)
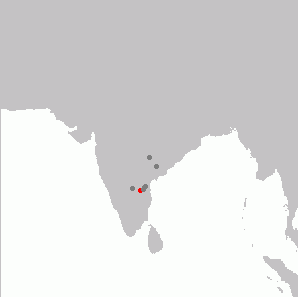
- Specimen records in grey and current distribution in red.

Synonyms
- Cursorius bitorquatus Macrotarsius bitorquatus

= Jerdon's courser =

Species of bird

Jerdon's courser (Rhinoptilus bitorquatus) is a nocturnal bird belonging to the pratincole and courser family Glareolidae endemic to India. The bird was discovered by the surgeon-naturalist Thomas C. Jerdon in 1848 but not seen again until its rediscovery in 1986.

This courser is a restricted-range endemic found locally in India in the Eastern Ghats of Andhra Pradesh. It is currently known only from the Sri Lankamalleswara Wildlife Sanctuary, and Sri Penusila Narasimha Wildlife Sanctuary where it inhabits sparse scrub forest with patches of bare ground.

== Description ==
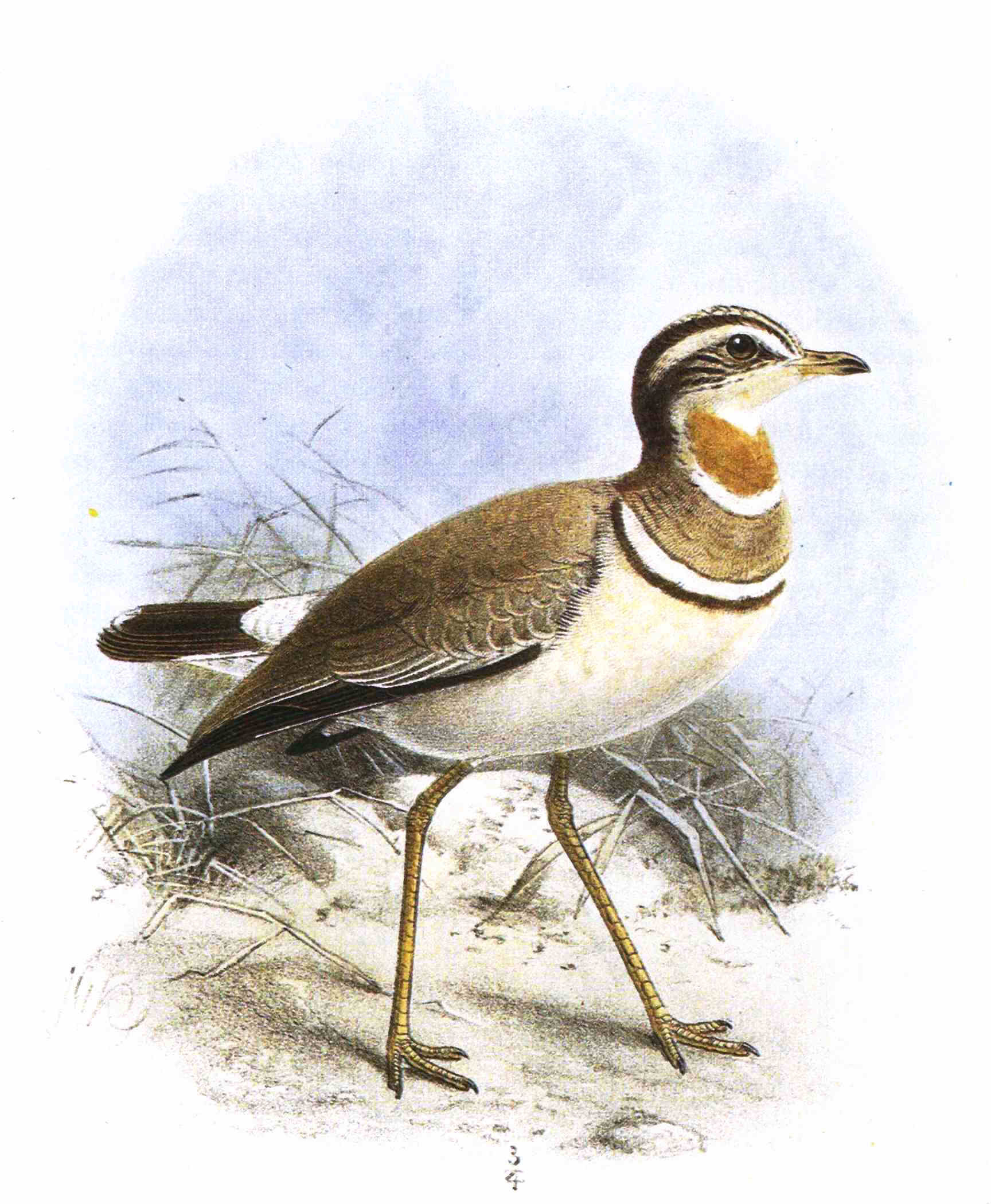
Painting by John Gerrard Keulemans

It is an unmistakable compact courser, with two brown breast-bands. It has a yellow base to the black bill, a blackish crown, broad buff supercilium, and an orange-chestnut throat patch. A narrow white crown stripe runs on top of the head. In-flight it shows a mostly black tail and a prominent white wing bar. It is crepuscular and vocal at dawn and dusk with a series of staccato Twick-too...Twick-too... Twick-too or yak-wak.. yak-wak calls. The notes are repeated at the rate of about 1 per second and uttered 2 to 16 times and several birds in the vicinity may join in the calling.

Jerdon described the Telugu name of the species as Adavi wuta-titti meaning "Jungle empty-purse". This name may however have been in error since Salim Ali and Hugh Whistler found villagers mystified by the name when they searched for the species near Borgampad and Nelipaka during the Hyderabad state survey of 1931. Recent researchers have noted the local name as Kalivi kodi.

The only known egg of the bird is preserved at the Zoology Museum, University of Aberdeen. The egg was collected by Ernest Gilbert Meaton, a vet working at Kolar Gold Fields, in the year 1917.

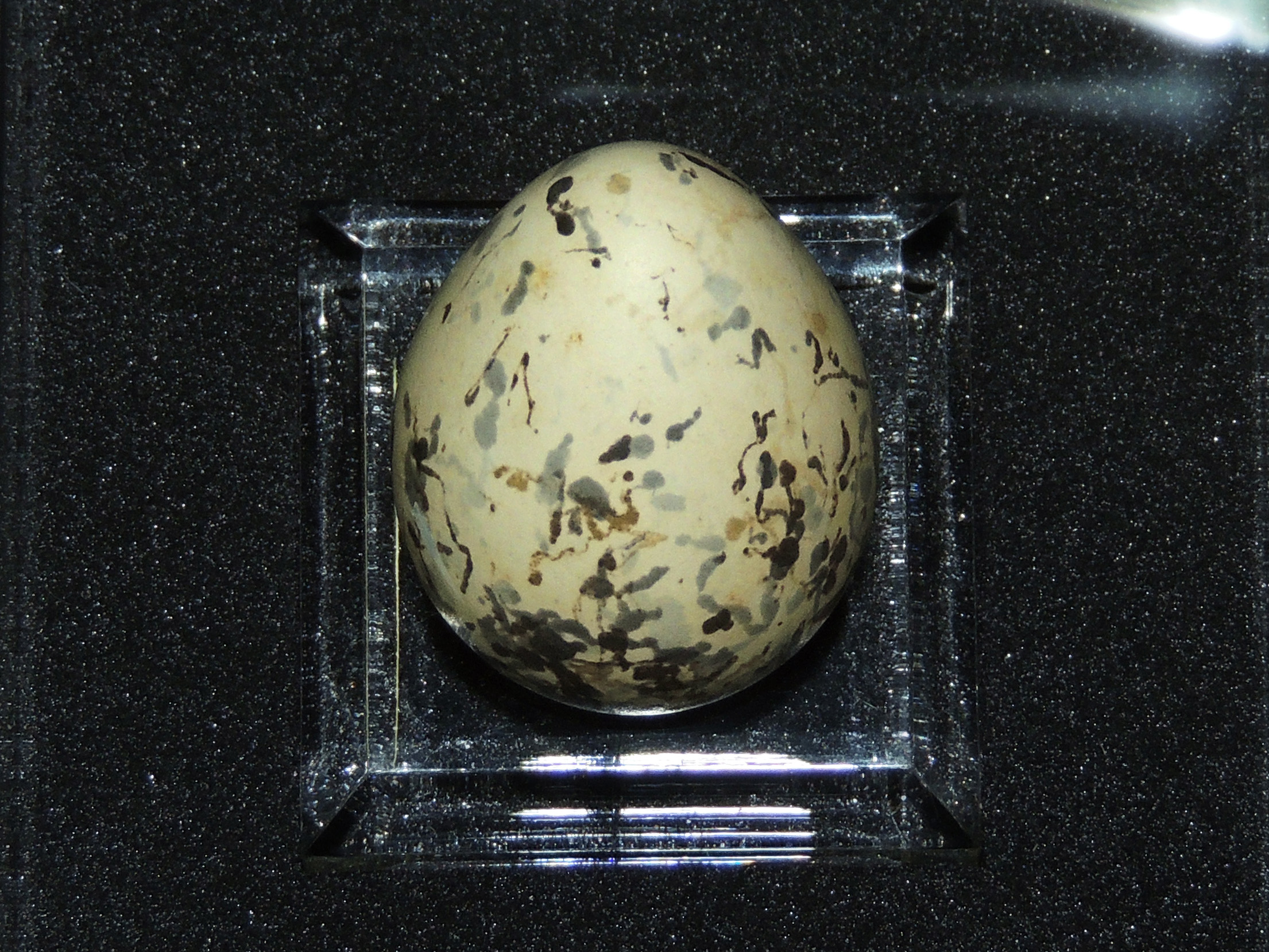
Jerdon's courser egg displayed in Zoology Museum, University of Aberdeen.

== Distribution and habitat ==
It is endemic to southern India, where it is principally known from southern Andhra Pradesh. It has an extremely limited geographical range being known from the Godaveri river valley near Sironcha and Bhadrachalam, and from the Cuddapah and Anantpur areas in the valley of the Pennar River. An egg, probably collected within 100 km of Kolar in 1917, was positively identified as belonging to this species using DNA sequence comparison. It is mostly active at dusk and during the night. It was first recorded in the mid 19th century; it was then considered to be extinct for more than 80 years, until it was rediscovered in 1986 at Cuddapah District, Andhra Pradesh. In Maharashtra it was reported at "24 km east of Sironcha, near the Godavari river, three birds, undated (Blanford 1867, 1869), and sometime in the 20-year period before 1935 (D'Abreu, 1935)". The species was known from specimens collected at a few locations in eastern peninsular India and the currently known population is extremely restricted in range. Studies in this region using sand strips to detect footprints suggest that their preferred habitat has tall bushes at a density of 300 to 700 per hectare.

== Taxonomy ==
The species was first collected by Thomas C. Jerdon from somewhere in the Eastern Ghats. The specimen was presented to the Asiatic Society of Bengal where the curator, Edward Blyth described it, naming it as Macrotarsius rhinoptilus. These collections were moved to the Indian Museum in 1866 following a financial crisis. Some specimens had been mounted and exhibited for the public but John Anderson moved the type specimens for safe storage in 1872. The type specimens used by Blyth were catalogued but the specimen used by Blyth was already missing. A second catalogue by W.L. Sclater in 1892 also failed to list the specimen. The type specimen is therefore presumed lost. A second specimen collected by Jerdon was obtained by Strickland and is now in the collection of the Cambridge University. This specimen was examined by Strickland who used the new genus and combination, Rhinoptilus bitorquatus. The label written by Alfred Newton notes the location as "Madras" and date as 1846. During this period Jerdon is thought to have received specimens from near Nellore or Cuddapah. A third specimen in Jerdon's collection was acquired by Thomas Campbell Eyton and then to Henry Baker Tristram, and the specimen is now at National Museums Liverpool. Several other specimens exist in collections but a neotype, replacement for the type specimen, has not been suggested.

== Status ==
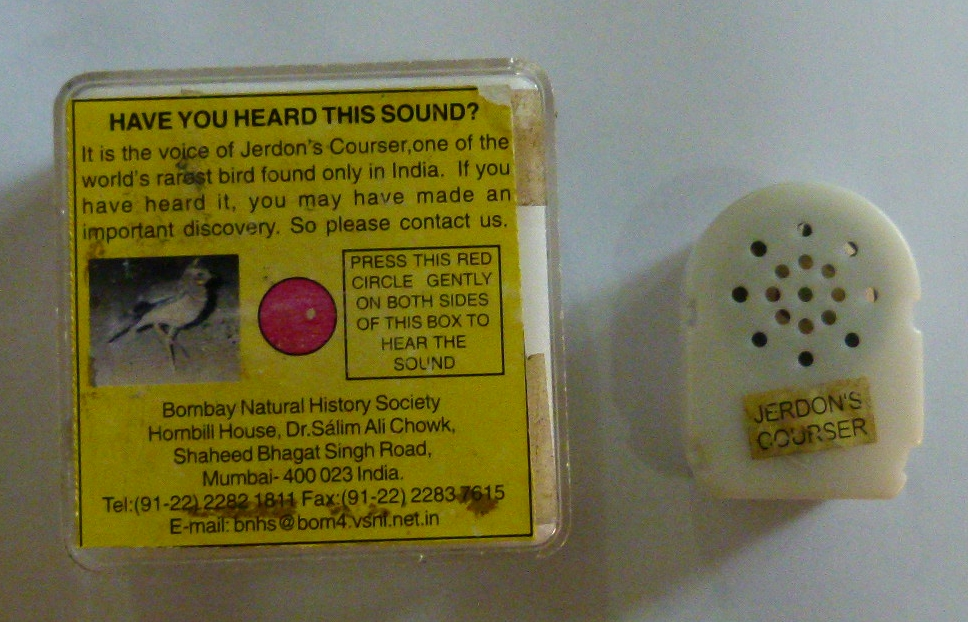
Electronic player for remembering the call

Recording of Jerdon's courser calls

This bird was known only from a few historical records and was thought to be extinct until its rediscovery in 1986. It was rediscovered by Bharat Bhushan, an ornithologist at the Bombay Natural History Society who made use of local trappers to capture a specimen. Prior to its rediscovery it was thought to be a diurnal bird. It remains critically endangered due to loss of habitat. It is nocturnal in habit and presumed to be insectivorous. Being a rare bird, nothing is known yet about its behaviour and nesting habits.

Population estimates for the bird range from between 50 and 249. Recent studies have made use of techniques such as camera trapping and carefully placed strips of fine sand to record footprints from which estimates of population density are made. The known world population of the species is restricted to a very small region and attempts have been made to find new areas by distributing pictures and small electronic call players to people in neighbouring regions that share similar habitats. Searches during 2008 in its former habitat near Sironcha in Gadchiroli district in eastern Maharashtra failed to find the birds.

In 1988 the Indian Postal Service released a stamp to commemorate the rediscovery.

In 2022, the central government sanctioned Rupees 50 lakh to study the bird. The money is said to be used for installing CCTV cameras and sound recording equipment to track its movement.

In August 2025 birders located the bird outside Lankamalleswara Wildlife Sanctuary and recorded calls.

== Threats ==
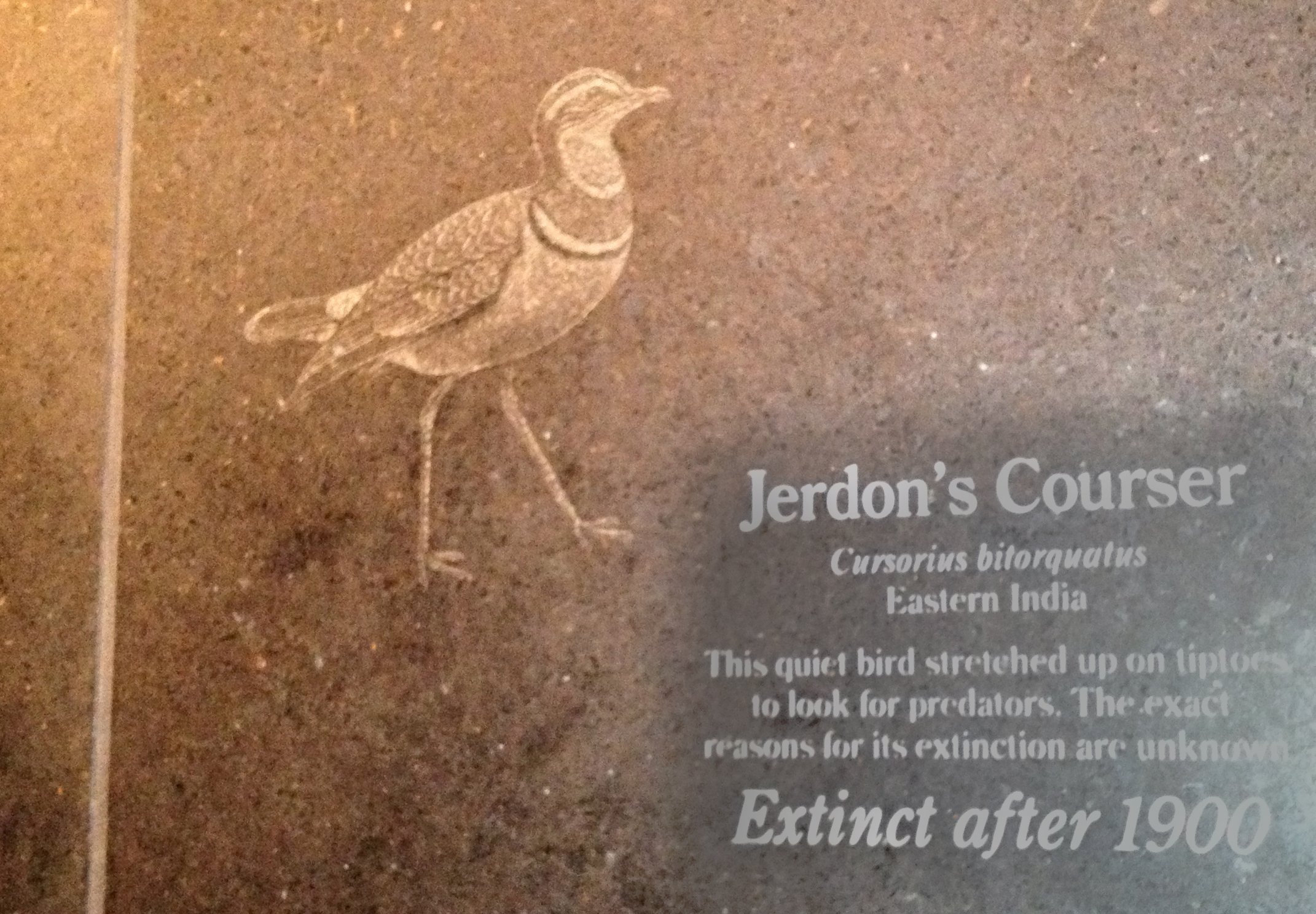
Photo showing a tombstone erected for Jerdon's courser in an exhibition area at the Bronx Zoo because it was assumed to be extinct.

The construction of the Somasilla Dam led to the residents of 57 villages being relocated into the region where the courser was rediscovered. These areas of Lankamala, Palakonda and Seshachalam were previously not well populated. With the rising population, there was increased livestock pressures and firewood extraction. In addition, extensive quarrying threatens the habitat. The scrub habitat preferred by the bird has declined due to increased agricultural activity. In December 2005, the only known location for the species was threatened by the Telugu Ganga project, a scheme to supply water to the city of Chennai. Legal action led to the diversion of the canal. The area has however continued to be threatened by illegal construction work and activity related to a project proposed to link the rivers of India. The construction of the canal could also lead to increased agricultural activity and habitat changes.
