= Spotted Eastern Ghats skink =

Scientific classification
- Kingdom: Animalia
- Phylum: Chordata
- Class: Reptilia
- Order: Squamata
- Family: Scincidae
- Genus: Sepsophis; Beddome, 1870
- Species: S. punctatus

Binomial name
- Sepsophis punctatus Beddome, 1870

Species of lizard

The spotted Eastern Ghats skink (Sepsophis punctatus) is a species of skink. It is endemic to India and known from its type locality in Andhra Pradesh (Darakondah, Golconda Hills, then Madras Presidency) and from Odissa. It is monotypic in the genus Sepsophis.
