= Khalasuni Wildlife Sanctuary =

Wildlife sanctuary in Odisha, India

- IUCN category IV (habitat/species management area)
- Interactive map of Khalasuni Wildlife Sanctuary
- Location: Sambalpur, Odisha, India
- Area: 116 km^{2} (45 sq mi)
- Established: 1982

Khalasuni Wildlife Sanctuary is a wildlife sanctuary in the Sambalpur district in the Indian state of Odisha. It is part of Sambalpur Elephant Reserve, and the Khalasuni-Satkosia corridor is one of the important elephant corridors in the state. The Badrama Wildlife Sanctuary is situated next to it.

== Fauna ==
The sanctuary hosts elephants, civets, leopards, wolves, peafowl, junglefowl, hornbill etc. Along with the Similipal and Satkosia Tiger Reserves, and the Hirakud and Kotagarh Sanctuaries, the Khalasuni Wildlife Sanctuary hosts a larger cheetah population in the state.
