= Mettala =

- Village
- Location in Tamil Nadu, India
- Coordinates: 11°30′43″N 78°20′38″E
- Country: India
- State: Tamil Nadu
- District: Namakkal
- Taluk: Rasipuram
- Panchayat Union: Namagiripettai
- Founder: Mettala people

Government
  - Type: panchayat Council
  - Body: Karkoodalpatti Panchayat
  - Chief Minister: MK Stalin
  - Namakkal M.P.: A.K.P. Chinraj A.K.P.
  - Rasipuram M.L.A: Dr. M.Mathiventhan - Minister for Tourism
  - Panchayat President: P.K.T. Rajamani P.K.T.
- Demonym(s): Tamils, Indian

Languages
  - Official: Tamil
- Time zone: UTC+5:30 (IST)
- PIN: 636 202
- Area code: +91-04287
- Vehicle registration: TN 28

Mettala is a village in Namakiripeta Union in Namakkal District of Tamil Nadu state in India.

== location ==
The village is under the Karkudalpatti Panchayat, which is a part of the Namagiripet union.

== Adjacent communities ==
It is located on the border of Namakkal district and Salem district. It is surrounded by Dhammampatti Panchayat and Rasipuram Panchayat Union on the east and Vazhlapady and Bethanyakanpalim Panchayat Union on the north.
