= Rollapadu Wildlife Sanctuary =

Wildlife sanctuary in India

- IUCN category IV (habitat/species management area)
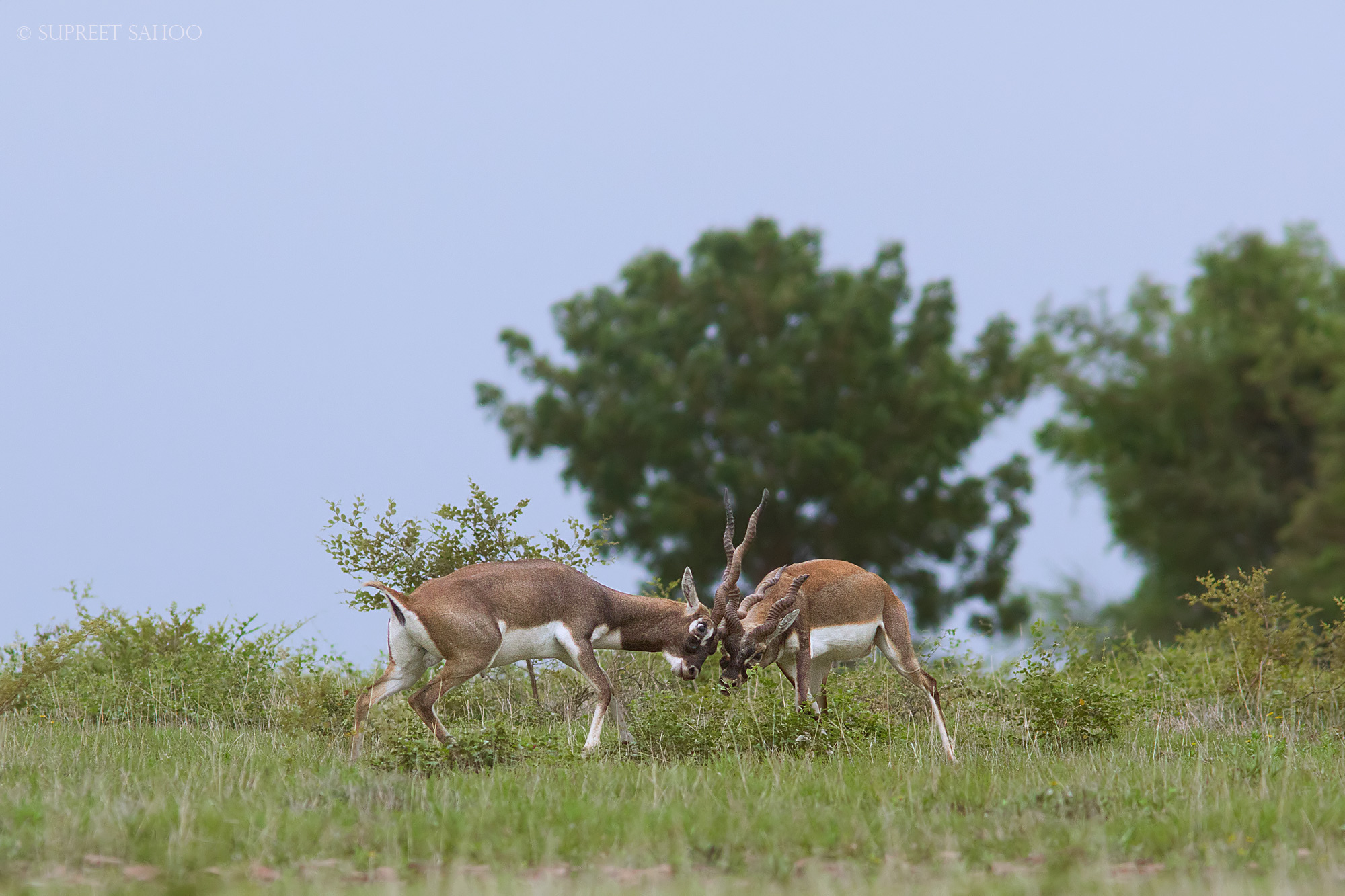
- Blackbucks sparring at Rollapadu Wildlife Sanctuary

- Location within Andhra Pradesh Location within India
- Interactive map of Rollapadu Wildlife Sanctuary
- Location: Nandyal district, Andhra Pradesh, India
- Area: 6.14 km^{2} (2.37 sq mi)
- Established: 1988

Rollapadu Wildlife Sanctuary is in Nandyal district, Andhra Pradesh, India. It is primarily as a habitat of the great Indian bustard, the species has suffered a drastic fall in its numbers in the sanctuary in recent years.

== Location ==
The sanctuary, in the Nandyal district of Andhra Pradesh, is close to the state's border with Karnataka and is 40 km (25 mi) from the district headquarters of Nandyal, 172 km (107 mi) from Kadapa, and 152 km (94 mi) from Raichur. Covering an area of 6.14 km^{2} (2.37 sq mi), it was established in 1988 to protect the great Indian bustard and the lesser florican and remains the only habitat in Andhra Pradesh for the bustard which is a critically endangered species. The sanctuary is mostly an undulating plain with hot, dry climatic conditions and erratic and uneven rainfall. It has an average elevation of 290 metres (950 ft) and receives about 450 mm (18 in) of rainfall annually.

== Flora ==
Rollapadu is primarily a grassland ecosystem with dry forests and spiny bushes. Cotton, tobacco and sunflower are cultivated in the agricultural lands that border the sanctuary. Also plants communities like Ziziphus mauritiana, Cassia fistula, Acacia, Butea monosperma etc. are very useful for birds nesting at Rollapadu.

== Fauna ==
Rollapadu sanctuary is home to a varied set of faunal and avifaunal species. Foxes, jackals, bonnet macaques, jungle cats, sloth bears and black bucks have been reported at the sanctuary as also the Russell's viper and Indian cobra. It also houses 132 bird species with the Alganur reservoir near the sanctuary frequented annually by migratory species. Some of the bird species spotted at Rollapadu besides the bustard and the florican include Indian rollers, several myna species, short-toed snake eagles and winter migrant waterfowl such as bar-headed geese, demoiselle cranes and greater flamingos.

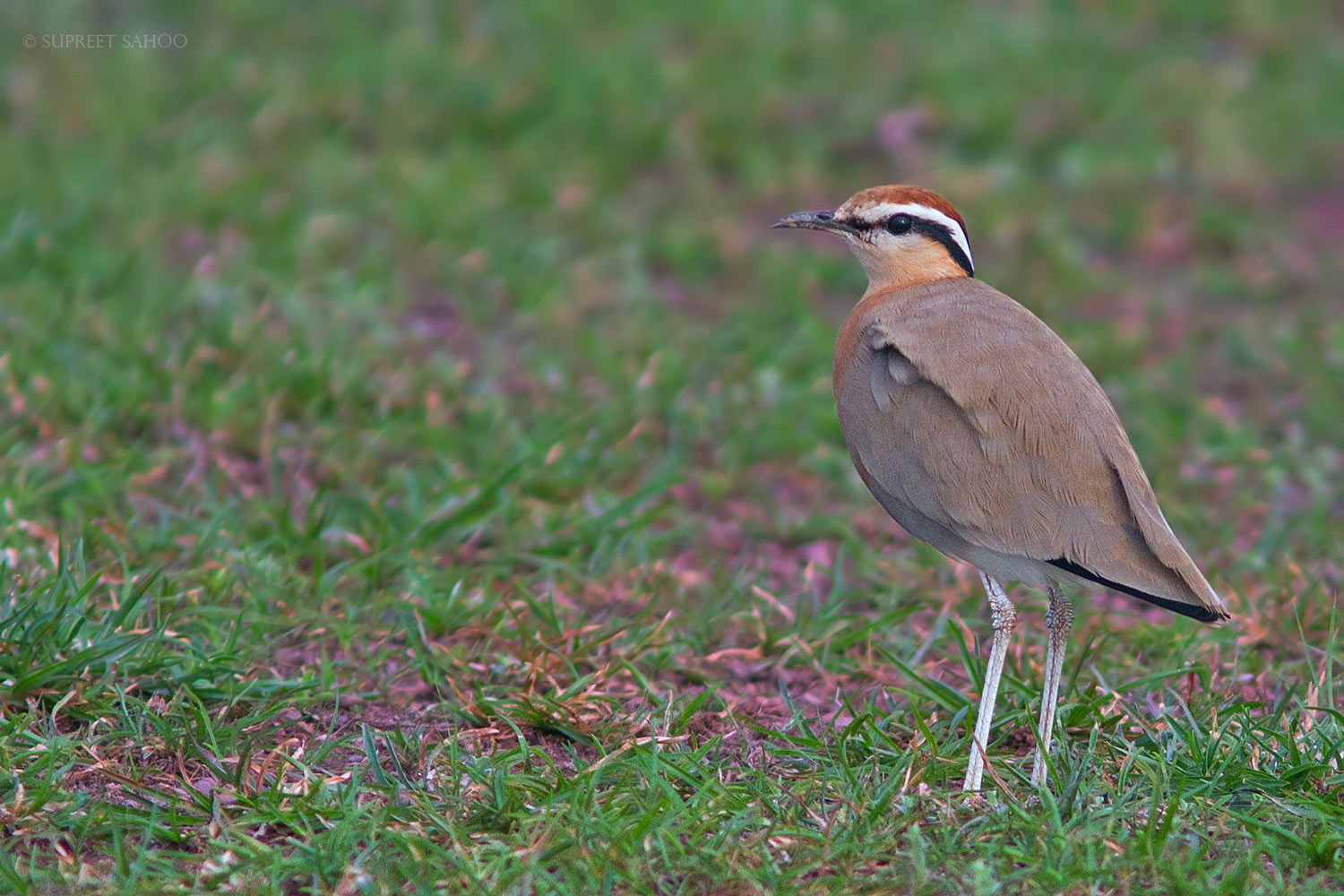
Indian coursers are found around the Rollapadu WLS during the monsoon seasons.

An increase in the blackbuck population at the sanctuary has been postulated as one of the reasons for the fall in numbers of the bustard and the florican there. Their feeding on the grasses has in turn led to a fall in the numbers of grasshoppers and locusts that constitute an important source of food for the two bird species besides also reducing the nesting area available to these ground nesting birds.

== Threats ==
Established as an ideal site for the protection of the bustard in the 1980s, conservation efforts at Rollapadu have suffered severe setbacks in recent years with the bustard population falling in recent years. The sanctuary houses nearly 800 blackbucks which often raid the farmlands beyond the sanctuary's borders and this has led to public anger against the sanctuary. Grazing of cattle within the sanctuary's precincts has also affected the breeding of the bustards. Changes in the ecosystem due to the linking of the Alganur tank with the Telugu Ganga Canal and the consequent rise in ground water levels in this semi-arid region have led to changes in flora as well as in the nature of agriculture practiced around the sanctuary's periphery. Harriers have been found dead presumably due to the effect of biomagnification. Foxes, the Lesser florican and Greater short-toed larks have not been spotted at the sanctuary in recent years.
