= Barkudia melanosticta =

Conservation status
- Data Deficient (IUCN 3.1)

Scientific classification
- Kingdom: Animalia
- Phylum: Chordata
- Class: Reptilia
- Order: Squamata
- Family: Scincidae
- Genus: Barkudia
- Species: B. melanosticta

Binomial name
- Barkudia melanosticta (Schneider, 1801)
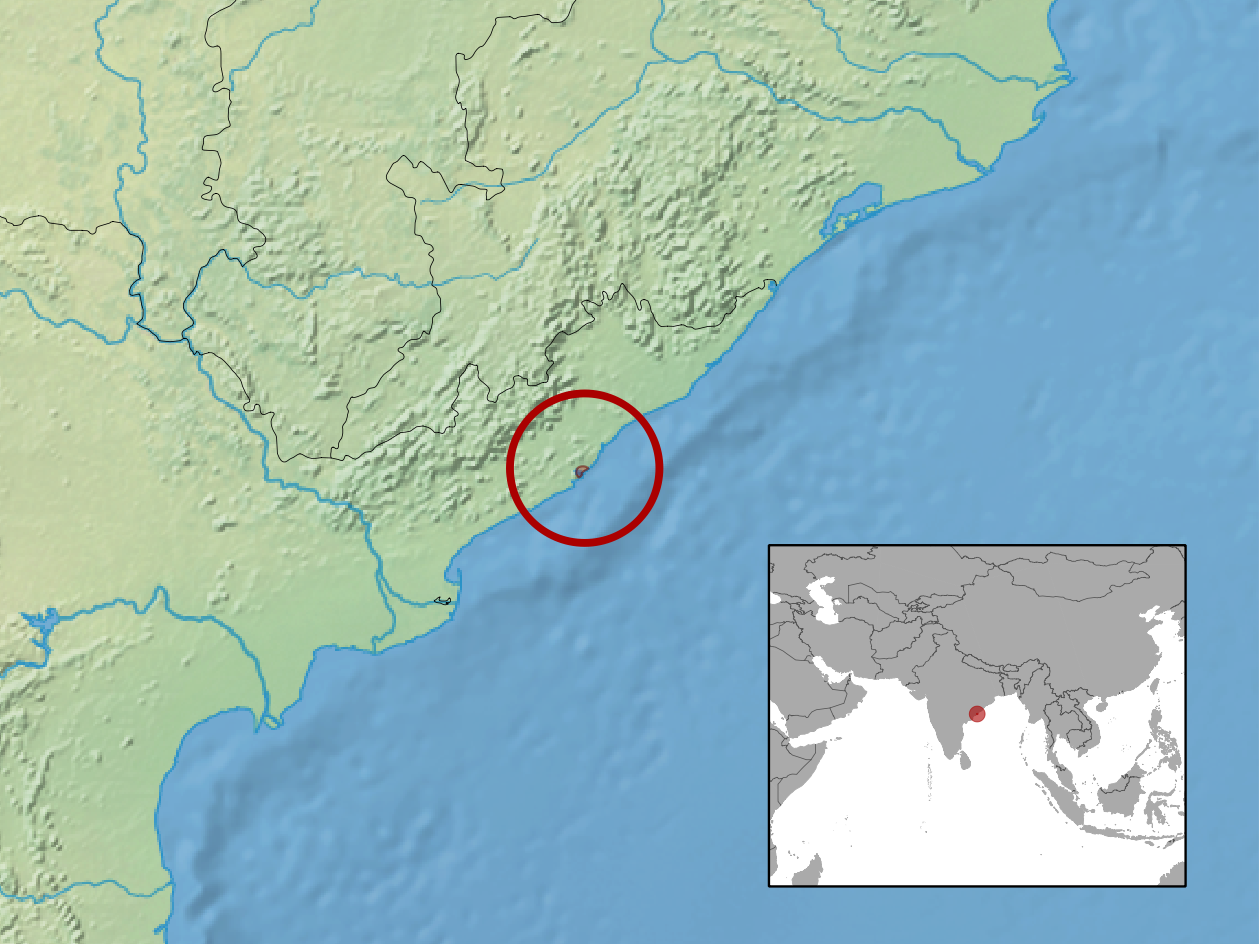

Synonyms
- Anguis melanostictus Schneider, 1801; Barkudia melanosticta — Das, 1999

Species of lizard

Barkudia melanosticta commonly known as Visakhapatnam limbless skink or Russell's legless skink is a skink endemic to Vishakapatnam region of Circar Coast, in Andhra Pradesh state of southeastern India. One of the foremost of Indian reptiles collected during the days of Patrick Russell in 1790s, this species' type specimen was considered lost. Later its taxonomy was fixed by redescribing recent collections dating between 1950s-80s by professors of Andhra University, Waltair from their campus, and deposited in the Zoological Survey of India in Kolkata, India (fide I. Das).

== Geographic range ==
B. melanosticta is known only from the vicinity of its type locality - Visakhapatnam in the Indian state of Andhra Pradesh.

== Description ==
A burrowing species, B. melanosticta has an elongated body, with no legs. The eyes are vestigial, with only lower eyelids. The ear openings are slit-like. It may attain a snout-to-vent length of 16.5 cm (6.5 in), plus a tail 6.8 cm (2.7 in) long.
