= Ushakothi Wildlife Sanctuary =

Protected area in Odisha, India

- Badrama Wildlife Sanctuary
- IUCN category IV (habitat/species management area)
- Location within Odisha Location within India
- Interactive map of Ushakothi Wildlife Sanctuary
- Location: Odisha
- Nearest city: Sambalpur
- Coordinates: 21.497164°N 84.291226°E
- Area: 304 km^{2} (117 sq mi)
- Designated: 1962
- Administrator: Divisional Forest Officer, Bamra Wildlife Division

Ushakothi Wildlife Sanctuary, also called Badrama Wildlife Sanctuary was established in 1962 over a forest area of about 304.03 square kilometres. It is situated at a distance of about 22 kilometres from Sambalpur, India. To the west of the Sanctuary lies Hirakud Dam.

The sanctuary consist of principal dry deciduous forest with floral species like sal, sandalwood, arjun, neem, acacia, casuarinas. The fauna includes, amongst others, tigers, elephants, sambar, leopards and bison. Presently there are about 15 tigers and 35 elephants in the sanctuary. It is rich in avifaunal wealth and the main attraction of this sanctuary are racket tail drangos and flying squirrel. For night halts there is one two roomed forest rest house inside the sanctuary. The reservations can be done through the Divisional Forest Officer of the same sanctuary, Sambalpur.

== How To Reach ==
Ushakoti Wildlife Sanctuary in situated 22 kilometres (14 mi) from Sambalpur on NH-53, which is Mumbai-Kolkata Highway or AH-46. The Highway dissects the sanctuary in 2 parts. Travelling in vehicles during dawn, evening & night time is very risky. Cases of accidents due to Elephants & other animals are very common. Tourists are advised to travel in Ushakoti region at day time only from 6.00 AM to 6.00 PM.

== Lodging ==
For night halts there is a two roomed forest rest house inside the sanctuary. The reservations can be done through the Divisional Forest Officer of the same sanctuary, Sambalpur.

== Recent Development ==
Divisional Forest Officer of Sambalpur Forest Division is currently working with Indian Wildlife activists to make Ushakoti Sanctuary a Eco-Sensitive Reserved Zone. The case is going on in Odisha High Court. Once it is done, the NH-53, which is Mumbai-Kolkata Highway or AH-46 will have to be diverted in a new alignment bypassing the Ushakoti Wildlife Sanctuary.

== See also ==
- Khalasuni Wildlife Sanctuary
