= Sri Lankamalleswara Wildlife Sanctuary =

Protected area in Andhra Pradesh, India

- Lankamala Wildlife Sanctuary
- IUCN category IV (habitat/species management area)
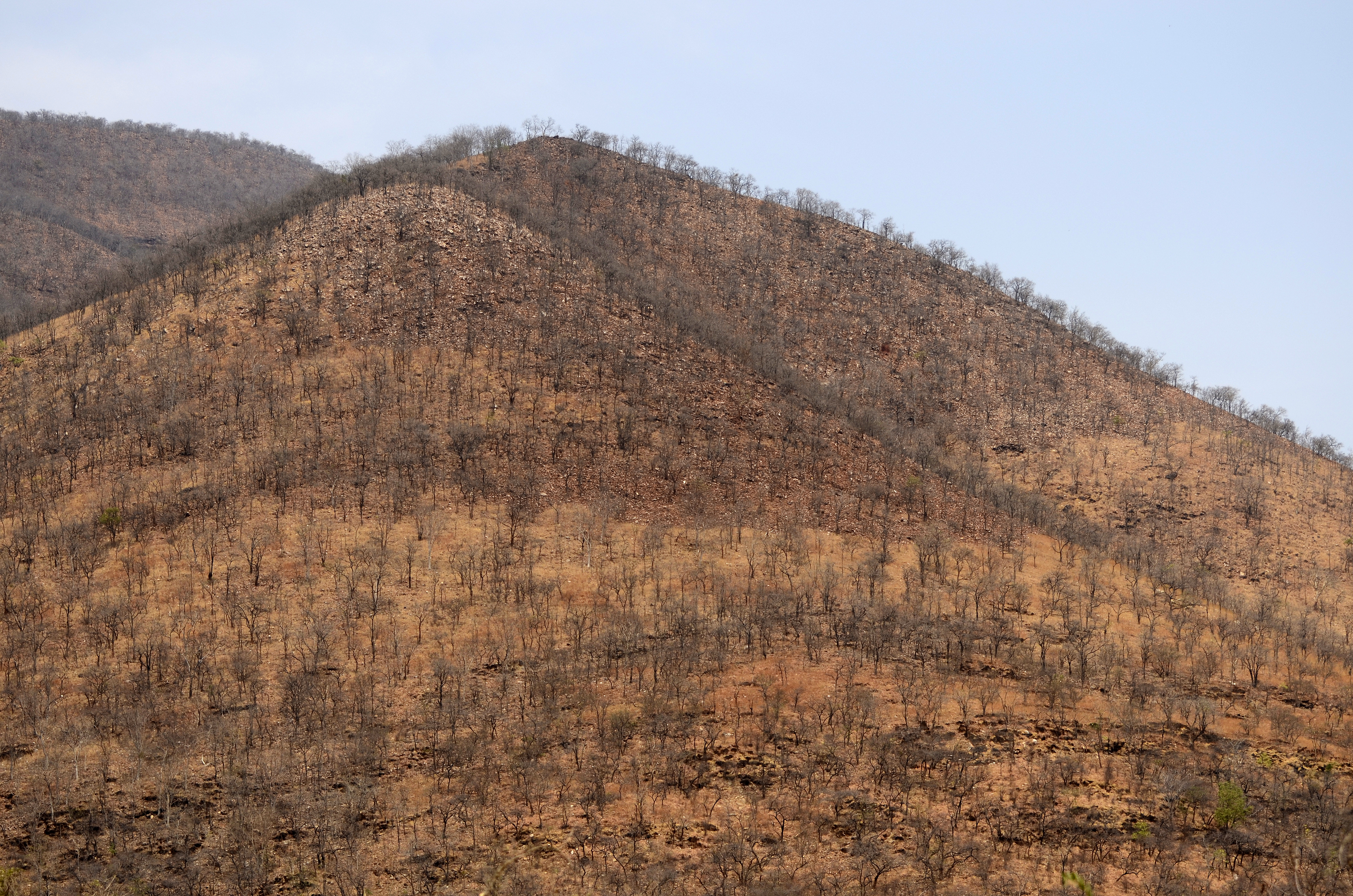

- Location within Andhra Pradesh Location within India
- Interactive map of Sri Lankamalleswara Wildlife Sanctuary
- Location: Kadapa District, Andhra Pradesh, India
- Nearest city: Kadapa
- Coordinates: 14°36′N 78°53′E
- Area: 464.42 km^{2} (179.31 sq mi)

Sri Lankamalleswara Wildlife Sanctuary is a wildlife sanctuary headquartered in Kadapa, Andhra Pradesh, India. It is the only habitat in the world which provides home for the Jerdon's courser, a highly endangered bird species. In addition to that it is also a home to nearly 176 families of vegetation and living organisms. After the rediscovery of Jerdon's courser, the area of discovery was declared as Lankamaleswara wildlife sanctuary.

== History ==
The Sanctuary is well known for its habitation of the Jerdon's courser which is a critically endangered species. The bird was first discovered in 1848 by the surgeon-naturalist Thomas C. Jerdon and was thought to be extinct until its rediscovery in 1986. The bird now inhabits the sparse scrub regions and forests of the Sri Lanka Malleshwara Sanctuary where the topography and weather conditions are compatible with its existence.

== Flora and fauna ==
The Sanctuary provides a home to nearly 1400 plant species and nearly 176 families of vegetation and living organisms. It has dry deciduous mixed thorn forests with deep gorges and steep slopes. Red Sanders, an endemic species, can be found here. Its fauna includes the panther, sloth bear, cheetal, sambar, chowsingha, chinkara, nilgai, wild boar, fox and the Jerdon's courser.
