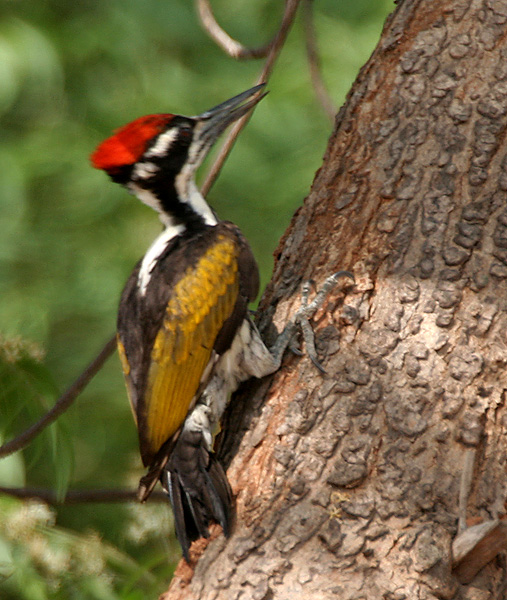
- Male in Hyderabad, India

Conservation status
- Least Concern (IUCN 3.1)

Scientific classification
- Kingdom: Animalia
- Phylum: Chordata
- Class: Aves
- Order: Piciformes
- Family: Picidae
- Genus: Chrysocolaptes
- Species: C. festivus

Binomial name
- Chrysocolaptes festivus (Boddaert, 1783)

= White-naped woodpecker =

Species of bird

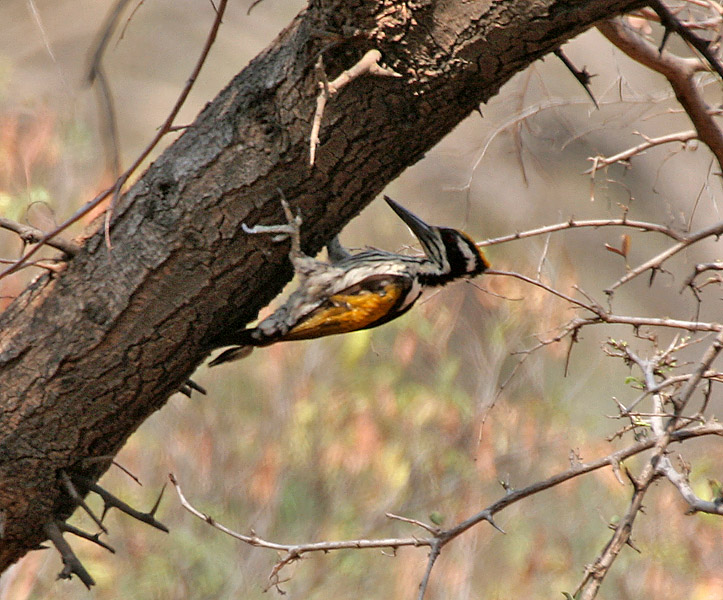
Female in Hyderabad, India

The white-naped woodpecker (Chrysocolaptes festivus) is woodpecker which is a widespread but a scarce breeder in the Indian subcontinent. It is associated with open forest and scrub with some trees. It nests in a tree hole, laying one or two white eggs.

== Taxonomy ==
The white-naped woodpecker was described by the French polymath Georges-Louis Leclerc, Comte de Buffon in 1780 in his Histoire Naturelle des Oiseaux from a specimen collected in Goa, on the southwest coast of India. The bird was also illustrated in a hand-coloured plate engraved by François-Nicolas Martinet in the Planches Enluminées D'Histoire Naturelle which was produced under the supervision of Edme-Louis Daubenton to accompany Buffon's text. Neither the plate caption nor Buffon's description included a scientific name but in 1783 the Dutch naturalist Pieter Boddaert coined the binomial name Picus festivus in his catalogue of the Planches Enluminées. The white-naped woodpecker is now placed in the genus Chrysocolaptes that was introduced by the English zoologist Edward Blyth in 1843. The genus name combines the Ancient Greek khrusos meaning "gold" and kolaptēs meaning "chiseller". The specific epithet festivus is Latin for "festive" or "cheerful".

Two subspecies are recognised:

- C. f. festivus (Boddaert, 1783) – central and south India
- C. f. tantus Ripley, 1946 – Sri Lanka

== Description ==
The white-naped woodpecker is a large species at 29 cm (11 in) in length. It is a typical woodpecker shape. The white hind neck extends down the back, and the black shoulder patches also continue onto the back to form a V-shape bordering the white. The rest of the upperparts and wings are golden yellow. The rump and tail are black, and the underparts are white with dark chevron markings. The head is whitish with a dark moustache stripe and a black eye patch that extends down the neck sides. The adult male white-naped woodpecker has a red crown and females have a yellow crown. Young birds are colored like the female, but duller.

Like other woodpeckers, this species has a straight pointed bill, a stiff tail to provide support against tree trunks, and zygodactyl or "yoked" feet, with two toes pointing forward, and two backward. The long tongue can dart forward to capture insects.
