= Sunabeda Wildlife Sanctuary =

Wildlife sanctuary in Odisha, India

- IUCN category IV (habitat/species management area)
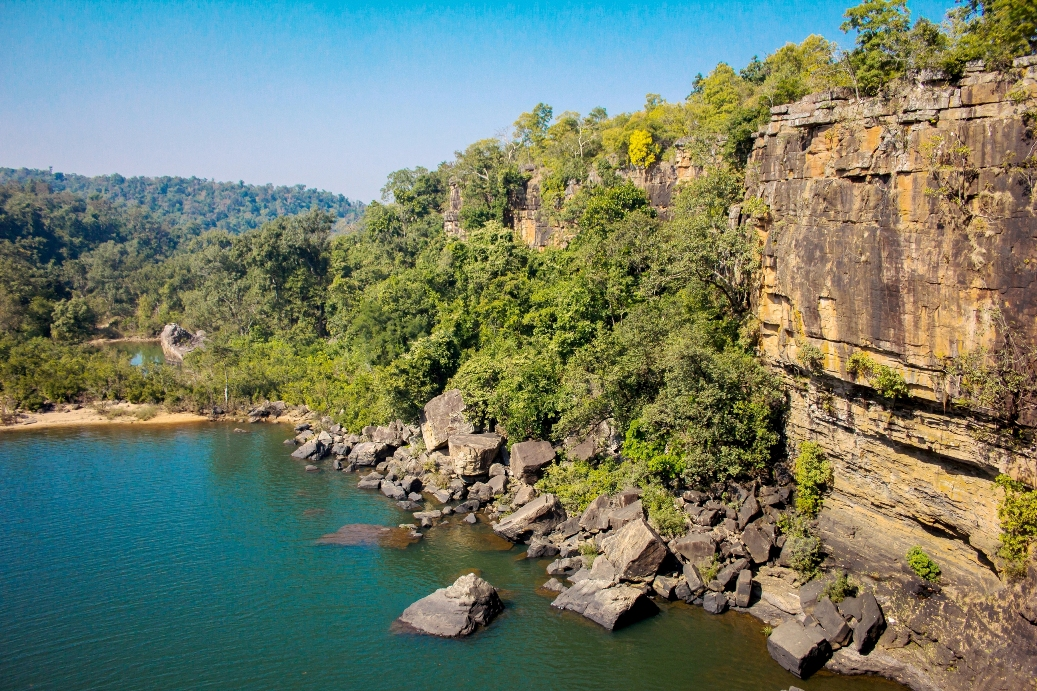
- A Cliff in Sunabeda wildlife Sanctuary

- Location within Odisha Location within India
- Interactive map of Sunabeda Wildlife Sanctuary
- Location: Odisha, India
- Nearest city: Nuapada
- Coordinates: 20.454270°N 82.497678°E
- Area: 600 square kilometres (230 sq mi)
- Established: 1988
- Website: www.wildlife.odisha.gov.in/WebPortal/PA_Sunabeda.aspx

Sunabeda Wildlife Sanctuary is a wildlife sanctuary and a proposed tiger reserve located in the Nuapada district of Odisha, adjoining Chhattisgarh. It has a total area of 600 km^{2} (230 sq mi). The sanctuary harbours a great diversity of wildlife habitats, with a vast plateau, multiple valleys, gorges and magnificent waterfalls. The sanctuary forms the catchment area of the Jonk River, over which a dam has been constructed to facilitate irrigation. The Indra nullah and Udanti River lies to the south of the sanctuary. The important vegetation of the site comprises dry deciduous tropical forest.

== Wildlife ==
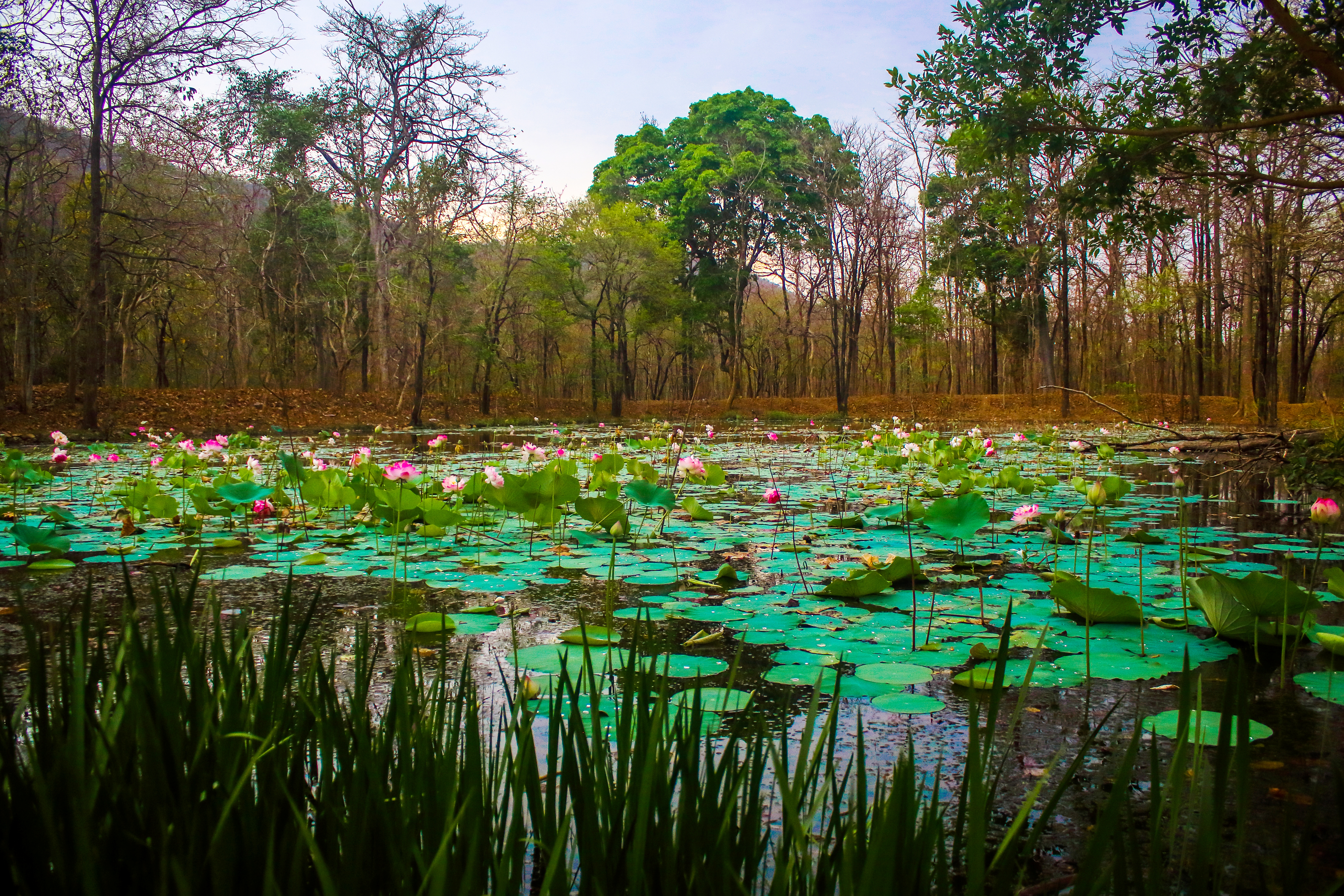
A beautiful watering hole in the sanctuary

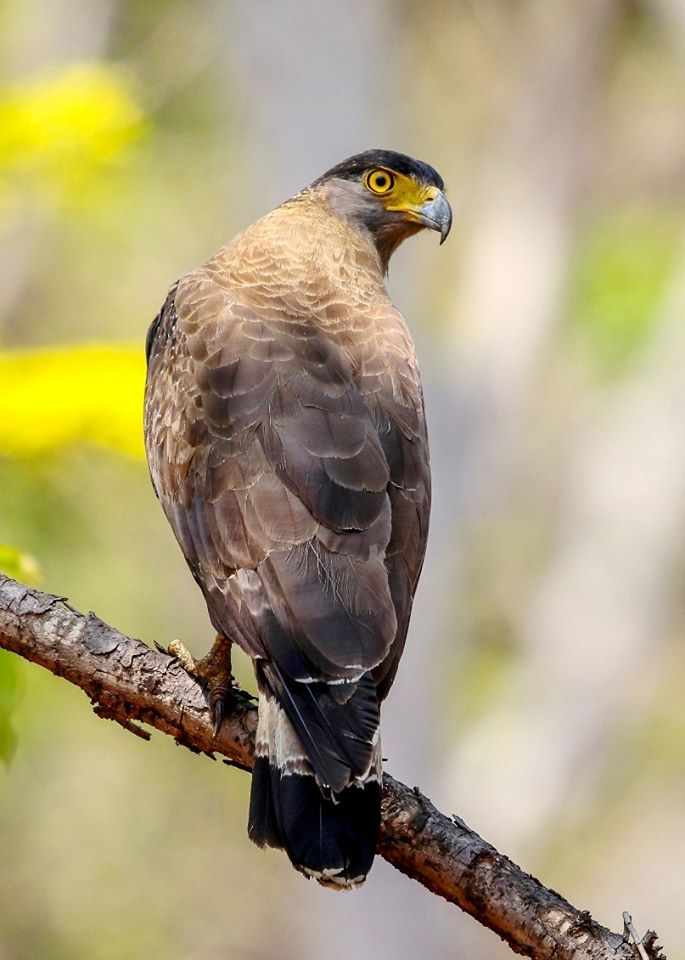
Crested Serpent Eagle at Cherchuan entry point

Typical central Indian wild mammals such as tiger (Panthera tigris), leopard (P. pardus), Indian Gaur (Bos gaurus), sloth bear (Melursus ursinus), barking deer (Muntiacus muntjak), wild boar (Sus scrofa) and blue bull (Boselaphus tragocamelus) are found, although depleted by poaching. Among the non-human primates, common langur (Semnopithecus entellus) and rhesus monkey (Macaca mulatta) are very common. (Kotwal 1997).

Sunabeda Wildlife Sanctuary has certainly seen better days. It had swamp deer (Cervus duvauceli branderi) and Wild water buffalo (Bubalus arnee). Forests around Sunabeda used to have good numbers of Wild Buffalos till 1960s. Hunting, cattle borne disease and habitat destruction led to extinction of Wild Buffalo in the region. Unconfirmed and occasional movement of individuals are reported sometime near Sitanadi but that's just a speculation. With the efforts of Chhattisgarh government, there is some chance that we could get back wild buffaloes in forests of Indravati and Sitanadi-Udanti but situation continues to be precarious.

Same is the case of hardground Barasingha which were once seen on the plateaus till 1950s and they just vanished, wild buffaloes way. Today they are extinct and there is no chance of revival.

Sunabeda is perhaps the only place left in Odisha which is now reporting Nilgai. They were in plenty earlier in the Sunabeda plateau but poaching has taken a toll over the years. Today they have also gone nocturnal. These all factors have resulted in dwindling big cat population. Due to scarcity of prey, cattle kills will go up in coming days and subsequently complete eradication of the big cats.

== Avifauna ==
Around 200 species of birds have been reported from this area (H.K. Bisht in litt. 2002). BirdLife International (undated) has listed 59 species in biome-11 (Indo-Malayan tropical dry zone), of which 18 have been seen till now, but more are likely to occur. Except for the two Gyps vultures, which are now included in the critically endangered category by BirdLife International (2001) due to their steep decline during the last 10 years, none of the other species is threatened with extinction.

Biome-11 includes a wide range of habitats, including forests and open country. Many of the species listed have adapted to man-modified habitats. Some species have deviated so far from their earlier distribution that they may not be useful in identifying IBAs for the protection of this biome (BirdLife International, undated).

Forest Owlet: In February 1877, Valentine Ball had collected the specimen of Forest Owlet (Athene blewitti) on the banks of River Udanti towards the southern boundary of Sunabeda sanctuary. This fact should have been a great motivator for the foresters and officers in the region to look out for this species which till recently was thought to be extinct from India until its reappearance in Satpuda region in 1997. Search for this specie continues and avifauna lovers are much hopeful that one day, the elusive Forest Owlet reappears in the last remaining Teak patches in the forests of Khariar. Teak patches are favored by the Forest owlet. If that happens, that would be the biggest boost for the region including the cause of tiger.

About other important species:

The region also is one of the best places in Odisha to see Red collared Doves, Bonellis Eagle, and Common Babblers which is not very common in Odisha barring few records. We also have recorded a plethora of species that supports the fact that Sunabeda forests are an abode to a wide range of avifauna diversity. Some of the species that has been documented include Indian Pitta, Banded bay Cuckoo, Indian Paradise Flycatchers, Jungle Owlet, Tickell's Flycatcher, Sulphur bellied warbler etc. Based on historical records, the search for Chestnut bellied Sandgrouse and Indian Courser continues which are no more found in Odisha

== Tiger reserve status ==
Sunabeda has received 'in-principle-approval' of the National Tiger Conservation Authority, proposals for its notification as per NTCA-guidelines is under preparation. The proposed tiger reserve extends over 956.17 km^{2} (longitude - 82°20'0" to 82°34'48" east and latitude 20°06'0" to 20°44'0" north), in Nuapada district bordering the state of Chhattisgarh to the west of Odisha, and encompasses the Sunabeda Sanctuary (591.75 km^{2}) and the Patdhara forest block to its south (364.42 km^{2}).

== Sunabeda campaigns ==
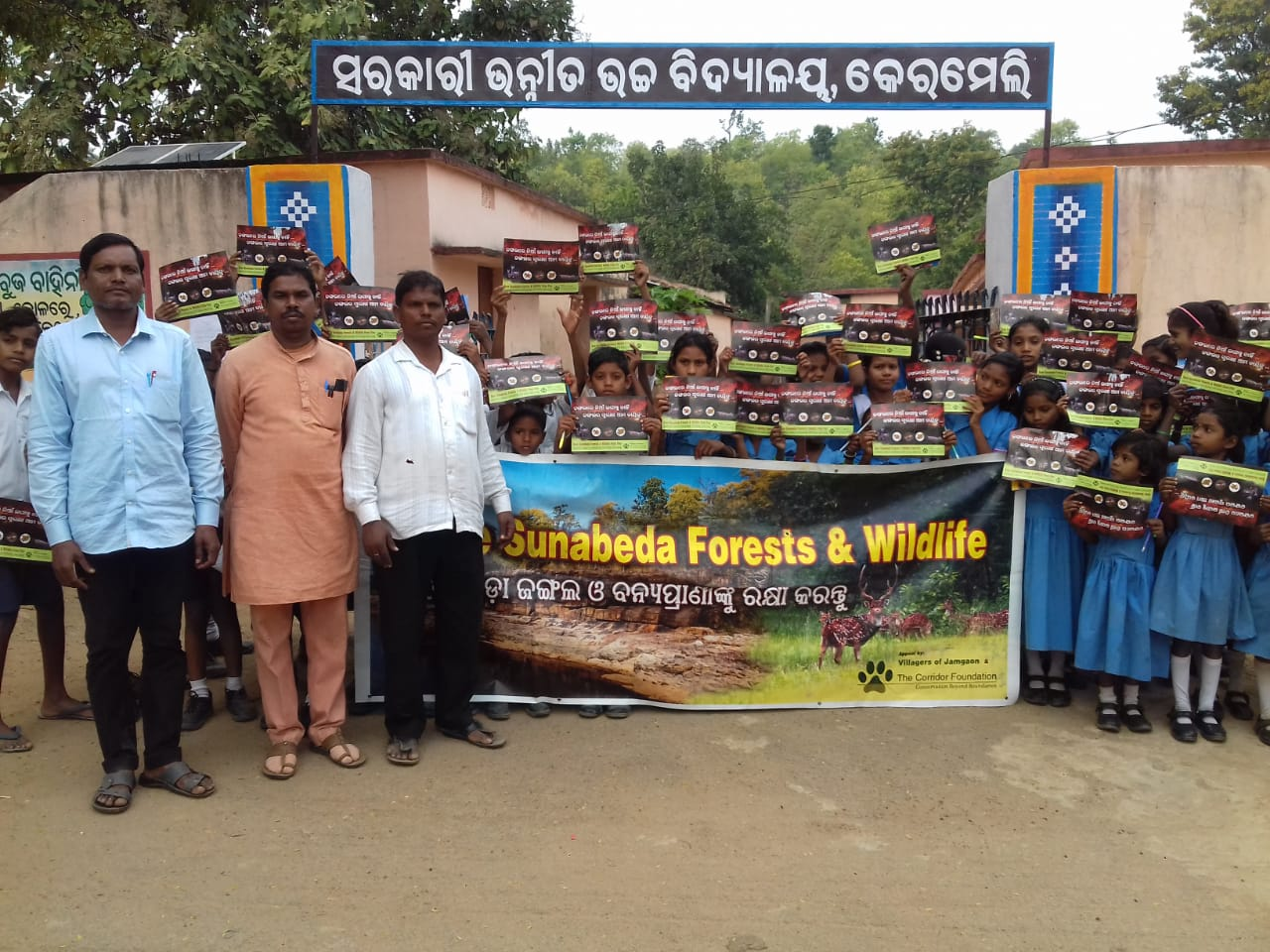
Awareness Program by The Corridor Foundation

The Corridor Foundation, a volunteering organisation has been working since 2017 on creating awareness for wildlife conservation. Local volunteers from villages like Cherchuan, Jamgaon, Sunabeda, Kholibhitar have joined hands to protect the forests. Apart from awareness programs, multiple events have been organised involving school children. Also the organisation has been continuously influencing National Tiger Conservation Authority and Odisha State Forest Department to declare the wildlife sanctuary as Tiger Reserve, a much awaited step in conserving this last habitat of Tigers in Western Odisha. Also programs like Sapling distribution, plantation and biodiversity documentation has been carried out by the organisation.

Wild Orissa's Sunabeda Tiger Conservation Programme is going on since 1997. As part of this programme special emphasis has been laid upon tiger conservation in the forests of Sunabeda-Khariar in the Nuapara district of Orissa constitute a vital tiger habitat. The last census in 2002 put the tiger population in the 600 km^{2}. Sunabeda Sanctuary itself at about 24 individuals. In addition, the neighbouring Khariar forests, measuring about 450 km^{2}., also support a few tigers. Together, these forests harbour a reasonably large tiger gene pool, with long term conservation potential. A compact patch of about 1,000 km^{2}. could be earmarked for the Sunabeda Tiger Reserve.

Also of interest is the movement of the extremely rare wild buffalo, (Bubalus arnee) in the area. These wild bovines enter Orissa from the Udanti and Sitanadi forests in Chhattisgarh. Given that this species is on the verge of extinction in central India, protecting Sunabeda is of vital national importance.

The forests of the Sunabeda Sanctuary are sparsely populated. The region has thus far escaped the attentions of Orissa's timber mafia. Three rivers and 11 major streams provide plentiful water sources. Sunabeda assumes even more importance when one considers that it is contiguous with the Udanti and Sitanadi forests in Chhattisgarh state to the west. If Sunabeda and Khariar are also given Project Tiger status, a large and extremely viable tiger habitat would be safeguarded.

== Threats and conservation issues ==
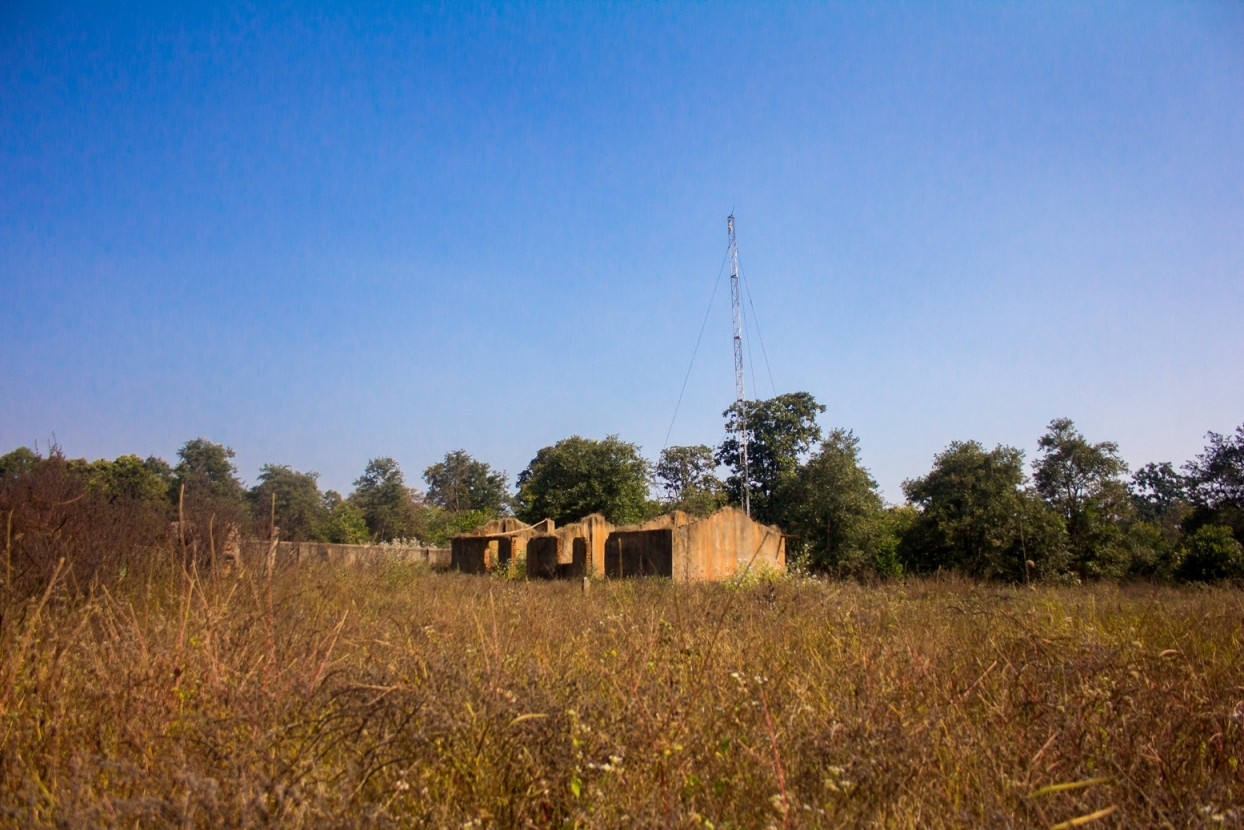
Crumbled forest beat houses

- Human pressure
- Livestock grazing
- Encroachment of forestland
- Forest fire
- Unsustainable exploitation of the forest resources
- Illegal felling
- Defunct Forest infrastructure on non existent monitoring/patrolling by Forest Department
- Presence of Naxals

According to Kotwal (1997), the highly endangered wild buffalo used to occur here nearly 70 years ago. At present, they are found in Udanti Wildlife Sanctuary in Chhattisgarh, about 20 km away but there is a Patdhara Reserve Forest corridor. Efforts should be made to improve the habitat so that the wild buffalo can come back to Sunabeda using this corridor. This would give a boost to the protection of this sanctuary, which is important for birds also.

About 64 villages, with a human population of 20,000, fragment this sanctuary and there is a large population of cattle. The villagers subsist on forest products to a great extent, as they have land holdings with poor yield. Grazing and encroachment of forest land for cultivation of Cannabis sativa are major threats to the sanctuary. Graziers from other states including Rajasthan arrive here with their camels and goats, which compete with local herbivores for the grass. Though there is a proposal for a tiger reserve, there are extensive encroachments inside the sanctuary. It is doubtful if these people could be shifted.

The core area of Sunabeda could be increased southwards across the Indra nullah (stream), to add 30,000 ha of forest without human habitation (Kotwal 1997).

Following are the recommendations by NGO, The Corridor Foundation made to NTCA and State Government based on detailed study in the area between 2018 and 2020.

1. Immediately Notify Sunabeda as a Tiger Reserve, which has been pending since long after in- principle approval has been communicated by the NTCA.
2. Take up the matter with Home Department to sanitise the area from Naxalites.
3. Create an enabling environment for forest staff to return to their positions for any meaningful work.
4. Ground massive awareness campaign in enclosed and fringe villages and towns of Khariar and Nuapada with people as stakeholders.
5. Forest and wildlife staff needs to be provided with required amenities including free ration, prophylactic/ preventive medicines, support auxiliary staff and a vehicle in each Range.
6. Monitoring wild animals should start earnestly after staff positioning so that it becomes ingrained in routine work.
7. Implement the management plan in a participatory mode with the EDC/ VSS.
8. Work out, initiate and implement a model voluntary relocation plan in a way that, it shall have a spread effect.
9. Issue a direction to prevent migratory livestock entering the area.
10. Wildlife wing in collaboration with District Collector to facilitate income generating activities for villagers to create conducive wildlife- people interface.
