= Wildlife of Karnataka =

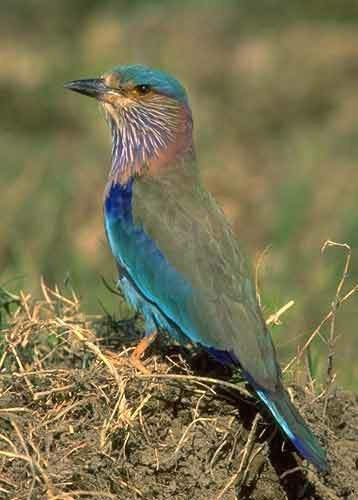
Indian roller (Coracias benghalensis), the state bird

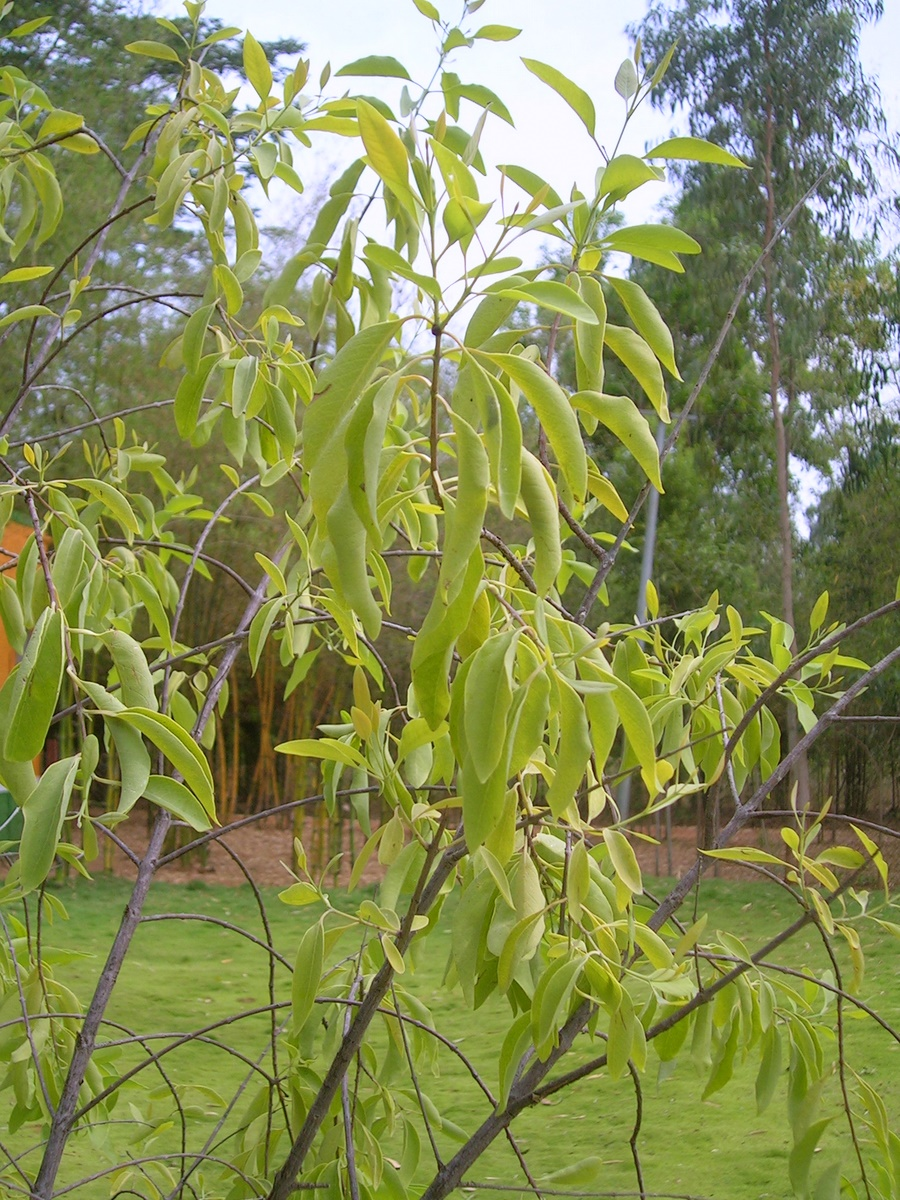
Young sapling of sandalwood (Santalum album), the state tree

The state of Karnataka in South India has a rich diversity of flora and fauna. It has a recorded forest area of 38,720 km^{2} which constitutes 55% of the geographical area of the state. These forests support 25% of the elephant population and 20% of the tiger population of India. Many regions of Karnataka are still unexplored and new species of flora and fauna are still found.

The mountains of the Western Ghats in the western region of Karnataka are a biodiversity hotspot. Two sub-clusters of the Western Ghats, Talacauvery and Kudremukh, are on a tentative list of sites that could be designated as World Heritage Sites by UNESCO. The Bandipur and Nagarahole national parks which fall outside these subclusters were included in the Nilgiri biosphere reserve in 1986, a UNESCO designation. In the Biligiriranga Hills the Eastern Ghats meet the Western Ghats.

The state bird and state animal of Karnataka are Indian roller and the Indian elephant. The state tree and state flower are sandalwood (Santalum album) and lotus. Karnataka is home to 524 tigers (around 12% of tigers in world).

== National parks ==
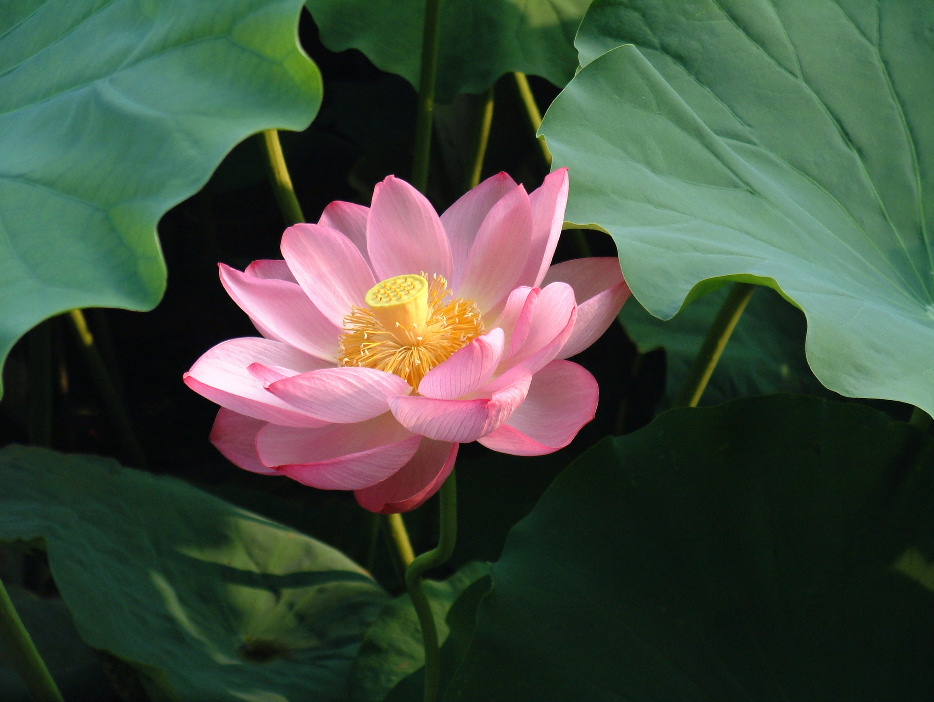
Lotus, the state flower

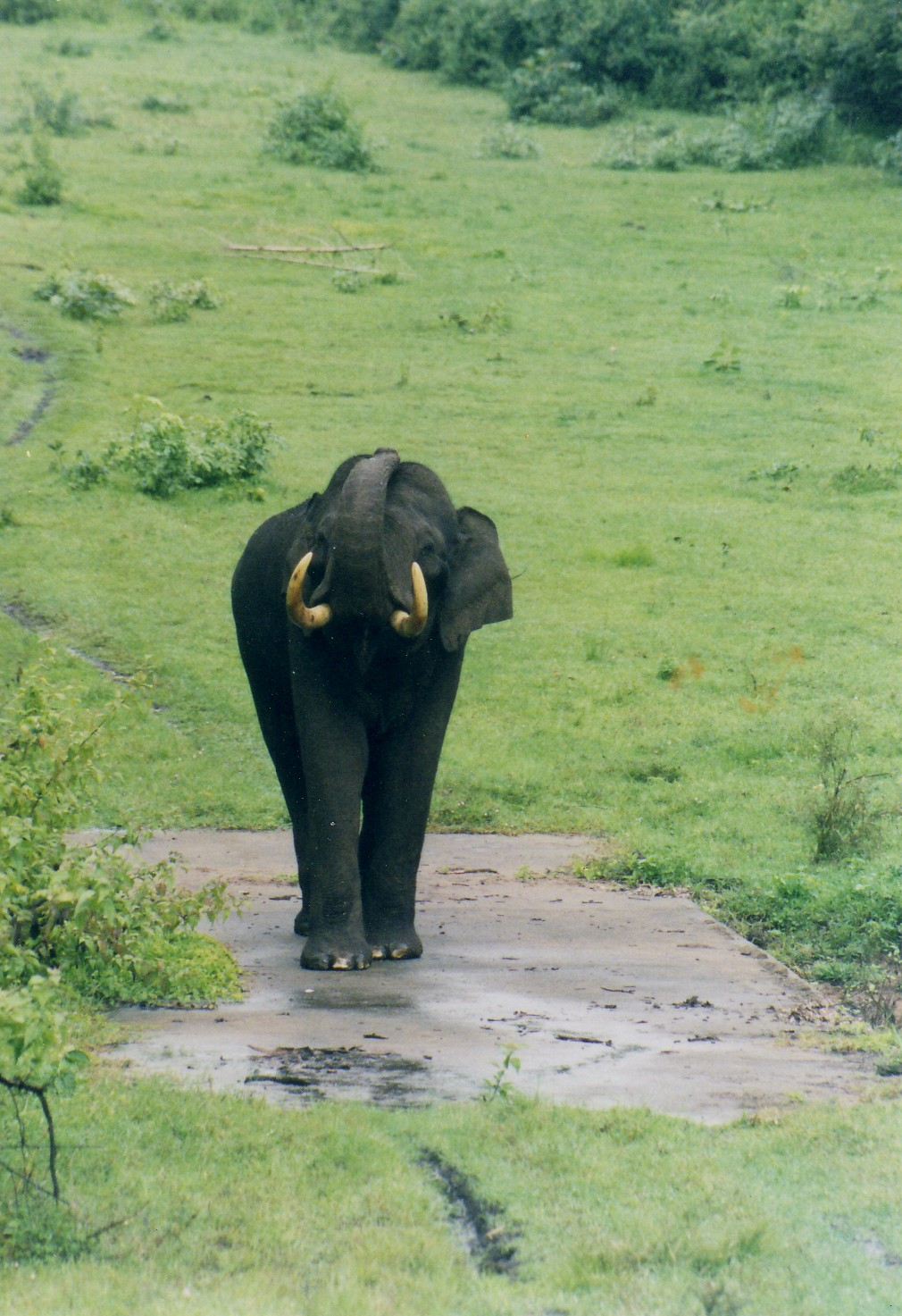
Lone Indian elephant (Elephas maximus indicus), the state animal, in Nagarahole National Park

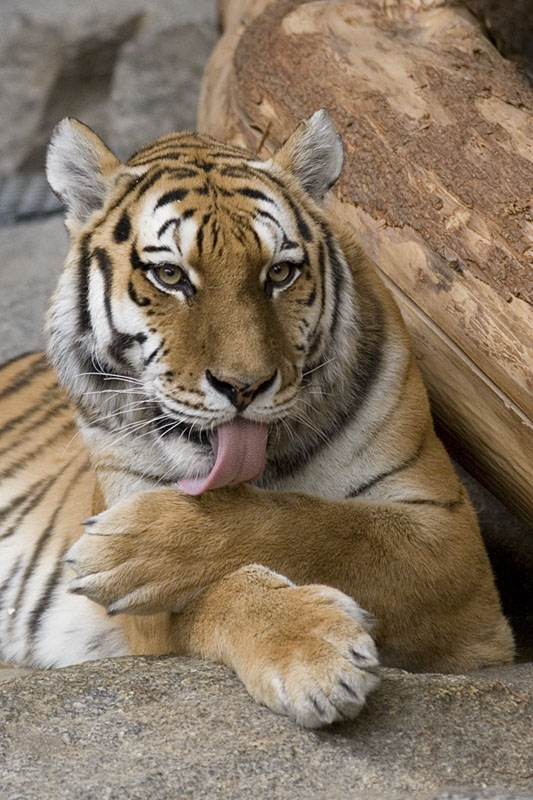
The tiger (Panthera tigris). Karnataka has around 10% of the tiger population in India

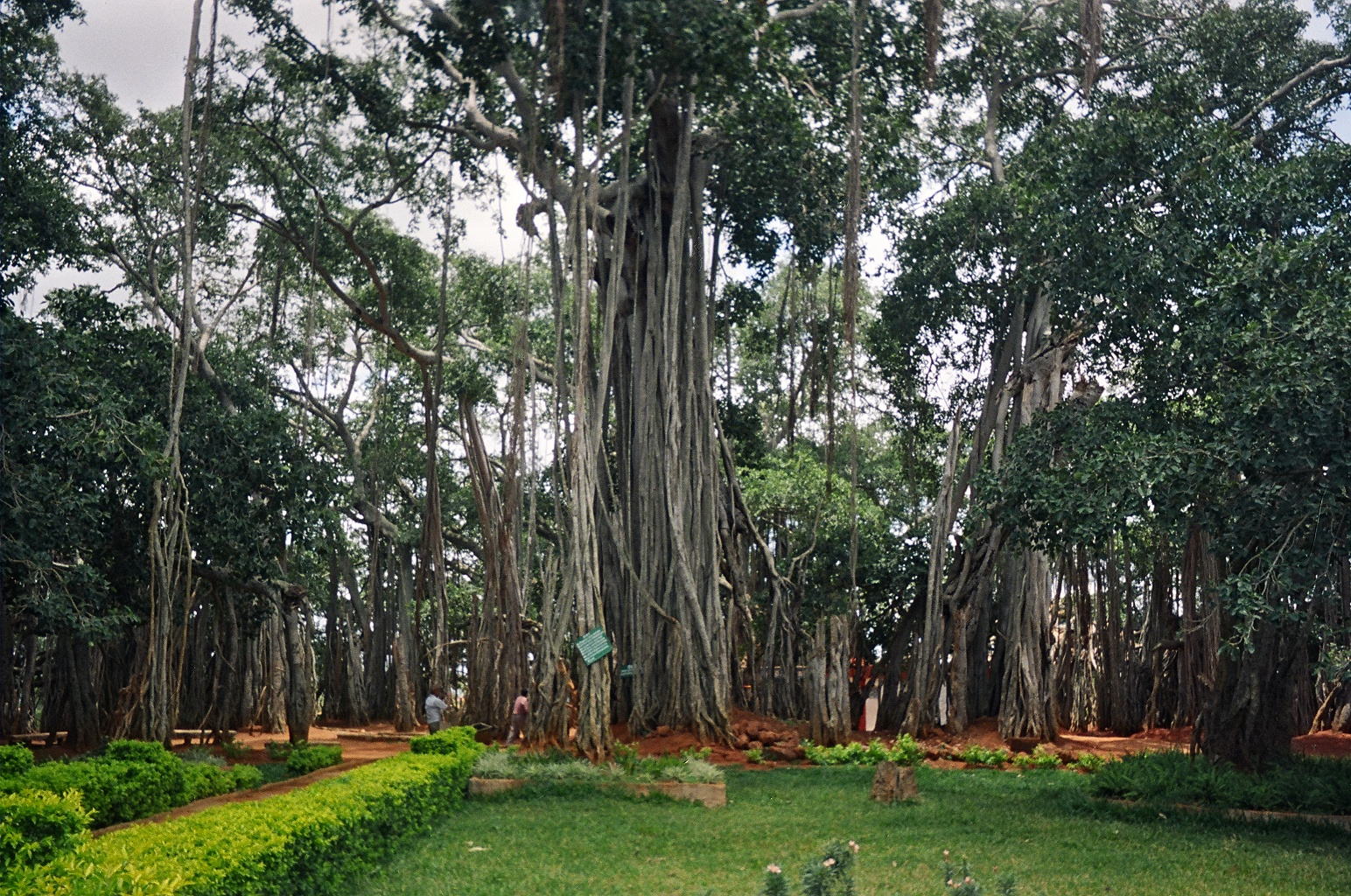
Dodda Alada Mara, a giant 400-year-old banyan near Bangalore

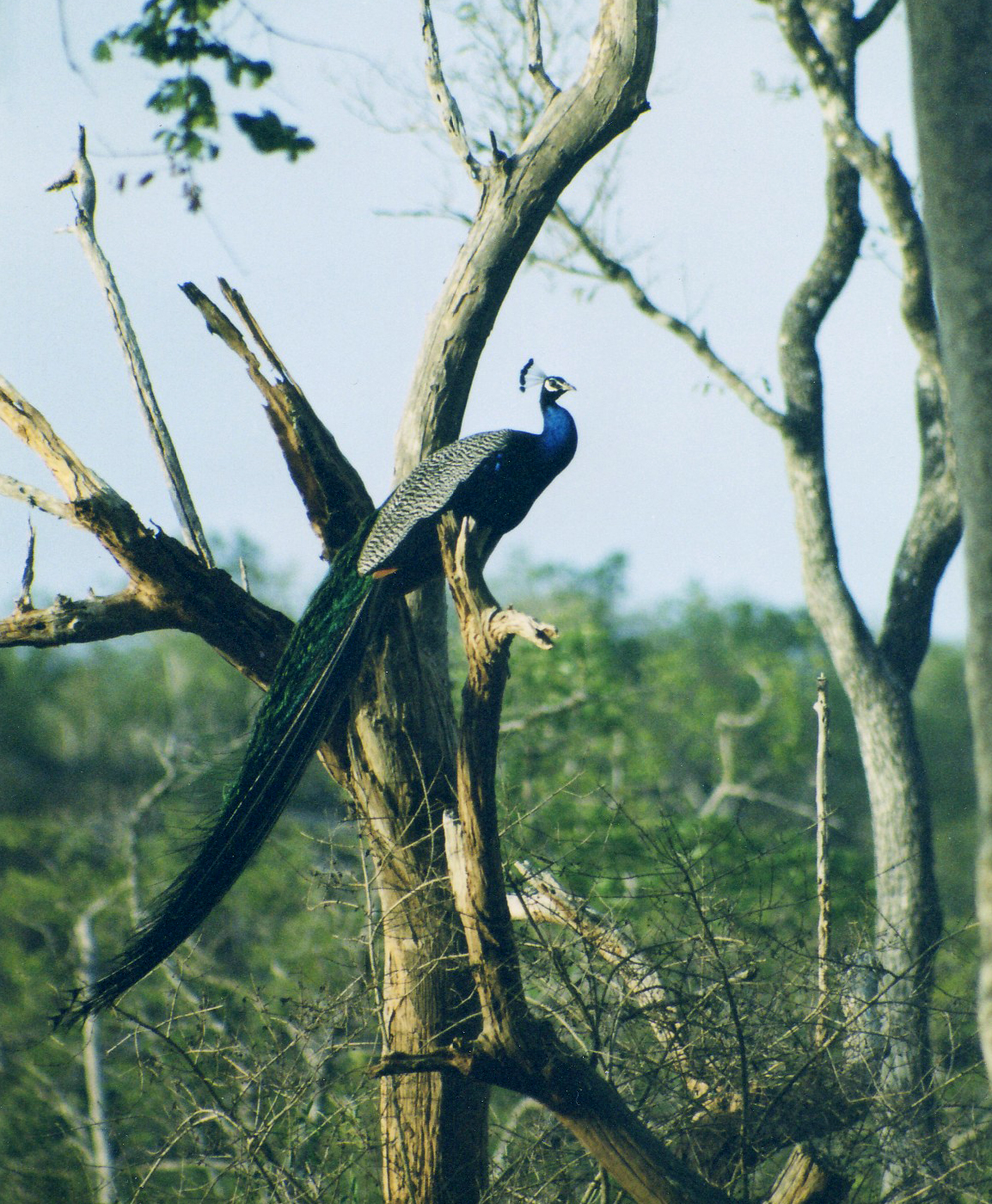
Peacock (Pavo cristatus) in Bandipur National Park

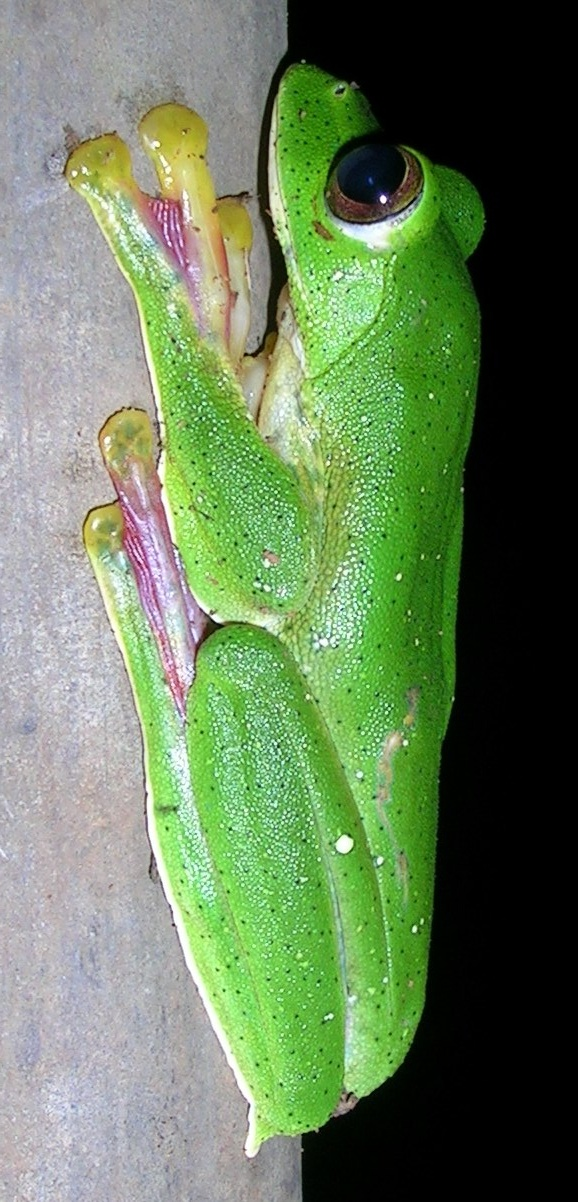
The Malabar gliding frog (Rhacophorus malabaricus) found in the Western Ghats

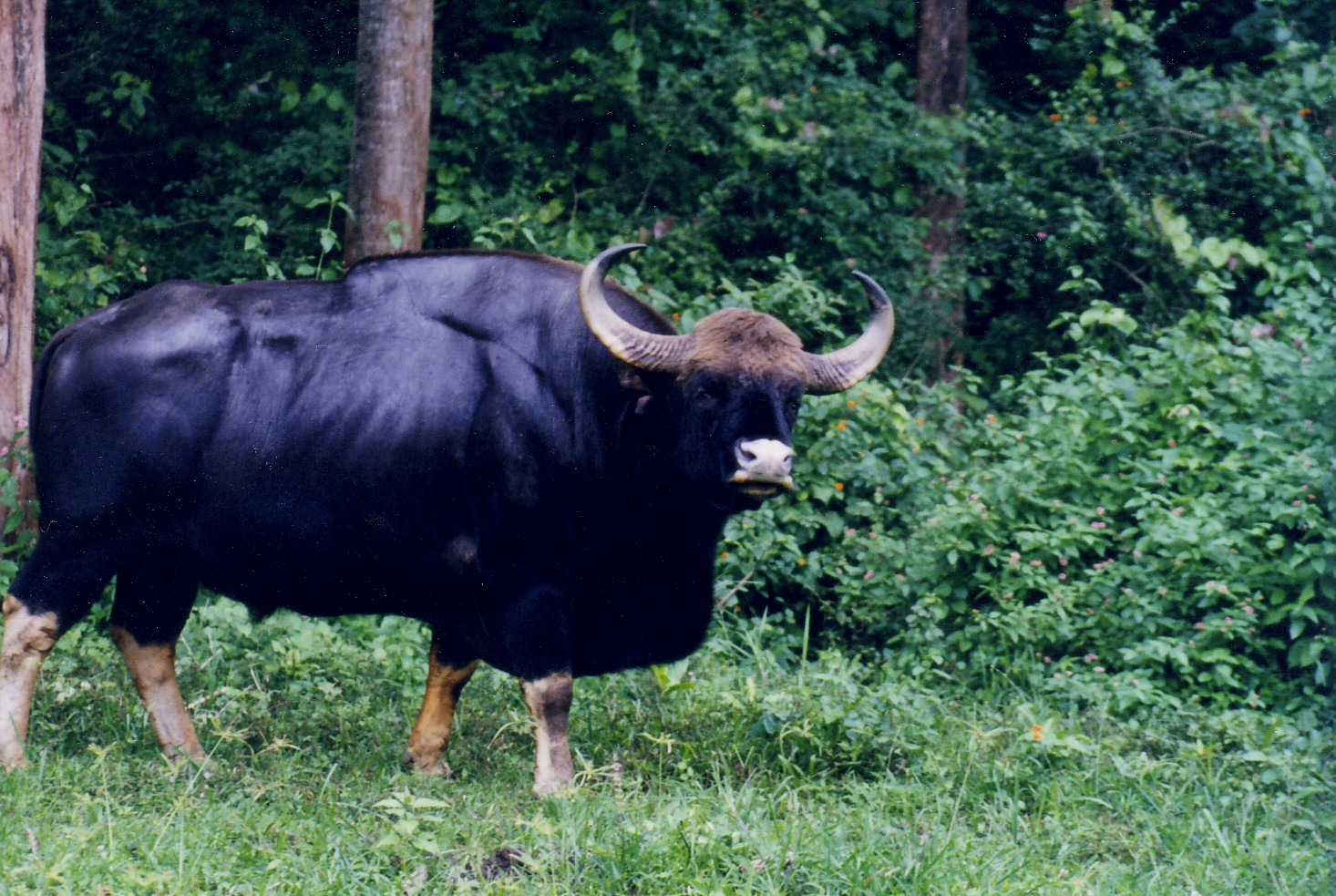
Male gaur (Bos gaurus) in Nagarahole National Park

=== Anshi National Park ===
This park is present in the Uttara Kannada district and spreads over an area of 250 km^{2}. The elevation varies from 27 to 937 metres (89 to 3,074 ft), and temperatures from 15.5 °C to 45 °C. Average annual rainfall is about 4,700 millimetres (185 in) .

- Flora: The area has semi-evergreen and evergreen forests. Some common tree species in the area are Calophyllum tomentosa, Calophyllum wightianum, Garcina cambogia, Garcina morealla, Knema attenuata, Hopea ponga, Tetrameles nudiflora, Alstonia scholaris, Flacourtia montana, Machilis macarantha, Carallia brachiata, Artocarpus hirsutus, Artocarpus lacoocha and Cinnamomum zeylanicum.
- Fauna: Mammals in the park include Indian elephant, gaur, wild boar, sambar, chevrotain, muntjac, chital, gray langur, bonnet macaque, slender loris, Bengal tiger, jungle cat, Indian leopard, leopard cat, small Indian civet, common mongoose, golden jackal, dhole, sloth bear, Malabar giant squirrel, grizzled giant squirrel, Indian giant flying squirrel, and Indian crested porcupine. King cobra, python, cobra, rat snake, viper and krait are among the snakes that inhabit the park. Interesting birds include the great hornbill, Malabar pied hornbill and Ceylon frogmouth.

=== Bandipur National Park ===
The park is within Gundlupet taluk of Chamarajanagar District covering over 800 km^{2} and adjoins the states of Tamil Nadu and Kerala. In 1973, Bandipur became one of the first of India's tiger reserves and became a part of Project Tiger. In 1977, an intention was declared under the Wildlife Protection Act to notify it as a national park.

- Flora: The scrub jungles towards the eastern limits of the park consist of stunted trees, interspersed with bushes and open grassy patches. Towards its north-western fringes, there is a gradual shift in the vegetation from open dry deciduous forests to tropical mixed deciduous forests. These diverse habitats support an enormous diversity of animal life.
- Fauna: The mammals found here are Indian elephant (Elephas maximus indicus), gaur (Bos gaurus), sambar (Cervus unicolor), chital or spotted deer (Axis axis), muntjac (Muntiacus muntjak) or barking deer, mouse deer (Moschiola indica), bonnet macaque (Macaca radiata), slender loris (Loris tardigradus), red giant flying squirrel (Petaurista petaurista), Bengal tiger (Panthera tigris), Indian leopard (Panthera pardus), common palm civet (Paradoxurus hermaphroditus), small Indian civet (Viverricula indica), sloth bear (Melursus ursinus), dhole or Asiatic wild dog (Cuon alpinus), golden jackal (Canis aureus), ruddy mongoose (Herpestes smithii), smooth-coated otter (Lutrogale perspicillata), Indian pangolin (Manis crassicaudata). Among the 230 species of birds identified, important groups include herons, storks, egrets, ducks, kites, eagles, falcons, quails, partridges, wildfowl, lapwings, sandpipers, pigeons, doves, parakeets, cuckoos, owls, nightjars, swifts, kingfishers, bee-eaters and munias. Reptiles like marsh crocodile (Crocodylus palustris), Indian pond terrapin, starred tortoise (Geochelone elegans), common Indian monitor (Varanus bengalensis), Indian chameleon (Chamaeleo zeylanicus), skinks (Mabuya spp.), geckos (Hemidactylus), common rat snake (Ptyas mucosus), Indian cobra (Naja naja), Russell's viper (Daboia russelli), common krait (Bungarus caeruleus), Indian python (Python molurus), checkered keelback, green whip snake, common Indian bronzeback (Dendrelaphis tristis) and trinket snake (Elaphe helena) are found here

=== Bannerghatta National Park ===
The park is in Bengaluru urban district and Kanakapura taluk of Bengaluru South district covers over 260.51 km^{2} of area. Elevation varies from 740 to 1,034 metres (2,428 to 3,392 ft), temperature from 20 to 35 °C and the average annual rainfall is 700 millimetres (28 in).

- Flora: The area has dry deciduous forests and thorny shrubs, with patches of moist[deciduous forests along the streams. Tree species in the park include Anogeissus latifolia, Schleichera , Terminalia tomentosa, Terminalia arjuna, Grewia tilaefolia, Santalum album, Shorea talura, Emblica officinalis, Vitex altissima, Wrightia tinctoria, Randia sp., Ziziphus sp. and Albizzia sp. Bamboos are common in the park, the dominant species being Dendrocalamus strictus. A small area of the park has plantations of Eucalyptus, Bauhinia purpurea, Samanea saman and Peltophorum pterocarpum.
- Fauna: Mammals in the park include Indian leopard, gaur, Indian elephant, golden jackal, fox, wild boar, sloth bear, sambar, spotted deer, barking deer, common langur, bonnet macaque, Indian crested porcupine and hare. A Bengal tiger was sighted in the park.

=== Kudremukh National Park ===
Spread over an area of 600.32 km^{2}, it encompasses regions in the districts of Dakshina Kannada, Udupi and Chikmagalur. Altitude varies from 134 to 1,892 metres (440 to 6,207 ft). The park has a pleasant climate, with temperatures ranging from 17 to 28 °C. Annual rainfall varies from 1,778 to 6,350 millimetres (70 to 250 in), with an average of 4,000 millimetres (157 in). The rivers Nethravati, Tunga and Bhadra are believed to originate here at Ganga Moola.

- Flora: The park has mostly evergreen and semi-evergreen forests. Shola grassland habitat is found at elevations above 1,400 metres (4,593 ft). Evergreen trees include Poeciloneuron indicum, Holigarna arnottiana, Artocarpus sp., Calophyllum sp., Alstonia scholaris, Canarium strictum, Syzygium cumini, Flacourtia montana, Symplocos spicata, Hopea parviflora, Mesua ferrea and Evodiaroxburghiana. There are also a few plantations of Eucalyptus, Casuarina and Acacia auriculiformis.
- Fauna: Mammals in the park include Bengal tiger, Indian leopard, dhole, golden jackal, lion-tailed macaque, common langur, sloth bear, gaur, sambar, spotted deer, barking deer, Malabar giant squirrel, Indian giant flying squirrel, Indian crested porcupine and mongoose. Reptiles are represented by snakes and tortoises. Bird species in the park include the Malabar trogon, great hornbill, Malabar whistling thrush and imperial pigeon.

=== Nagarahole National Park ===
Also known as Rajiv Gandhi (Nagarahole) National Park, the park gets its name from the Nagara Hole (Snake River in Kannada) which runs eastwards through its centre. Nagarahole river flows through the park before it joins the Kabini river that also acts as a boundary between Nagarahole and Bandipur. The park covers an area of about 575 km^{2}. The Wayanad Wildlife Sanctuary of Kerala adjoins to the Southeast.

- Flora: These forests are dominated by teak and rosewood. The eastern limits of the park consist of regenerating dry deciduous forests. The west region of the park contains tropical moist and semi-evergreen forests. Interspersed with these forests are swampy fallows called hadlus, which are dominated by grasses and are favoured grazing areas of many wild herbivores.
- Fauna: Some of the species of mammals found in this park are Indian elephant (Elephas maximus indicus), gaur (Bos gaurus), sambar (Cervus unicolor), chital or spotted deer or axis deer (Axis axis), muntjac or barking deer (Muntiacus muntjak), chevrotain or mouse deer (Moschiola indica), four horned antelope (Tetracerus quadricornis), giant fruit bat (Pteropus giganteus), Bengal tiger (Panthera tigris), Indian leopard (Panthera pardus), leopard cat (Felis bengalensis), jungle cat (Felis chaus), rusty spotted cat (Felis rubiginosa), common palm civet (Paradoxurus hermaphroditus), small Indian civet (Viverricula indica), sloth bear (Melursus ursinus), dhole or Asiatic wild dog (Cuon alpinus) and flying fox (Pteropus giganteus), the largest Indian bat. Among the 300 species of birds identified in this park include herons, storks, egrets, ducks, kites, eagles, falcons, partridges, quails, peafowl, owls, lapwings, sandpipers, pigeons, doves, parakeets, cuckoos, nightjars, swifts, kingfishers, bee-eaters, barbets, swallows, larks, woodpeckers, shrikes and orioles. Reptiles include marsh crocodile (Crocodylus palustris), Indian pond terrapin, star tortoise, common Indian monitor lizard (Varanus bengalensis), forest calotes, southern green calotes, skinks (Mabuya spp.), geckos, spectacled cobra, Russell's viper, common krait, Indian python (Python molurus), checkered keelback, green whip snake, common Indian bronzeback, flying snake, wolf snake and trinket snake.

== Wildlife sanctuaries ==
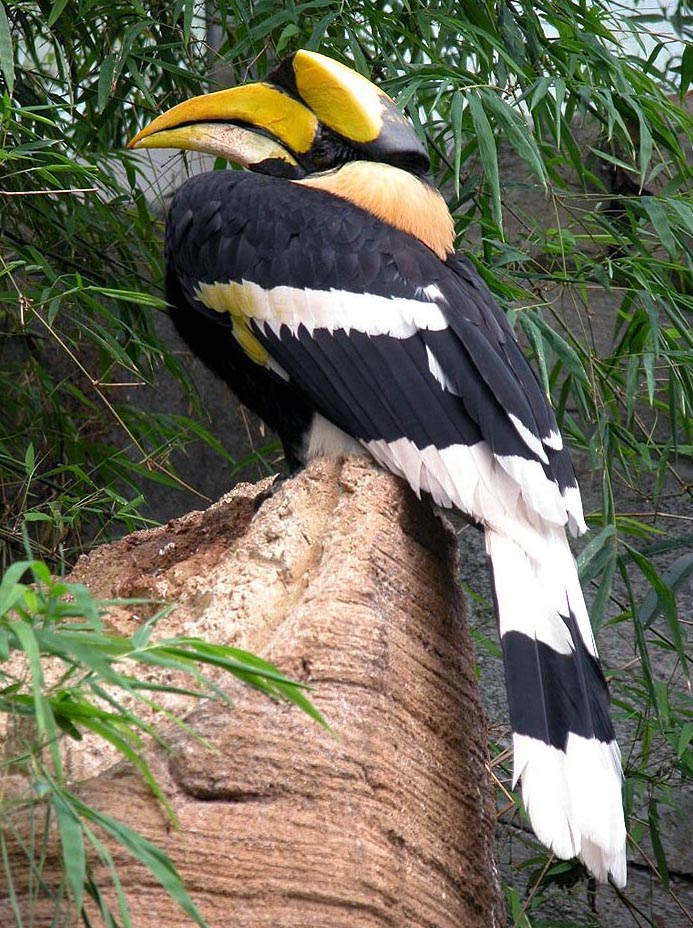
The great Indian hornbill (Buceros bicornis), found in the forests of Karnataka

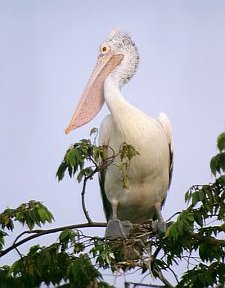
Spot-billed pelican, (Pelecanus philippensis), a bird found in the bird sanctuaries of Karnataka

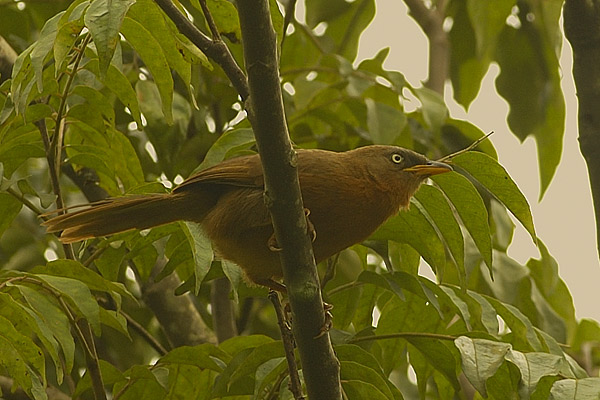
Rufous babbler (Turdoides subrufus) at Bhadra Wildlife Sanctuary

Karnataka has 19 wildlife sanctuaries:

- Kaveri Wildlife Sanctuary is spread over three districts; Chamarajanagar, Mandya and Ramanagara. The sanctuary was originally notified in 1987 with an area of about 510 km2 . Subsequently it was expanded by adding more forest areas in stages, and its present extent is 1,027 km^{2}. Cauvery wildlife division has two sub-divisions, namely, Hanur and Kanakapura sub-divisions, and consists of seven ranges, namely, Kothnur, Hanur, Cowdally, Gopinatham, Halagur, Sangam and Muggur ranges. The sanctuary provides a vital link between Bannerghatta National Park in the north and BRT Tiger Reserve and MM Hills Wildlife Sanctuary in the south. The area is drained by three rivers, namely, Cauvery, Arkavathi and Shimsha, along with their numerous rivulets. The forest is primarily of dry deciduous and scrub types, but a wide range of forest types including moist deciduous, semi-evergreen, evergreen, shola, riverine, Hardwickia forest, etc. are encountered at different altitudes. Important animals found in the sanctuary are tiger, elephant, leopard, bison, wild dog, sambar, spotted deer, barking deer, sloth bear, wild boar, common langur, bonnet macaque, giant squirrel, honey badger (ratel), chevrotain, kollegal ground gecko, varieties of reptiles and birds and many.
- Adichunchanagiri Wildlife Sanctuary, in Mandya district, is spread over 0.88 square kilometres (0.34 sq mi). It was created mainly for the conservation of peacocks. It also houses nearly 250 other species of birds.
- Arabithittu Wildlife Sanctuary is in Mysore district and is spread over 13.5 square kilometres (5.2 sq mi). This park consists of eucalyptus and sandalwood plantations. Leopard, fox and spotted deer are found here. Also around 230 species of birds have been observed here.
- Biligiriranga Swamy Temple Wildlife Sanctuary is in Chamarajanagar district and is spread over 539.58 square kilometres (208.33 sq mi). Some of the species of flora found here are Anogeissus latifolia, Grewia tilaefolia and Syzygium cumini. Mammals include elephants, tigers, leopards, sloth bear, gaur, barking deer and sambar. Among the 215 species of birds are the Nilgiri wood pigeon, Malabar whistling thrush, yellow-throated bulbul, peregrine falcon, rufous-bellied hawk-eagle. An endangered amphibian, Icthyophis ghytinosus has been reported in the sanctuary.
- Bhadra Wildlife Sanctuary is between Chikkamagaluru and Shimoga districts and is spread over 492.46 square kilometres (190.14 sq mi). Common species of flora include Lagerstromia lanceolata, Adina cordifolia and Careya arborea. Mammals include tiger, leopard, elephant, gaur, slender loris and pangolin. Among the bird species found here are ruby-throated bulbul, shama, Malabar whistling thrush and paradise flycatcher.
- Brahmagiri Wildlife Sanctuary is in Kodagu district and is spread over an area of 181.80 square kilometres (70.19 sq mi). The evergreen forests include species like Cinnamomum zeylancium, Cedrela toona and Alstonia scholaris. Bamboos are dominant and include species like Bambusa bambos and Dendrocalamus strictus. Mammals include elephant, gaur, tiger, jungle cat, bonnet macaque and Nilgiri marten. Also around 300 species of birds have been observed here: It is spread across the districts of Bangalore, Mysore and Mandya and is spread over 1,027.53 square kilometres (396.73 sq mi). Dry deciduous trees found in this park include species like Terminalia arjuna and Syzgium cumini. Animal species found in this park include leopard, elephant, sambar and common otter. This is also one of the last refuge of the highly endangered grizzled giant squirrel in Karnataka. Also around 300 species of birds have been observed here. This sanctuary is also famous for mahseer fish (Tor species).
- Dandeli Wildlife Sanctuary is in Uttara Kannada district and is spread over 475.02 square kilometres (183.41 sq mi). Common tree species found here are Dalbergia latifolia, Terminalia paniculata, T. tomentosa and Vitex altissima. Mammal species include elephant, gaur, wild boar, slender loris, Malabar giant squirrel and barking deer.
- Daroji Sloth Bear Sanctuary is in Bellary district and is spread over 82.72 square kilometres (31.94 sq mi). This sanctuary was mainly created for the conservation of sloth bears.
- Male Mahadeshwara Wildlife Sanctuary is spread over 906 square kilometres (349.8 sq mi), MM Hills wildlife sanctuary came to being on 7 May 2013. Contiguous with BRT Tiger Reserve and Cauvery Wildlife Sanctuary, the sanctuary boasts of tiger, elephant, leopard, dhole, sambar, barking deer and others. The sanctuary is in Chamarajanagar district, Kollegala taluk.
- Melkote Temple Wildlife Sanctuary is in Mandya district and is spread over 45.82 square kilometres (17.69 sq mi). An endangered species of flora, Cycas circinalis is found here. Mammal species include wolf, leopard, blackbuck and pangolin. Also around 230 species of birds have been observed.
- Mookambika Wildlife Sanctuary is in Udupi district and is spread over 370.37 square kilometres (143.00 sq mi). Some of the tree species found here are Dipterocarpus indicus, Calophyllum tomentosum and Hopea parviflora. An endangered species of climber Coscinium fenestratum has been recorded here. Slender loris, lion-tailed macaque, sambar and chital are some of the animals found here. The endangered cane turtle is also found here.
- Nugu Wildlife Sanctuary is in Mysore district and is spread over 30.32 square kilometres (11.71 sq mi). Common species of flora include Emblica officinalis, Santalum album and Dendrocalamus strictus. Mammals include elephant, gaur, leopard, spotted deer and common palm civet.
- Pushpagiri Wildlife Sanctuary is in Kodagu district and is spread over 102.59 square kilometres (39.61 sq mi). Some species of flora found here are Hopea parviflora, Heptapleurum capitatum, Xanthalis tomentosa and Ochlandra rheedii. Mammals include elephant, tiger, slender loris, Nilgiri marten and bonnet macaque. Around 230 species of birds have been observed. Bird species include great pied hornbill, Malabar trogon and Nilgiri blackbird.
- Ranibennur Blackbuck Sanctuary is in Haveri district and is spread over 119.00 square kilometres (45.95 sq mi). Eucalyptus is the dominant tree. Cassia fistula, Prosopis juliflora and Ziziphus mauritiana are also present. This sanctuary was created mainly for the conservation of blackbucks. This sanctuary is also a habitat for the endangered great Indian bustard.
- Sharavathi LTM Wildlife Sanctuary is in Shimoga district and is spread over 431.23 square kilometres (166.50 sq mi). Dipterocarpus indicus, Caryota urens and Dillenia pentagyna are some of the species of plants found here. Tiger, leopard, mouse deer, bonnet macaque and common langur are some of the animal species found here. Snakes are commonly found here. Paradise flycatcher, racket-tailed drongo and blue-throated barbet are some of the bird species found here.
- Shettihalli Wildlife Sanctuary is in Shimoga district and is spread over 395.60 square kilometres (152.74 sq mi). Cassia fistula, Kydia calycina and Wrightia tinctoria are some of the species of plants found here. Tiger, leopard, bonnet macaque and Malabar giant squirrel are some of the animal species found here.
- GendeKatte Biodiversity Park is a home to more than a hundred deer and various species of birds. The forest spread across 308 acres.
- Arasikere Sloth Bear Wildlife Sanctuary is a mountainous scrub forest also known as Nagpuri forest. Bears and Leopards population is the highlight of this forest.
- Someshwara Wildlife Sanctuary is in Udupi district and is spread over 88.40 square kilometres (34.13 sq mi). Machilus macrantha, Lophopetalum wightanium and Artocarpus hirsuta are some of the species of plants found here. Tiger, leopard, lion-tailed macaque and spotted deer are some of the animal species found here.
- Talakaveri Wildlife Sanctuary is in Kodagu district and is spread over 105.00 square kilometres (40.54 sq mi). Albizzia lebbek, Artocarpus lakoocha, Dysoxylum malabaricum and Mesua ferrea are some of the species of plants found here. Clawless otter, elephant, tiger, striped-necked mongoose and mouse deer are some of the animal species found here. Also around 300 species of birds have been observed here. Fairy bluebird, Malabar trogon and broadbill roller are some of the avian species found.
- Tungabhadra Otter Conservation Reserve is the country's first otter conservation reserve near Hampi.

== Bird sanctuaries ==
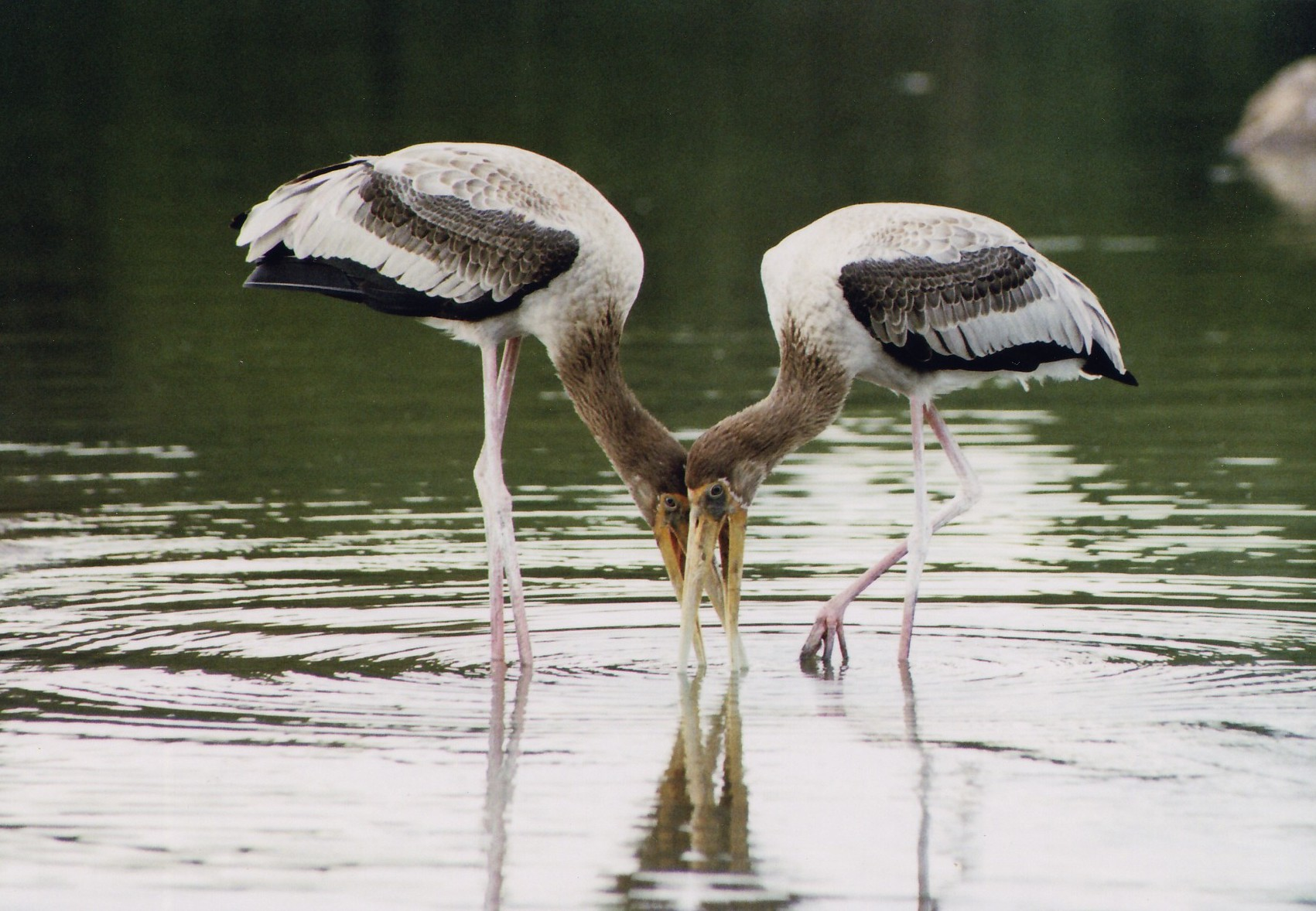
A pair of painted storks (Mycteria leucocephala) in Ranganathittu Bird Sanctuary

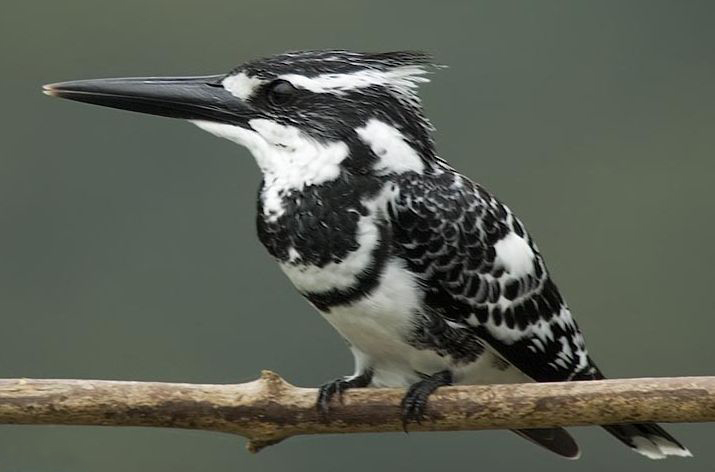
Pied kingfisher, (Ceryle rudis), in Ranganathittu Bird Sanctuary

- Attiveri Bird Sanctuary is in Uttara Kannada district and is spread over 2.23 km^{2}. White ibis, little cormorant, pied kingfisher, common grey hornbill are found here.
- Gudavi Bird Sanctuary is in Shimoga district and is spread over 0.73 km^{2}. The tree species that dominate this sanctuary are Vitex leucoxylon and Phyllanthus polyphyllus. 191 species of birds are recorded here including white ibis, pheasant-tailed jacana, purple moorhen and little grebe.
- Ranganathittu Bird Sanctuary is in Mandya district and is spread over 0.67 km^{2}. Among the tree species found here, is the unique Iphigenia mysorensis. Other tree species include Derris indica and Barringtonia racemosa. This sanctuary houses nearly 170 birds. Birds like cormorants, darter, white ibis, great stone plover, cliff swallow, spoonbills, lesser whistling teal roost here all through the year.
- Mandagadde Bird Sanctuary: It is near the little village Mandagadde which is 30 km from the Shimoga town and is based on a small island on the Tunga River. It is mainly visited by migratory birds like median egret (Egretta intermedia), the little cormorant (Microcarbo niger), and the darter or snake bird (Aninga nufa).
- Kaggaladu Heronry is in Tumkur district and is one of the largest painted stork sanctuaries in South India. Some of the birds that nest here are painted storks, grey herons, pelicans, black stilts and ducks.
- Kokrebellur Pelicanry is in the town of Kokkare Bellur in Mandya district and is a haven for avian species like grey or spot-billed pelican (Pelecanus philippensis) and painted stork (Mycteria leucocephala). In fact the word kokkare means stork in the Kannada language. Apart from pelicans and storks, 250 species of birds have been sighted here.
- Magadi Bird Sanctuary: Magadi Bird Sanctuary created at the Magadi tank, in Magadi village of Shirahatti Taluk, Gadag district. It is one of the biodiversity hotspots in North Karnataka. From Gadag it is 26 km, it is on Gadag-Bangalore Road, from Shirahatti it is 8 km, and from Lakshmeshwara 11 km. Bar-headed goose is one of the bird migrates to Magadi wetlands of Gadag district. Normally birds eat fish, amphibians, molluscs, snakes etc., but migratory birds eating agricultural produce is both interesting and curious too. Winter habitat is on cultivation, it feeds on barley, rice and wheat and damage crops.
- Bankapura Peacock Sanctuary is in Haveri district and spread over an area of 139.10 acres (0.5629 km^{2}). This sanctuary was created mainly for the conservation of peacocks.
- Bonal Bird Sanctuary is about 10 km from Shorapur city in Yadgir district.
- Ramadevarabetta Vulture Sanctuary is in Ramanagara and is home of the critically endangered long-billed vulture (Gyps indicus).
- Ghataprabha Bird Sanctuary is in Belgaum district and is spread over 20.78 square kilometres (8.02 sq mi). This sanctuary is known for migratory birds like demoiselle crane and European white stork.

== Dangers to flora and fauna ==
Flora and fauna in Karnataka are threatened. Issues include poaching, human–wildlife conflict, habitat destruction, pollution and introduction of invasive species.

=== Poaching ===
Despite the best efforts of conservation activists, poaching remains one of the serious problems affecting the flora and fauna in the state. Between 1997 and 2001, a 98 elephants were poached in Karnataka. Poaching has also affected the breeding of turtles like olive ridley on the beaches of Karnataka as well as otters on the river banks. Tigers are also another species that are threatened by poachers. Sandalwood, famed for its sculptures and its aroma, is frequently poached out of the forests of Karnataka. Teakwood, famed for furniture, is another species affected by this problem. Staff shortage, lack of adequate funds and unscientific anti-poaching camps are some of the reasons quoted for continued poaching activities.

=== Habitat destruction ===
Some of the activities that are causing a destruction of habitat of flora and fauna in Karnataka are:

- Construction of dams and reservoirs: Construction of dams causes widespread flooding of surrounding areas causing destruction of species that inhabit the area. They also affect riverine species like fishes and disrupt their normal habits. An example is the construction of the Linganamakki reservoir in Shimoga district that caused the extinction of the grass Hubbardia heptaneuron.Yettinahole project has led to destruction of forest,drying of river basins,disturbance in natural movement of wild animals in Western ghats area of Dakshina Kannada and Hassan districts.
- Destruction of forest land for agriculture and other purposes: Large tracts of forest land have been cleaned up for monoculture plantations of teak, coffee and rubber. This has led to the destruction of species that were dependent on the forest. An example of this is loss of habitats such as Myristica swamps and high altitude grasslands. In the dry zone, they have adversely affected several species dependent on large tracts of scrub such as the wolf and the great Indian bustard.
- Mining operations: Mining operations clear out large areas of land and cause destruction to the species dependent on them. An example is the Kudremukh Iron Ore Company Limited which mined iron ore within the boundaries of the protected Kudremukh National Park.

=== Human–wildlife conflict ===
Due to the loss of habitat, more and more species of fauna have started to venture into human habitation causing a conflict between humans and other animals. A typical species affected by this is the elephant which ventures out of the forest into human cultivations thereby eating or destroying the crops. In some cases, the elephants have also caused human deaths like an incident that happened in Hassan district where a villager was trampled to death. Precautionary measures (sometimes illegally) are taken by humans to prevent such mishaps like electric fencing have also led to disastrous consequences like electrocution of fauna.

=== Pollution ===
Release of industrial waste and human effluents into rivers have caused significant damage to species that reside in rivers and riverbanks. Air pollution is also a significant cause of concern in metros like Bangalore where it has been found that air pollution is discolouring foliage including those of ornamental plants. A comparison of the lichen flora of the garden Lal Bagh in Bangalore has revealed that 18 of the 22 species noted in 1980 were no longer present in 1997. Pollution in rivers like Kabini, Kaveri and Ghataprabha has caused sharp reduction in populations of bird species, including beneficial insectivorous birds like drongos, as well as honeybees.

=== Invasive species ===
Introduction of new species into a habitat has caused serious consequences to the existing species. A typical example is the introduction of the African catfish (Clarias gariepinus) in the lakes and rivers of Karnataka. This is a carnivorous fish and has caused serious damage to the indigenous fauna. Weeds like Eupatorium, Lantana and Parthenium have invaded large tracts of land causing destruction. An increase in Eupatorium is attributed as one of the causes for the spread of the deadly Kyasanur forest disease (which has a morbidity rate of 10%) among humans since it harbours tick populations that are vectors for this disease. Eucalyptus plantations in the Ranibennur blackbuck sanctuary have seriously harmed the extremely rare great Indian bustard.

== Conservation efforts ==
Various conservation activities are in progress to protect the biodiversity present in Karnataka. These activities are mostly done by the Forest Department of the State of Karnataka and other voluntary organisations.

=== Relocation of human population ===
The presence of human habitation within the core area of reserved forests poses many problems like human–wildlife conflict and destruction of habitat due to agriculture and cattle grazing. Systematic efforts have been made to relocate some of this population into proper zones outside the protected area. An example is the relocation of some villagers from Bhagawathi and Nassehalla habitations within the Kudremukh National Park to safer regions outside it.

=== Usage of technology ===
New scientific methods are being used to protect the flora and fauna. Some of these are:

- Usage of satellites to detect forest fires so that they can easily be extinguished.
- Radio tracking of animals and usage of techniques like remote camera sampling to estimate the animal population.
- Installation of wireless stations and using wireless sets for easy communication among individuals involved in field trips and anti-poaching activities.

=== Staff empowerment ===
It is highly important to keep up the morale of forest wardens and other staff members involved in anti-poaching activities and field trips. It is also necessary to keep them up-to-date on the technology and wildlife related laws. The following steps were implemented to address this issue:

- Field kits were provided to the staff consisting of boots, rain gear and uniforms.
- Conservation related award programs were announced to boost the morale of the staff.
- Training programs were undertaken for the staff in the use of firearms against poachers, field craft and Indian wildlife laws

== Recently discovered species ==
Many areas of Karnataka, especially in the forests of Malnad region are unexplored and new species of flora and fauna are discovered periodically. Some of the new species of flora discovered in Karnataka include Paracautleya bhatii (a ginger) and Isachne veldkampii (a grass), both of which were discovered near Manipal in Udupi district. Two species of algae, Cosmarium bourrellyi and Cosmarium desikacharyi were discovered in a paddy field in Belgaum. Other new species of flora discovered in Karnataka include Isoetes udupiensis (a pteridophyte) and Pisolithus indicus (a fungus).

Some of the new species of fauna discovered include two species of ants, Dilobocondyla bangalorica which was discovered on the campus of Indian Institute of Science, Bangalore and Discothyrea sringerensis which was discovered near Sringeri. Three new species of frogs; Philautus luteolus, Philautus tuberohumerus and Nyctibatrachus petraeus have been discovered in Karnataka. Explorations in the Sharavathi river have yielded new fish species like Batasio sharavatiensis (a bagrid catfish), Schistura nagodiensis and Schistura sharavathiensis. Another fish species, Puntius coorgensis has been discovered near Bhagamandala in the Kaveri river. Some other species of fauna discovered in Karnataka include two species of whiteflies, Distinctaleyrodes setosus and Aleurocanthus arecae and a caecilian, Gegeneophis madhavai. Explorations in the soil around the Linganamakki reservoir has revealed eleven new species of earthworms.

== Endangered species ==
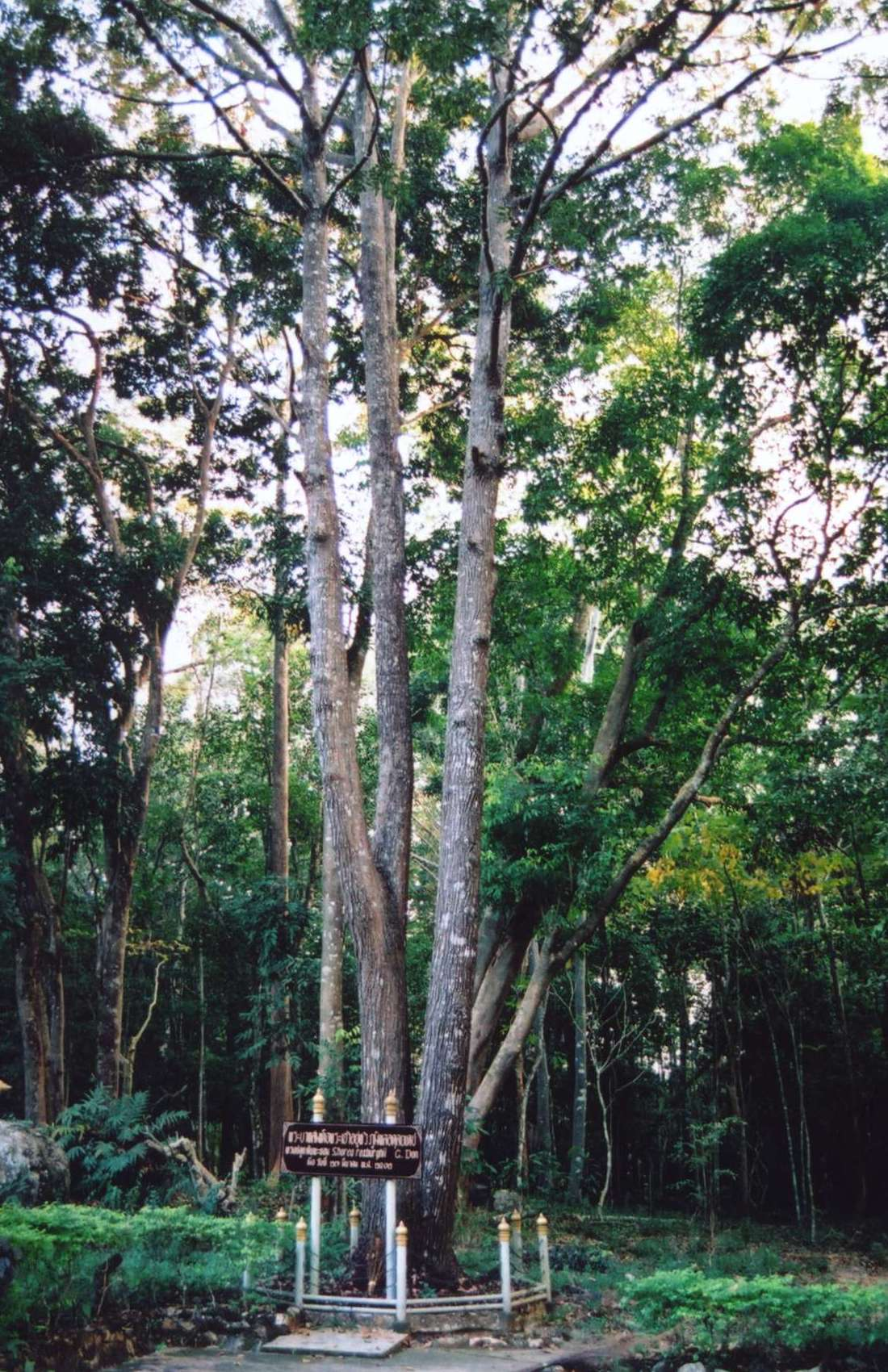
Shorea roxburghii, an endangered rainforest tree found in Karnataka

Karnataka is the home of few critically endangered species of flora that include evergreen trees like Dipterocarpus bourdilloni, Hopea erosa and Hopea jacobi, Croton lawianus (a small tree) and Pinnatella limbata (a type of moss). Some of the critically endangered species of fauna found in Karnataka include Gyps indicus (the Indian vulture) and two species of frogs, Indirana gundia (found only in Gundia range, Sakleshpur) and Micrixalus kottigeharensis (found only near Kottigehara, Chikkamagaluru district).

Some of the threatened species of flora include evergreen trees like Cynometra bourdillonii, Cynometra travancorica, Hopea glabra, Hopea parviflora, Hopea ponga, Hopea racophloea, Shorea roxburghii and Tarenna agumbensis and flowering plants like Glochidion pauciflorum, Glochidion tomentosum, Ixora lawsoni and Syzygium stocksii. Other endangered trees found in Karnataka include Isonandra stocksii, Kingiodendron pinnatum, Maesa velutina, Myristica magnifica, Rapanea striata and Flacourtia latifolia (synonym Xylosma latifolia).

Endangered species of fauna found in Karnataka include the Bengal tiger, Indian elephant, lion-tailed macaque, olive ridley turtle and dhole, the Indian wild dog. Many endangered species of amphibians are found here including frogs, Indirana brachytarsus, Microhyla sholigari, Minervarya sahyadris, Nyctibatrachus aliciae, Nyctibatrachus hussaini, Nyctibatrachus sanctipalustris, Philautus charius, Philautus wynaadensis, Ramanella mormorata and Rhacophorus lateralis and a toad, Bufo beddomii. Other endangered species of fauna include Hipposideros hypophyllus (the Kolar leaf-nosed bat) and Pseudomulleria dalyi (a mollusc).
