= List of forestry ministries =

A forestry ministry (also called a forestry agency, forestry department, or forest service) is a high, often cabinet-level government ministry charged with forestry. The ministry is often headed by a minister for forestry. Specific duties may relate to forest conservation, management, reforestation, education, forest protection, wildfire management, and related areas.

== Forestry ministries by country ==
(Where a national forestry agency, forestry department, forest administration or parastatal corporation exists as a high-level agency within a multi-purpose ministry, it has been added to this list within parentheses.)

Country		Office	Head
Albania		Ministry of Environment, Forests and Water Administration	Minister of Environment, Forests and Water Administration
Australia		Department of Agriculture, Fisheries and Forestry	Minister of Agriculture, Fisheries and Forestry
Azerbaijan		Ministry of Ecology and Natural Resources	Minister of Ecology and Natural Resources
Bangladesh		Ministry of Environment and Forest	Minister of Environment and Forestry
Brunei		Ministry of Primary Resources and Tourism (Forestry Department)	Minister of Primary Resources and Tourism
Bulgaria		Ministry of Agriculture and Food	Minister of Agriculture and Food
Burma		Ministry of Environmental Conservation and Forestry	Minister of Environmental Conservation and Forestry
Cambodia		Ministry of Agriculture, Forestry and Fisheries	Minister of Agriculture, Forestry and Fisheries
Canada		Natural Resources Canada (Canadian Forest Service)	Minister of Natural Resources
Chile		Ministry of Agriculture (National Forest Corporation)	
China		State Forestry and Grassland Administration (formerly State Forestry Administration)	Director of the State Forestry and Grassland Administration
Colombia		Ministry of Environment and Sustainable Development	Minister of Environment and Sustainable Development
Czech Republic		Ministry of Agriculture	Minister of Agriculture
Denmark		Ministry of Environment (Danish Forest and Nature Agency)	Minister of Environment
DRC		Ministry of Environment, Nature Conservation and Tourism	Minister of Environment, Nature Conservation and Tourism
Equatorial Guinea		Ministry of Agriculture and Forestry	
Ethiopia		Ministry of Environmental Protection and Forestry	
Finland		Metsähallitus	
France		Ministry of Agriculture, Food, Fisheries, Rural Affairs and Regional Planning (National Forests Office)	Minister of Agriculture, Food, Fisheries, Rural Affairs and Regional Planning
Georgia		Ministry of Environment and Natural Resources Protection	Minister of Environment and Natural Resources Protection
Germany		Federal Ministry of Food, Agriculture and Consumer Protection	Minister of Food, Agriculture and Consumer Protection
India	Nationwide	Ministry of Environment, Forest and Climate Change (Indian Forest Service) (ICFRE)	Minister of Environment, Forest and Climate Change
India	Kerala	Kerala Forest Department	Minister for Forests of the states
India	Karnataka	Department of Forest (Karnataka)	Minister for Forests of the states
India	Tamil Nadu	Tamil Nadu Forest Department	Minister for Forests of the states
India	West Bengal	West Bengal Forest Department	Minister for Forests of the states
India	Jharkhand	Department of Forest, Environment & Climate Change (Jharkhand)	Minister for Forests of the states
India	Maharashtra	Maharashtra Forest Department	Minister for Forests of the states
Indonesia		Ministry of Forestry	Minister of Forestry
Iran		Ministry of Agriculture Jihad (Research Institute of Forests and Rangelands)	Minister of Agriculture Jihad
Ireland		Department of Agriculture, Food and the Marine	Minister for Agriculture, Food and the Marine
Isle of Man		Department of Environment, Food and Agriculture	Minister for Environment, Food and Agriculture
Israel		Ministry of Agriculture and Rural Development	
Italy		Ministry of Agricultural, Food and Forestry Policies	
Japan		Ministry of Agriculture, Forestry and Fisheries	
Kenya		Kenya Forest Service	
Laos		Ministry of Agriculture and Forestry	Minister of Agriculture and Forestry of Laos
Lithuania		Ministry of Environment	Minister of Environment of Lithuania
North Macedonia		Ministry of Agriculture, Forestry and Water Economy	Minister of Agriculture, Forestry and Water Economy
Malaysia		Ministry of Energy and Natural Resources	Minister of Energy and Natural Resources
Mexico		Secretariat of Environment and Natural Resources (National Forestry Commission)	Secretary of the Environment
Netherlands		Ministry of Infrastructure and the Environment	Minister of Infrastructure and the Environment
New Zealand		Ministry for Primary Industries; Department of Conservation	
Nicaragua		Ministry of the Environment and Natural Resources	Minister of the Environment and Natural Resources
Nigeria		Federal Ministry of Agriculture	
North Korea		Ministry of Forestry	Minister of Forestry
Norway		Ministry of Agriculture and Food (Statskog)	Minister of Agriculture and Food
Pakistan		Ministry of Environment	Minister of Environment
Papua New Guinea		Papua New Guinea Forestry Authority	Ministry for Forestry
Peru		Ministry of Environment	Minister of Environment
Philippines		Department of Environment and Natural Resources (Forest Management Bureau)	Secretary of Environment and Natural Resources
Poland		Ministry of Environment	Minister of Environment
Portugal		Ministry of Agriculture, Forestry and Rural Development	Minister of Agriculture, Forestry and Rural Development
Romania		Ministry of Environment and Forests	Minister of Environment and Forests
Russia		Ministry of Natural Resources and Environment (Federal Forestry Agency)	Minister of Natural Resources and Environment
South Africa		Department of Agriculture, Forestry and Fisheries	Minister of Agriculture, Forestry and Fisheries
South Korea		Ministry of Agriculture, Food and Rural Affairs (Korea Forest Service)	
South Sudan		Ministry of Agriculture and Forestry	
Spain		Ministry of Agriculture, Food and Environment	Minister for Agriculture, Food and Environment
Sri Lanka		Ministry of Environment and Natural Resources (Department of Forest Conservation)	
Sweden		Ministry of Enterprise, Energy and Communications	Minister for Enterprise, Energy and Communications
Taiwan		Ministry of Agriculture (Forestry and Nature Conservation Agency)	
Tanzania		Ministry of Natural Resources and Tourism	Minister of Natural Resources and Tourism
Thailand		Ministry of Natural Resources and Environment (Royal Forest Department)	Minister of Natural Resources and Environment
Turkey		Ministry of Agriculture and Forestry	Minister of Agriculture and Forestry
United Kingdom	Nationwide	Department for Environment, Food and Rural Affairs (Forestry Commission)	Secretary of State for Environment, Food and Rural Affairs
United Kingdom	Northern Ireland	Department of Agriculture, Environment and Rural Affairs (Forest Service Northern Ireland)	Minister of Agriculture, Environment and Rural Affairs
United Kingdom	Scotland	Environment and Forestry Directorate (Forestry and Land Scotland and Scottish Forestry)	Cabinet Secretary for Rural Affairs, Land Reform and Islands
United Kingdom	Wales	Rural Affairs Directorate (Natural Resources Wales)	Cabinet Secretary for Rural Affairs
United States	Nationwide	United States Department of Agriculture (United States Forest Service)	United States Secretary of Agriculture
United States	Puerto Rico	Puerto Rico Department of Natural and Environmental Resources	Secretary of Natural and Environmental Resources of Puerto Rico
Venezuela		Ministry of Environment and Natural Resources	Minister of Environment and Natural Resources
Vietnam		Ministry of Agriculture and Rural Development (Vietnam Administration of Forestry)	Minister of Agriculture and Rural Development

== See also ==
- Central African Forest Commission
- Directorate-General for Agriculture and Rural Development (EC)
- European Forest Institute
- Food and Agriculture Organization
- International Tropical Timber Organization
- International Union for Conservation of Nature
- International Union of Forest Research Organizations
- List of agriculture ministries
- List of environmental ministries
- List of supranational environmental agencies
