= Bird sanctuaries and conservation reserves in Karnataka =

Reserves in the Indian state

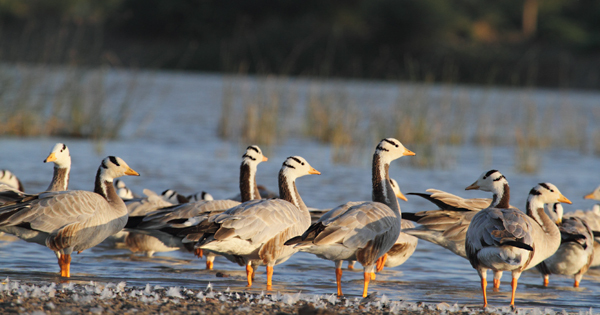
Bar-headed Geese in Magadi lake

Karnataka is a state in India with rich archaeological and ecological heritage. The total geographical area of Karnataka is 191,976 square kilometres (74,122 sq mi) of which forest area is 37,550 square kilometres (14,500 sq mi) (19.58%).

Karnataka state has 5 Tiger Reserves, 30 wildlife sanctuaries and 15 conservation reserves.

Following is the list of Protected Areas (PAs) for Birds in Karnataka.

== Bird sanctuaries ==
- Ranganathittu , Mandya district.
- Adichunchanagiri Peacock Wildlife Sanctuary, Mandya district.
- Attiveri Bird Sanctuary, Uttara Kannada & Dharwad district.
- Gudavi Bird Sanctuary, Shimoga district.
- Ramadevarabetta Vulture Sanctuary, Ramanagara district.
- Mandagadde Bird Sanctuary in Shimoga district 11
- Bonal Bird Sanctuary in yadagiri

== Bird conservation reserves ==
- Bankapura Peacock Conservation Reserve, Haveri District.
- Hornbill Conservation Reserve, Dandeli, Uttara Kannada District.
- Magadi Kere Conservation Reserve, Gadag District.
- Ankasamudra Bird Conservation Reserve, Hagari Bommanahalli taluk, Vijayanagara District.
