= C. lawianus =

C. lawianus may refer to

- Coscinodon lawianus, a species of moss endemic to Antarctica
- Croton lawianus, a species of tree endemic to southern India
