= Male Mahadeshwara Wildlife Sanctuary =

Protected wildlife sanctuary in Karnataka, India

- M.M. wildlife sanctuary
- IUCN category IV (habitat/species management area)
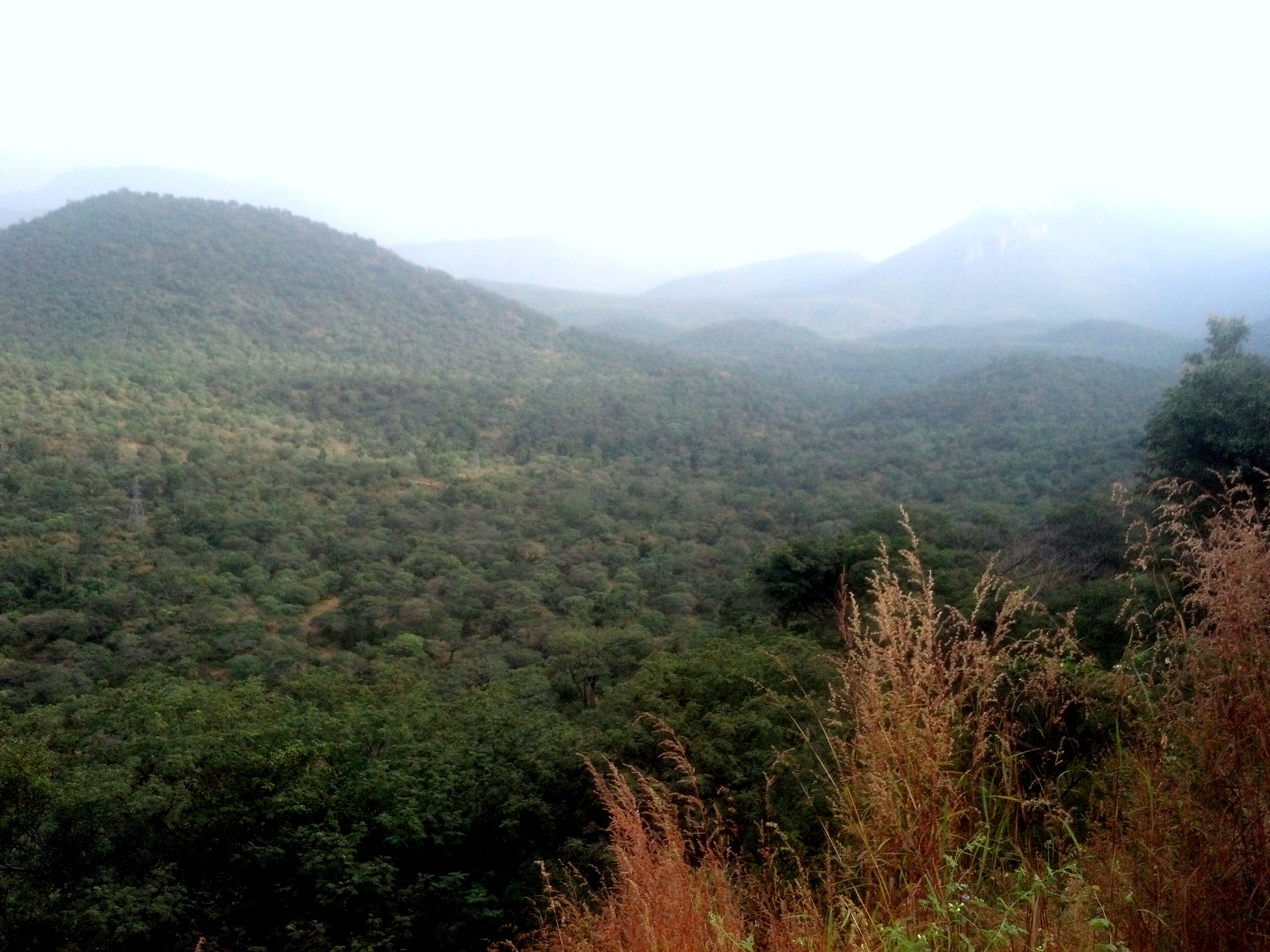
- A view of Male Mahadeshwara Wildlife Sanctuary

- Location within Karnataka Location within India
- Interactive map of Male Mahadeshwara Wildlife Sanctuary
- Location: Chamarajanagar district, Karnataka, India
- Coordinates: 11.962°N 77.442°E
- Area: 906.187 km^{2} (349.881 sq mi)
- Established: 2013
- Governing body: Kollegal Wildlife Division, Karnataka Forest Department

Male Mahadeshwara Wildlife Sanctuary is a wildlife sanctuary in the Eastern Ghats and is located in the state of Karnataka in India. It is named after the presiding deity "Lord Male Mahadeshwara" of the famed Male Mahadeshwara Hills located within the sanctuary. The sanctuary lies in the Chamarajanagar district of Karnataka. It is at a distance of 140 km (87 mi) from Mysore and 210 km (130 mi) from Bangalore.

Male Mahadeshwara Wildlife Sanctuary was established in 2013 with an area of 906.187 km^{2} (349.881 sq mi) out of the total area of 1,224 km^{2} (473 sq mi). The sanctuary is pending notification as a tiger reserve.

The sanctuary is part of a contiguous tiger habitat, located very close to the tri-junction of the states of Karnataka, Kerala and Tamil Nadu. The sanctuary has Cauvery Wildlife Sanctuary (Karnataka) to its North and East, Sathyamangalam Tiger Reserve (Tamil Nadu) to its South, and Biligirirangaswamy Temple Tiger Reserve (Karnataka) to its West. MM wildlife sanctuary has few anti poaching camps within its designated area.

== Flora ==
The predominant forest type of the sanctuary is dry and moist deciduous forests. As per research reports published, Lantana has invaded substantial areas around Male Mahadeshwara Hills.

== Fauna ==
The Indian Elephant (Elephas maximus) inhabits the sanctuary. After the creation of the sanctuary in 2013, the Bengal tiger (Panthera tigris tigris) population has been steadily increasing.

Kollegal ground gecko (Cyrtodactylus collegalensis) was discovered in this region in 2013.

The sanctuary also hosts gaur (Bos gaurus), wild boar (Sus scrofa), Indian leopard (Panthera pardus), dhole, spotted deer (Axis axis), barking deer (Muntiacus muntjak), sambar (Cervus unicolor), four-horned antelope (Tetracerus quadricornis), black-naped hare (Lepus nigricollis), chevrotain, common langur, bonnet macaque and honey badger.
