= Jharkhand State Pollution Control Board =

Jharkhand pollution control board

- झारखण्ड राज्य प्रदूषण नियंत्रण पर्षद्

Agency overview
- Formed: 15 December 2001; 24 years ago
- Jurisdiction: Government of Jharkhand
- Headquarters: HEC, Dhurwa, Ranchi, Jharkhand, India - 834004
- Minister responsible: Hemant Soren, Minister of Forest, Environment & Climate Change, Government of Jharkhand
- Agency executive: Rajeev Lochan Bakshi, Chairman
- Parent agency: Department of Forest, Environment & Climate Change, Government of Jharkhand
- Website: jspcb.org.in

The Jharkhand State Pollution Control Board (JSPCB) is a statutory body to monitor, control and prevent pollution in the state of Jharkhand. It operates under the Department of Forest, Environment & Climate Change, Government of Jharkhand.

JSPCB also issues No Objection Certificates (NOCs) to industries and businesses that comply with environmental regulations and has the authority to penalise those found violating pollution control norms.

== History ==
JSPCB was established in the year 2001 under the Water (Prevention and Control of Pollution) Act, 1974 to oversee environmental protection in the state. It began operations on 15 December 2001 with a chairman, members and a member secretary. The Board implements laws related to water, air and environmental protection and maintains offices and laboratories across Jharkhand to carry out its functions.
