= Melkote Temple Wildlife Sanctuary =

Wildlife sanctuary in Karnataka, India

- IUCN category IV (habitat/species management area)
- Location within Karnataka Location within India
- Interactive map of Melkote Temple Wildlife Sanctuary
- Location: Mandya district, Karnataka, India
- Nearest city: Melukote
- Coordinates: 12.700°N 76.662°E
- Area: 49.82 km^{2} (19.24 sq mi)
- Established: 17 June 1974
- Governing body: Department of Forest (Karnataka)

Melkote Temple Wildlife Sanctuary is a protected area situated in the Mandya district of Karnataka, India. Established on June 17, 1974, it was primarily created to provide a refuge for the Indian wolf. The sanctuary is named after the historic Melkote pilgrimage town and its prominent temples, which border the protected zone.

== Geography ==
The sanctuary covers an area of 49.82 square kilometres and is divided into two non-contiguous blocks Mudibetta and Narayandurga.

The terrain of the sanctuary is predominantly rocky with an elevation ranging from 800 to 1127 metres. The highest peak is Gavikallu Betta.

== Flora and Fauna ==
The sanctuary's vegetation is classified as tropical dry deciduous and scrub forest.

=== Flora ===
A botanical highlight is the presence of Cycas swamyi, a rare and endangered gymnosperm endemic to this region. Other significant flora include Sandalwood (Santalum album).

=== Fauna ===
- Mammals other than the wolf, it hosts leopards, sloth bears, and striped hyenas.
- Birds Recognized as an Important Bird Area (IBA), it hosts nearly 200 species, including the vulnerable Yellow-throated bulbul.
