= Department of Forest, Environment & Climate Change (Jharkhand) =

Department of the Government of Jharkhand

- वन, पर्यावरण एवं जलवायु परिवर्तन विभाग

Department overview
- Jurisdiction: Government of Jharkhand
- Headquarters: Van Bhawan, Doranda, Ranchi, Jharkhand
- Minister responsible: Hemant Soren, Minister in charge
- Department executives: Aboobacker Siddique P, IAS, Secretary; Ashok Kumar, PCCF & HoFF
- Website: Official Website

The Department of Forest, Environment & Climate Change is a department of the Government of Jharkhand. It is responsible for the management and conservation of forests and wildlife, regulation of environmental protection measures and the implementation of climate change policy in the state. The department also oversees afforestation, biodiversity conservation, and sustainable management of natural resources.

== Ministerial Team ==
The Department is headed by the Cabinet Minister for Forest, Environment & Climate Change, who is supported by senior Indian Administrative Service (IAS) officers. The current minister in charge is Hemant Soren, while the present Secretary of the department is Aboobacker Siddique P, an IAS officer.

== See also ==
- Government of Jharkhand
- Jharkhand State Pollution Control Board
- Ministry of Environment, Forest and Climate Change
- Palamau Tiger Reserve
