= Glochidion zeylanicum var. tomentosum =

Conservation status
- Endangered (IUCN 2.3)

Scientific classification
- Kingdom: Plantae
- Clade: Embryophytes
- Clade: Tracheophytes
- Clade: Angiosperms
- Clade: Eudicots
- Clade: Rosids
- Order: Malpighiales
- Family: Phyllanthaceae
- Genus: Glochidion
- Species: G. zeylanicum
- Variety: G. z. var. tomentosum

Trinomial name
- Glochidion zeylanicum var. tomentosum (Dalzell) Trimen (1885)

Synonyms
- Synonymy: Agyneia hirsuta Miq. (1859); Bradleia hirsuta Roxb. (1832); Bradleia mollis Steud. (1840); Diasperus arnottianus (Müll.Arg.) Kuntze (1891); Diasperus hirsutus (Roxb.) Kuntze (1891); Diasperus tomentosus (Dalzell) Kuntze (1891); Glochidion arnottianum Müll.Arg. (1863); Glochidion bifarium Royle; Glochidion dasyphyllum K.Koch (1853); Glochidion dasyphyllum var. iriomatense Hurus. (1954); Glochidion hirsutum (Roxb.) Voigt (1845); Glochidion hongkongense var. puberulum Chakrab. & M.Gangop. (1989); Glochidion molle Hook. & Arn. (1837), nom. illeg.; Glochidion tomentosum Dalzell (1851) (basionym); Glochidion tomentosum var. talbotii Hook.f. (1887); Glochidion zeylanicum var. talbotii (Hook.f.) Haines (1921); Phyllanthus arnottianus (Müll.Arg.) Müll.Arg. (1865); Phyllanthus hirsutus (Roxb.) Müll.Arg. (1865); Phyllanthus tomentosus (Dalzell) Müll.Arg. (1865); Phyllanthus zeylanicus var. tomentosus (Dalzell) Chakrab. & N.P.Balakr. (2009)

Species of flowering plant

Glochidion zeylanicum var. tomentosum is a variety of flowering plant in the family Phyllanthaceae. It is native to tropical and subtropical Asia, ranging from India and Sri Lanka to the Himalayas, Myanmar, Thailand, and southern China to Taiwan and the Ryukyu Islands.
