= Department of Forest (Karnataka) =

Government department responsible for forest and wildlife management in Karnataka

Department of Forest, Karnataka
Agency overview
- Jurisdiction: Government of Karnataka
- Headquarters: Bengaluru, Karnataka
- Minister responsible: Eshwara Khandre, Minister for Forest, Ecology & Environment
- Agency executive: Ms. Meenakshi Negi, IFS, Principal Chief Conservator of Forests (Head of Forest Force)
- Parent agency: Government of Karnataka
- Website: aranya.gov.in

The Department of Forest, Karnataka also known as the Karnataka Forest Department, is a department of the Government of Karnataka responsible for the protection, conservation, and management of forests and wildlife in the state of Karnataka, India.

== History and legal foundation ==
The department operates under the legal framework provided by the Karnataka Forest Act, 1963 (Act No. 5 of 1964).

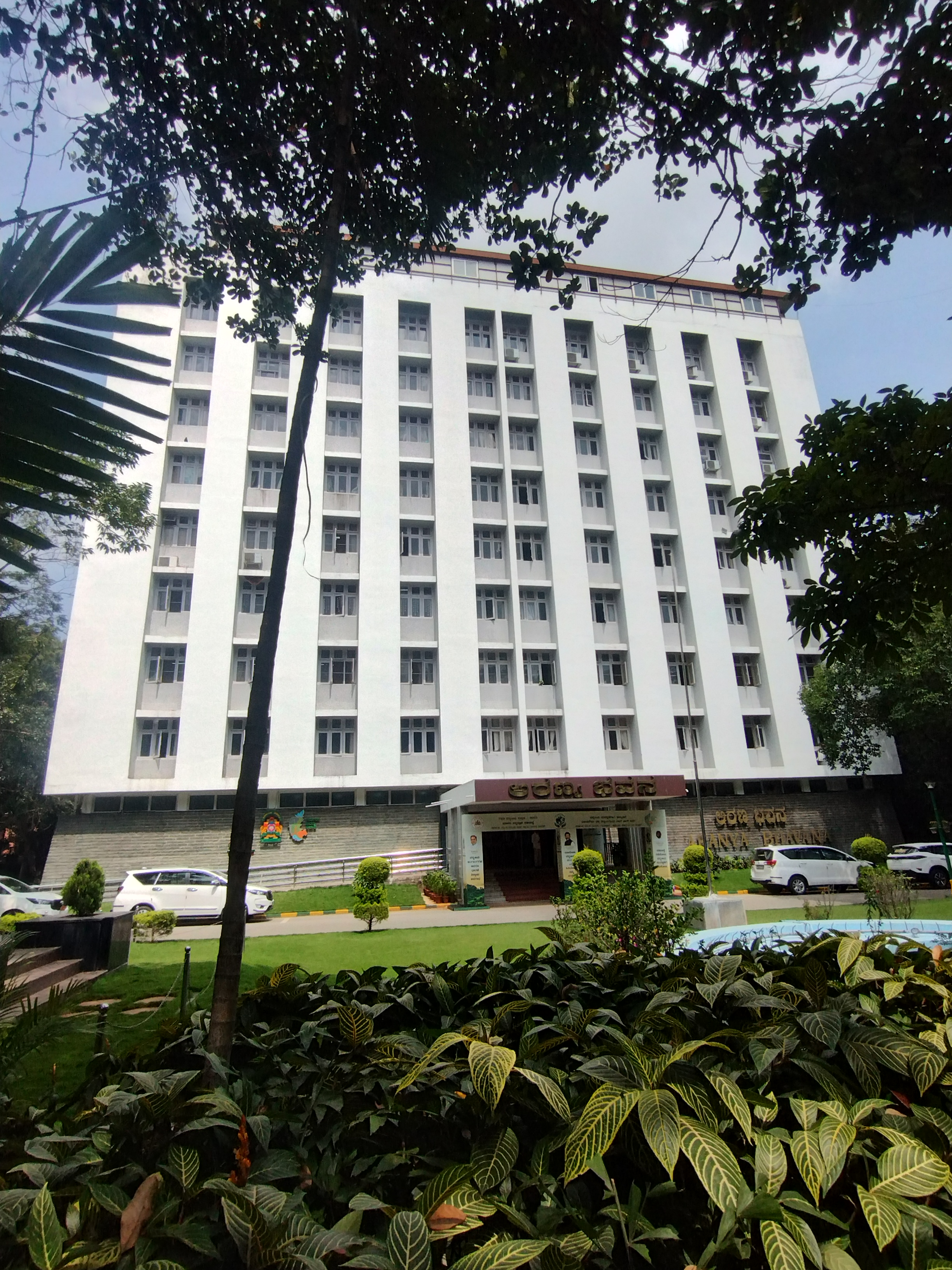
Aranya Bhavan, Bangalore in 2025

== Functions and responsibilities ==
The department handles several key areas:

- Prevention of deforestation, forest encroachment, and wildlife trafficking.
- Management and expansion of protected areas including tiger reserves, wildlife sanctuaries, and national parks.
- Conducting afforestation and reforestation drives.
- Regulating and promoting eco-tourism.
- Mitigating human-wildlife conflict.
- Enforcement of environmental laws and regulations.

=== Wildlife crime prevention ===
The department has brought technology into its enforcement work. In 2023, it started the 'Garudakshi', an online First Information Report (FIR) system to track and report wildlife crimes. A centralized wildlife crime management system was also created to coordinate data across the state.

=== Land protection and anti-encroachment drives ===
One of the department's main jobs is finding and taking back forest land that has been illegally occupied. In a big 2024 operation, the department got back 120 acres of prime forest land in the Bengaluru Rural district, worth over ₹4,000 crore, from real estate developers. The department often ends up in court fights over land ownership, like the case involving land in Kadugodi, Bengaluru, where it decided to appeal a decision to the Supreme Court of India. It also acts on orders from political leaders to investigate encroachment, as seen when the Forest Minister ordered action against illegal allocation in the Seebi forest area.

=== Conservation and wildlife management ===
The department takes care of wildlife health and monitoring within its protected areas. This includes giving medical care to injured animals, like a tiger in Bandipur Tiger Reserve that seemed to have been hurt in a fight with another tiger. It also runs conservation programs, like joint 'anti-snare drives' around the Bannerghatta National Park to find and remove traps set for wild animals.

Part of its work involves dealing with human settlements within protected areas. The department has worked to move villages like the Sheribikanahalli hamlet from the core area of the Chincholi Wildlife Sanctuary, giving rehabilitation packages to the residents.

=== Tourism management ===
The department controls tourism in protected areas to reduce disturbance to wildlife. It has created rules for tourism in and around the Bandipur Tiger Reserve, bringing in ways to control vehicle traffic and visitor behavior. It also approves development projects near forested areas, like approving a ropeway at Jog Falls after environmental review.

=== Afforestation Initiatives ===
The department runs large tree planting programs. In one such program in 2023, it worked with a non-governmental organization to plant one million saplings across the state.

=== Policy and regulatory role ===
The department helps make conservation policy for ecologically sensitive regions. It has proposed strict new state-level limits on converting forest land within the biodiversity-rich Western Ghats region of Karnataka. The department has also worked to simplify sandalwood policies to make them more accessible. Its regulatory power extends to commercial activities, as seen when it filed an FIR against the producers of a film for allegedly cutting down trees from a protected reserve for set construction.

== Public engagement and initiatives ==
The department runs public awareness campaigns. In a notable move, the state government named former Indian cricket team captain Anil Kumble as the 'Forest and Wildlife Ambassador' for Karnataka. It has also created institutions like the Sandalwood Museum in Mysuru to teach the public about the history and conservation of the valuable species.

The department has also explored new projects to generate revenue for its conservation activities, such as a plan to treat and sell water from the Thippagondanahalli (TG Halli) reservoir.

== Challenges ==
Despite its wide-ranging responsibilities, the department faces operational challenges, including a shortage of personnel. A 2024 report showed that the department had only 42% of its approved field staff strength, which hurts its anti-poaching and forest protection efforts.

The department also faces complex policy challenges, such as debates on whether to issue more transit permits for legal sawmills as a way to increase state revenue and undermine timber smuggling networks.

Grant of permission to Yettinahole project in the middle of virgin evergreen forests of Western ghats at Karnataka state resulting in large scale destruction of forest (trees), pollution of water, disturbance to the paths of wild animals has been criticized by environmentalists

== See also ==
- Forestry in India
- Wildlife of India
- List of protected areas of Karnataka
- Bandipur National Park
- Nagarhole National Park
- Western Ghats
