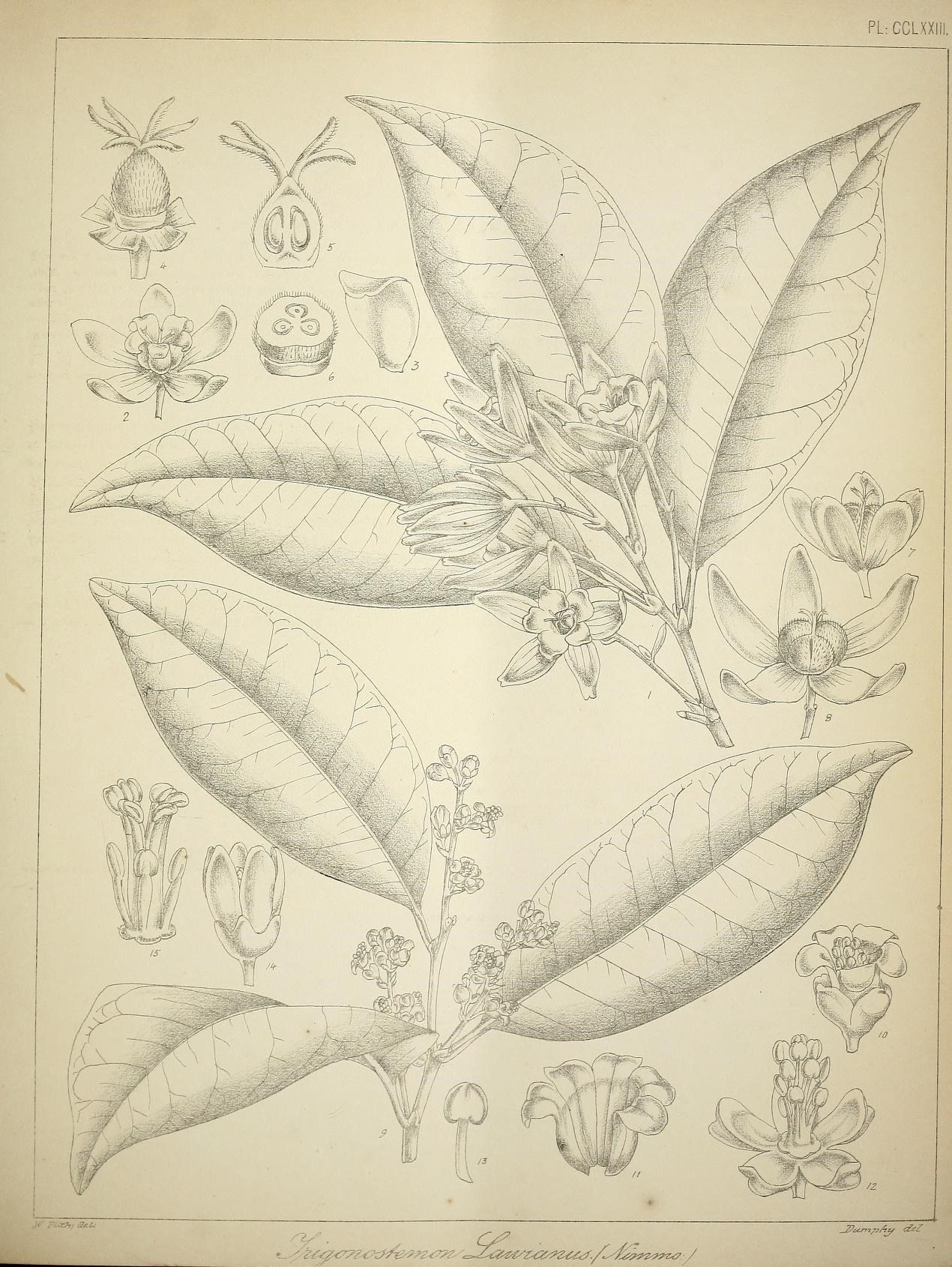

Conservation status
- Critically Endangered (IUCN 2.3)

Scientific classification
- Kingdom: Plantae
- Clade: Embryophytes
- Clade: Tracheophytes
- Clade: Spermatophytes
- Clade: Angiosperms
- Clade: Eudicots
- Clade: Rosids
- Order: Malpighiales
- Family: Euphorbiaceae
- Genus: Croton
- Species: C. lawianus

Binomial name
- Croton lawianus Nimmo

Synonyms
- Trigonostemon lawianus (Nimmo) Müll.Arg.; Tritaxis glabella var. lawiana (Nimmo) R.Y.Yu & Welzen

= Croton lawianus =

Species of flowering plant

Croton lawianus is a species of the family Euphorbiaceae. It is a tree native to Karnataka and Maharashtra in western India. It is known from the Bababudan Hills, where it grows in stunted montane forest.
