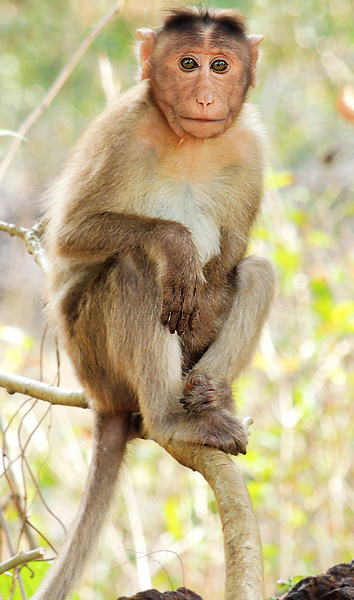
- Bonnet macaque in Mangaon, Maharashtra, India

Conservation status
- Vulnerable (IUCN 3.1)

Scientific classification
- Kingdom: Animalia
- Phylum: Chordata
- Class: Mammalia
- Order: Primates
- Family: Cercopithecidae
- Genus: Macaca
- Species: M. radiata

Binomial name
- Macaca radiata (É. Geoffroy, 1812)
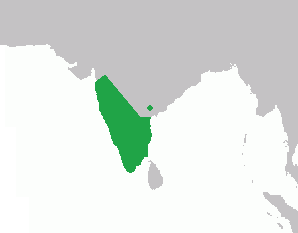
- Bonnet macaque range

Synonyms
- diluta Pocock, 1931

= Bonnet macaque =

Species of Old World monkey

The bonnet macaque (Macaca radiata), is a macaque species endemic to south India. Its distribution is limited by the Indian Ocean on three sides and the Godavari and Tapti rivers. Land use changes in the last few decades have resulted in changes in its distribution boundaries with the rhesus macaque, raising concern for its conservation status in the wild.

The bonnet macaque is diurnal, arboreal, and terrestrial. It can live up to 35 years in captivity.

The bonnet macaque feeds on fruits, true nuts, seeds (culinary "nuts"), flowers, invertebrates and cereals. In southern India, this macaque has a commensal interaction with humans, feeding on food given by humans and raiding farms and houses.

== Etymology ==
The name "bonnet macaque" has been derived from the species unique and distinctive head pattern. This pattern of hair growth radiates from the center of its crown, creating a visual resemblance of a "bonnet" or a "cap" on the head of the species.

== Taxonomy ==
The bonnet macaque was first described by Étienne Geoffroy Saint-Hilaire in 1812 who proposed the name Cercocebus radiatus. It was subordinated to the genus Macaca by Martin Hinton and Robert Charles Wroughton in 1921. Two subspecies have been described:

- M. r. radiata, dark-bellied bonnet macaque, occurs in southern and western India between the Tapti River, Palni Hills and Timbale. In the 16th century it was introduced to the Mascarene Islands.
- M. r. diluta, pale-bellied bonnet macaque, occurs in the states of Kerala and Tamil Nadu, from the southern coast north to Kambam at the base of the Palani Hills and east of Puducherry. It is smaller and has a paler coat colour with a seemingly longer and yellower head of hair.

== Distribution and habitat ==
The bonnet macaque is a diurnal and arboreal species that resides in trees. It defends its marked territory in the trees that it settles in, primarily fig trees near human civilizations or tall trees with enough leaves to feed on.

Bonnets are native to and distributed throughout the Indian peninsula. It has been estimated that the population of bonnet macaques in India (where they are native to) is approximately 170,000. It is believed that 81,000 bonnets live in Karnataka, 64,000 in Andhra Pradesh, 16,000 in Tamil Nadu and finally 11,000 live in Kerala.

The bonnet macaque is found primarily in southern India and occupies a wide range of habitats which include forests and human-dominated environments. Environments of the species include forests, roadsides, temples, villages, and urban settings. When compared with more habitat-specialized primates, this species displays a higher tolerance for habitat modification as well as the presence of humans.

== Description ==
The bonnet macaque has a cap-shaped whorl on the top of their heads that spreads outward from the center. The fur on their bodies can be either be dark brown or yellow. Despite these colors, the ears of the bonnet macaque are black. Females generally have redder faces when they are gestating or lactating. Males have a head-body length of 51.5–60 cm (20.3–23.6 in) with a 51–69 cm (20–27 in) tail and weigh 5.4–11.6 kg (12–26 lb); females are 34.5–52.5 cm (13.6–20.7 in) with a 48–63.5 cm (18.9–25.0 in) tail and weigh 2.9–5.5 kg (6.4–12.1 lb).

Forest-dwelling bonnets are generally smaller than the bonnets that thrive in forests.

== Behavior and ecology ==
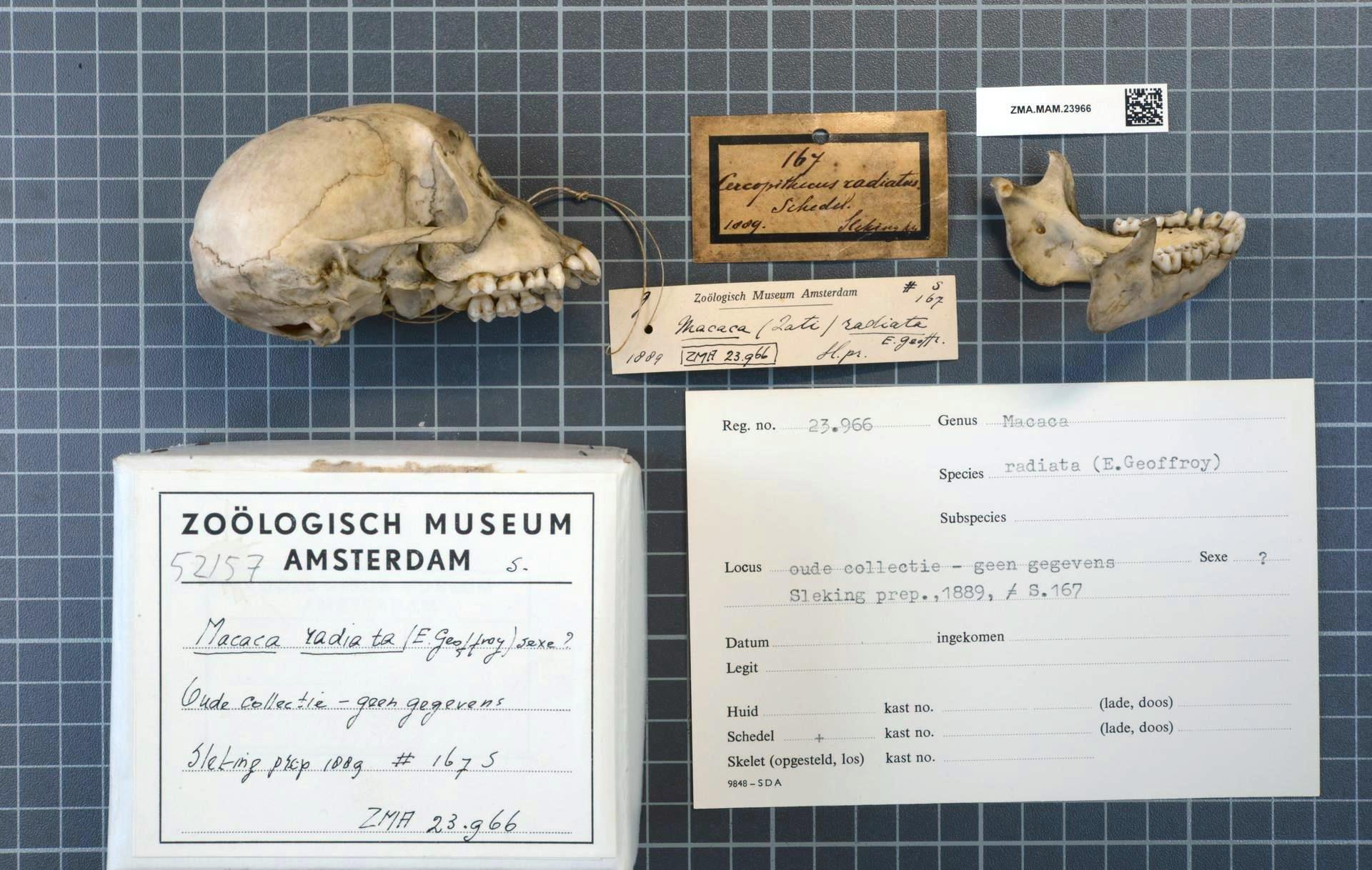
Skull and jawbone (Naturalis Biodiversity Center)

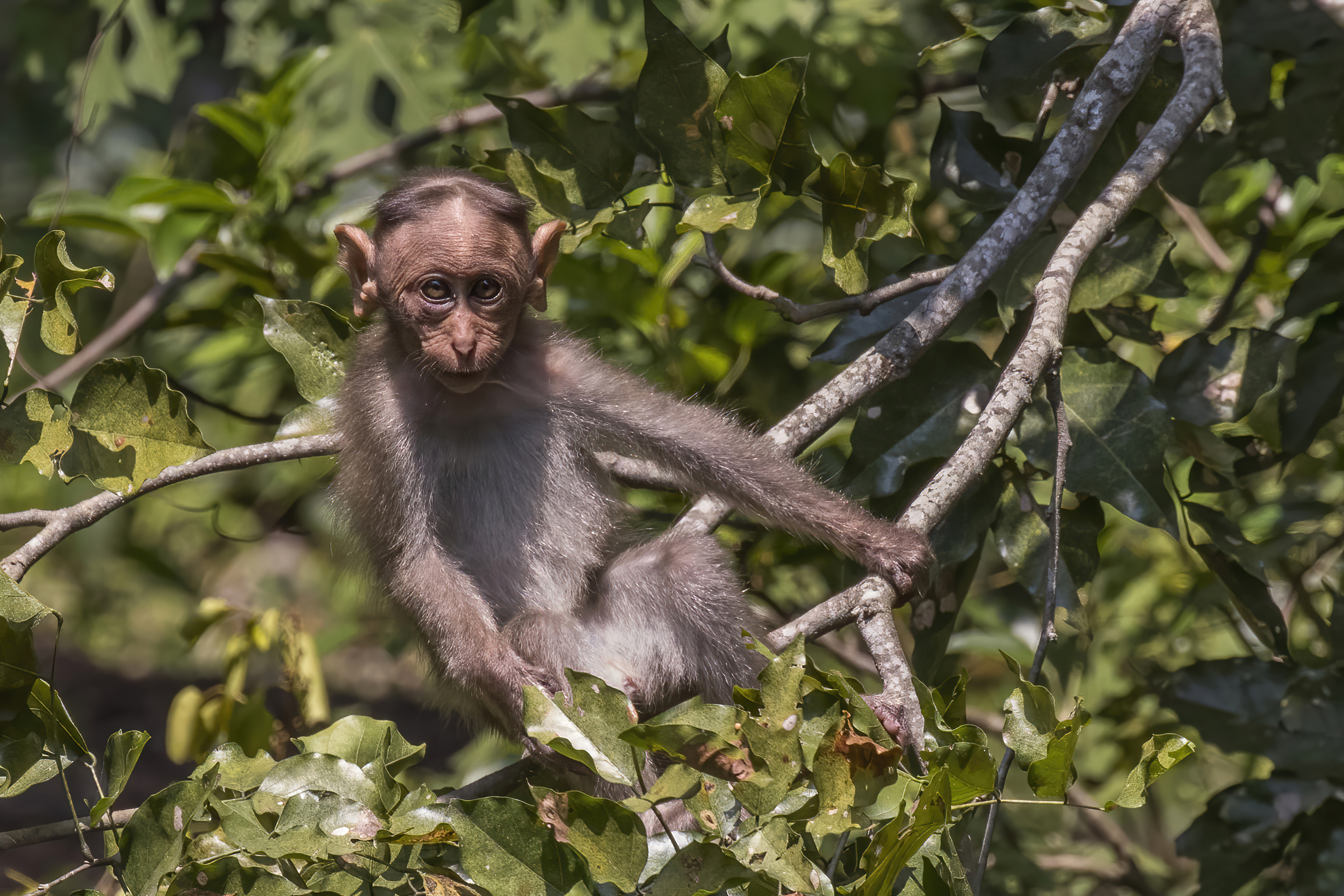
Juvenile

The bonnet macaque has a very wide range of gestures and behaviors, which can be easily differentiated. Lip-smacking is one of the most common affiliative behaviors, where one individual may open and close its mouth in rapid succession, with its tongue between its teeth and its lips pressing against each other, giving an audible sound. A grimace is the most common gesture of fear or submission that a subordinate shows to a dominant individual during aggressive encounters. It consists of pulling back its upper lip, showing its upper teeth. It also has distinct alarm calls for predators such as pythons and leopards.

=== Communication ===
Bonnet macaques that are living in the presence of humans show flexible and conditional signaling behaviors. Research conducted in southern India focused on communicative behaviors produced during interactions that were goal-oriented, specifically involving the gain of food. Several features differentiate these signals from incidental behavior such as directing signals toward a specific recipient, using signals only when the recipient is attentive, repeating signals when the first initial attempt was unsuccessful, and continuing the signal until the individual has received a response in return. These communicative gestures involve combinations of gestures, body orientation, and eye behavior. Furthermore, signaling behavior. occurs most often in human-dominated environments such as temples, roadside areas, and urban settings. The structure and frequency of these signals vary depending on the context and the expected outcome the individual wants to gain, indicating that they have behavioral flexibility.

=== Social structure ===
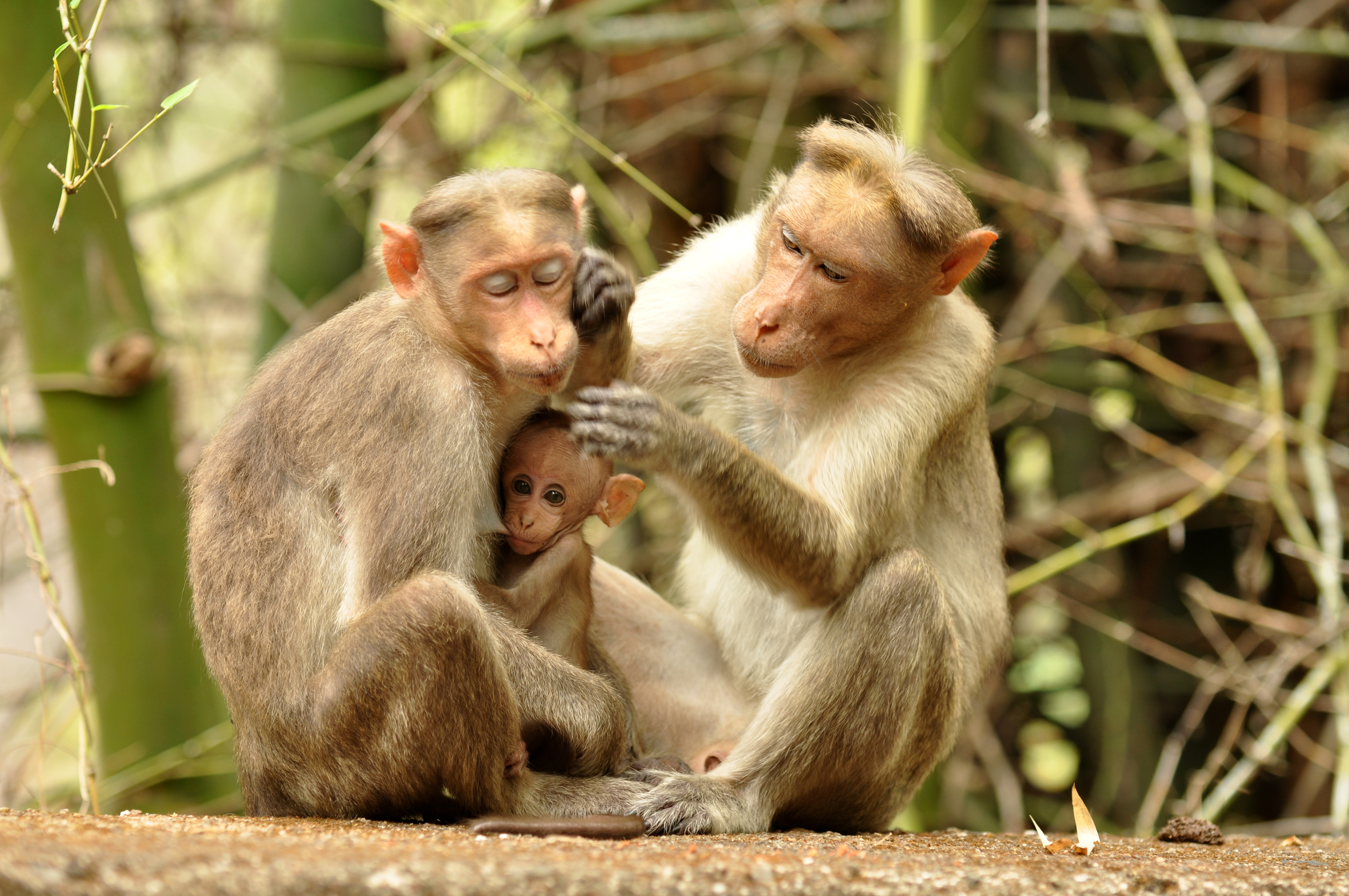
Bonnet macaques with baby in Kerala

The bonnet macaque species live in multi-male, multi-female social groups with a structured dominance hierarchy. Females of the group typically remain in their natal groups throughout their lives whereas males disperse when the reach sexual maturity. Differences in dominance related behaviors are linked to personality variation such as individuals with higher sociability tend to participate more often in play and connectional contact with other individuals.

Furthermore, the bonnet macaque shows sex based personality trends where females display a higher level of connectional and tolerant behavior and males more frequently engage in competitive and dominance related interactions. These more aggressive and dominant males may gain greater access to limited resources such as food and even mating opportunities. Individuals that are low in the social hierarchy have lower levels of aggression and may rely more heavily on establishing social relationships and support from individuals within their group.

The bonnet macaque is a very social animal and it communicates in a different range of facial expressions. The bonnet macaque, like other macaques, shares a linear dominance hierarchy; the alpha male is the most dominant male of the troop, followed by a beta male and a gamma male, and so on according to their dominance. Similarly, females also follow this linear hierarchy. The male and female hierarchies are different and of a non-overlapping or non-mixing types. Males are usually dominant over females. In their social groups females tend to stay in the same group they were born in, whereas males tend to disperse.

The females' dominance hierarchy is stable, whilst the males' dominance hierarchy is very dynamic. In the male hierarchy, males close in rank often fight to rise in rank. A male has the best chance of obtaining a high rank in his prime age, resulting in the greatest benefits to reproduction. High-ranking individuals have first access to breeding females. Females are receptive during only a few months in a year, resulting in competition between males. In this situation, the ranks established by aggressive encounters come into play. Most of these aggressive encounters are easily resolved, but competition between similarly built or similarly aggressive males results in brutal and sometimes fatal fights. Female bonnet macaques attempt kidnappings of lower-ranking females. These are done mostly by mother females and the majority of the time they are not successful in completing it. Different males may employ various means to rise in rank. Coalition formation between unrelated males to oust a more dominant male has been observed. Males often move from troop to troop to gain a higher rank with the resulting benefits. However, males remaining in a single troop have been observed to rise to become dominant male of that troop.

An important note is male bonnet macaques are generally far more laid back and carefree in their social lives than many other macaque species. Competition among male bonnet macaques is much more subdued and there is a much higher emphasis on pacifism. Male bonnet macaques groom each other, hug each other, sleep near each other, play together and engage in male-male mounting as a social defuser. While assertive males may take measures to monopolize matings, they cannot control females and these females will mate promiscuously, as macaques do. Some mysterious environmental pressures must have driven the bonnet macaque to form an unusually egalitarian social structure. Why this trend crops up convergently in separate macaque species rather than being an ancestral macaque trait is an enigma. A possible driving force may be these pacifist species inhabit more fertile habitats with more abundant food. Bonnet macaques are also strong swimmers.

In the case of females, the stable dominance hierarchy is a result of female philopatry, when individuals tend to remain with the troop into which they are born. This results in the formation of matrilinear groupings of closely related females.

=== Habitat use and interaction ===
The bonnet macaque lives in a broad range of environments across southern India especially in human-dominated environments. The regular use of roadsides, villages, and temple environments has altered the species foraging strategies as well as their activity patterns. The species' increased reliance on man made food sources has increased human and Bonnet macaque interactions. Additionally, habitat fragmentation caused by the expansion of roadsides, agriculture, and infrastructure development affects the species movement, group ranging, and access to traditional foraging areas. Although the species is behaviorally adaptive, they face an increased risk when in these human-dominated areas such as disease transmission to humans, injury from vehicles, and even a heightened aggression linked to competition for food.

=== Feeding and diet ===
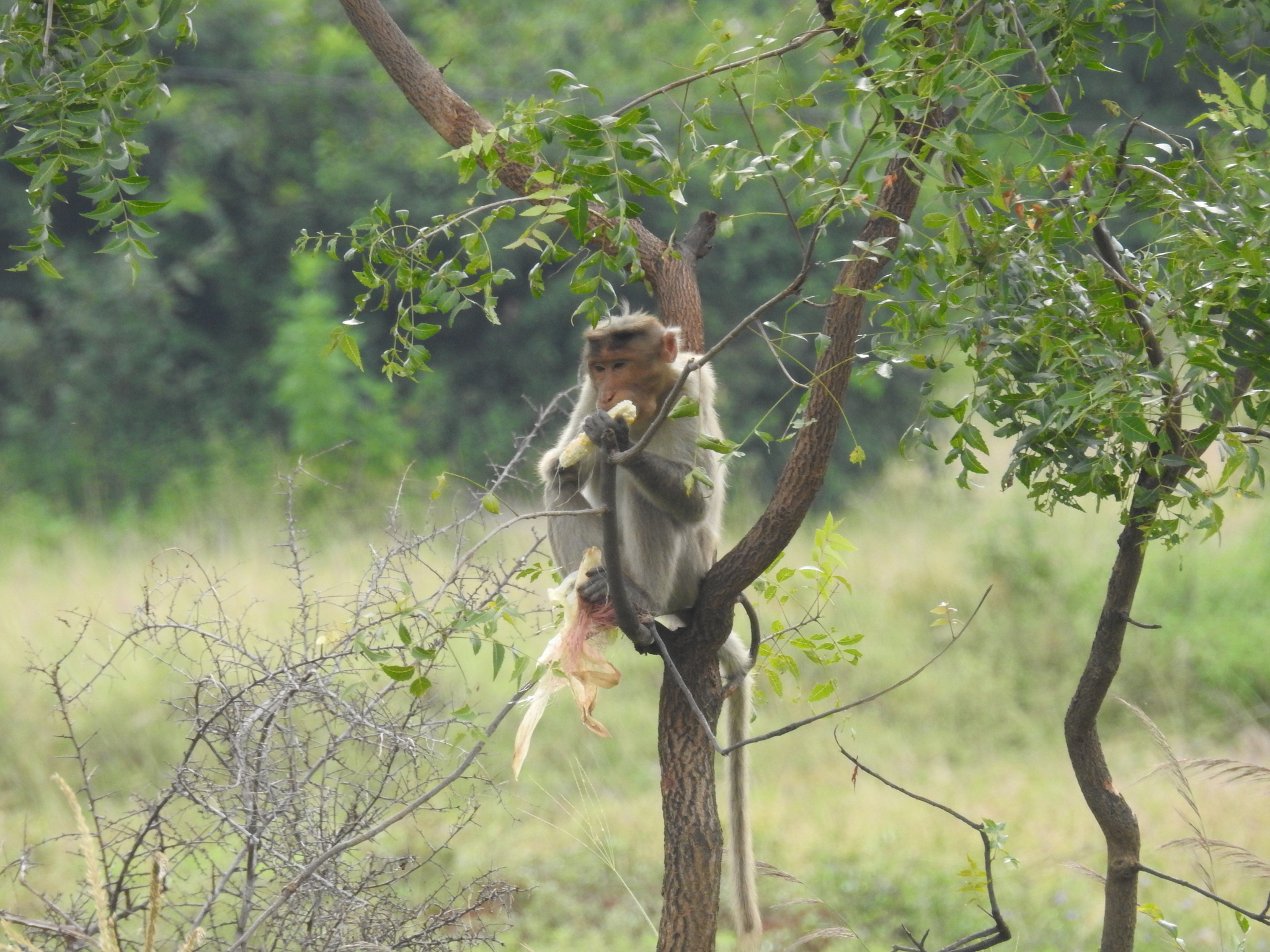
Bonnet macaque eating corn in Karnataka

The bonnet macaque is a highly flexible species that is supported by a broad and adaptable diet, behavioral tolerance towards humans especially in close proximity, and the ability to exploit human food resources. It is omnivorous and eats fruits, seeds, nuts, flowers, along with some invertebrates such as crickets, grasshoppers, termites, insect larva/eggs, and spiders. When eating food from the ground, it rubs the food between its palms before often stuffing its cheek pouches with food.

=== Reproduction ===
The bonnet macaque attains reproductive maturity when they are three to four years old. The majority of births take place from February to April, before the arrival of the monsoon. The bonnet macaque is polygynandrous. The gestation period lasts 24 weeks and a single infant is the normal result of a pregnancy. The young will breast feed for six to seven months and begin assisted feedings of solid food from their mother thereafter. Other members of the troop, especially related females, will express interest in the infant in its first months of life.

Infant survival among the bonnet macaque is closely related to maternal care and social conditions within the group of species. First-time mothers typically have a lower infant survival rate when compared to experienced mothers. This is due to the distribution of energy which influences offspring survival rates. Mothers must learn to balance energy between current offspring and future reproduction, especially since younger mothers are still growing themselves. A higher investment of energy can improve infant survival but consequently reduce future reproduction success. When it comes to the sex of the infant Bonnet macaque, female infants typically receive more consistent maternal care wheres male infants show higher mortality rates because of their need for more resources and maternal care that some mothers are unable to provide.
