= Ramadevarabetta Vulture Sanctuary =

Bird sanctuary in Karnataka

- IUCN category IV (habitat/species management area)
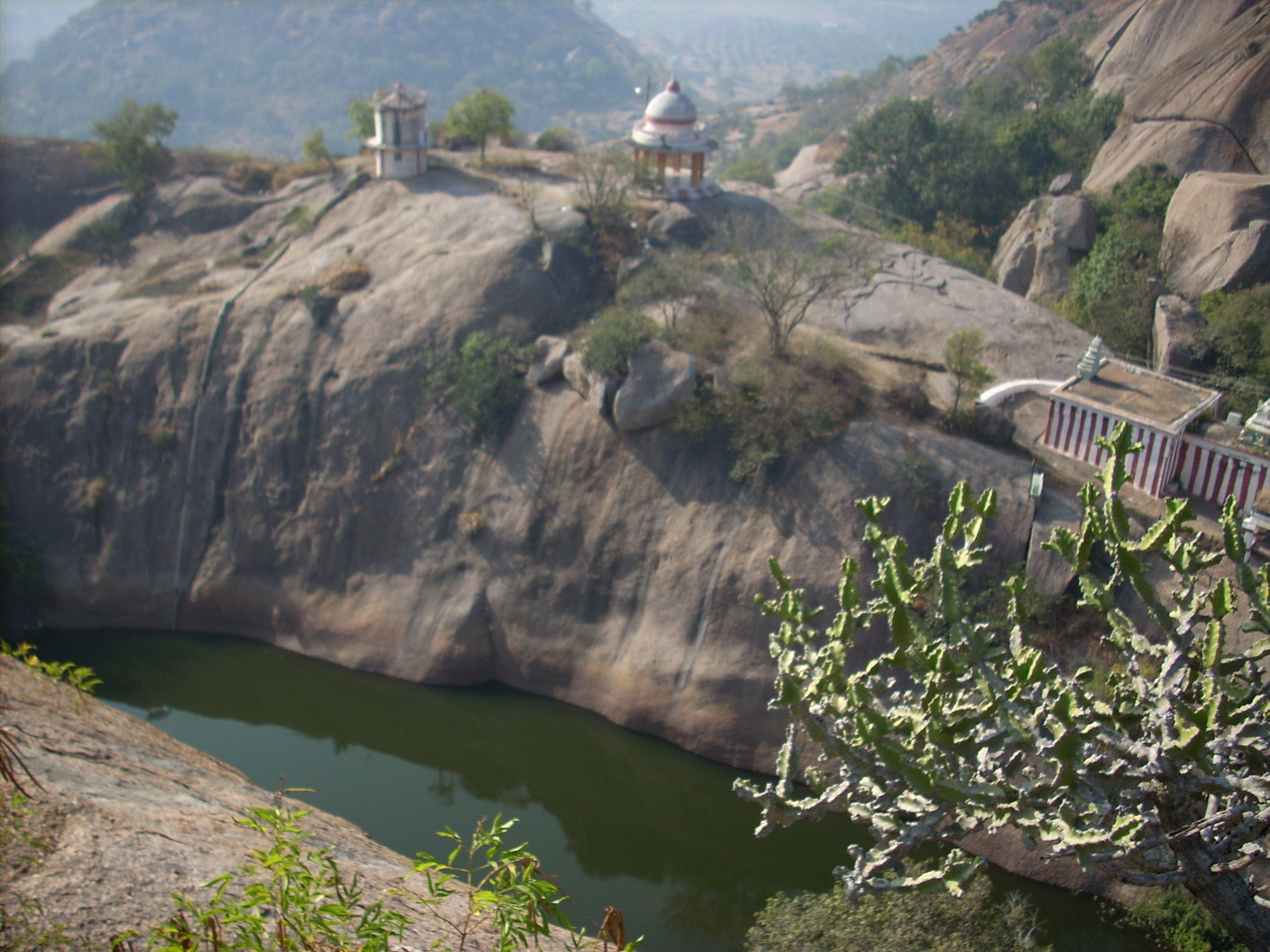
- Birds eye view of Ramdevara Temple, located inside the sanctuary

- Location within Karnataka Location within India
- Interactive map of Ramadevarabetta Vulture Sanctuary
- Location: Ramanagara district, Karnataka, India
- Coordinates: 12°45′12″N 77°18′05″E
- Area: 3.4641 km^{2} (1.3 sq mi)
- Established: 2012
- Governing body: Department of forests, Government of Karnataka

Ramadevarabetta Vulture Sanctuary is a bird sanctuary in Karnataka India, aimed for the protection of vultures. Established in 2012, it is the first Vulture Sanctuary in India. Of the nine vulture species found in India, three species, long-billed, Egyptian and white-backed vultures are found here. In 2018, Indian government tagged an area of 1.30 meters to 1.80 km from the boundary of the sanctuary as an eco-sensitive zone (ESZ). The total area of the eco-sensitive zone is 7.08 km^{2} (2.7 sq mi).

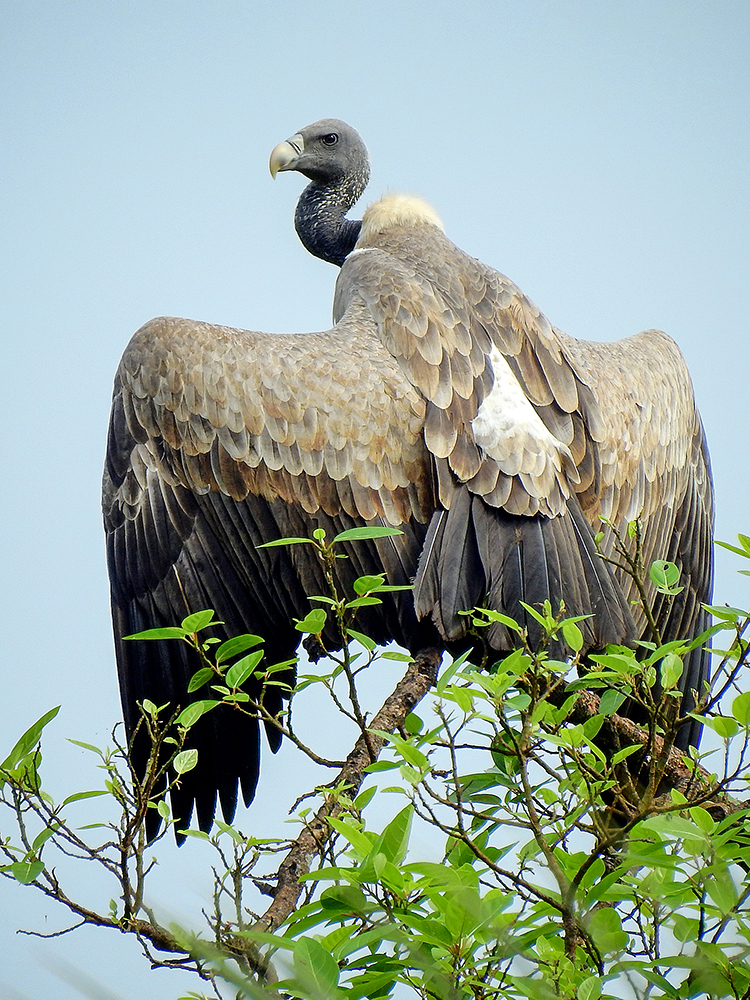
Indian vulture, an endangered vulture species found in the sanctuary

== History ==
Vultures have long been found in the hills of Ramanagara. Environmentalists and bird watchers started campaigning for the area to be declared a sanctuary as the number of vultures has dropped alarmingly. As a result, Ramadevarabetta Vulture Sanctuary was officially established in 2012. It is the first and only Vulture Sanctuary in India.

== Description ==
Ramadevarabetta Vulture Sanctuary is a bird sanctuary located in Ramanagara, Ramanagara district, Karnataka, India. It is located within the area of proposed Sholay theme park. The sanctuary covers an area of 3.4641 km^{2} (1.3 sq mi).

== Flora and fauna ==
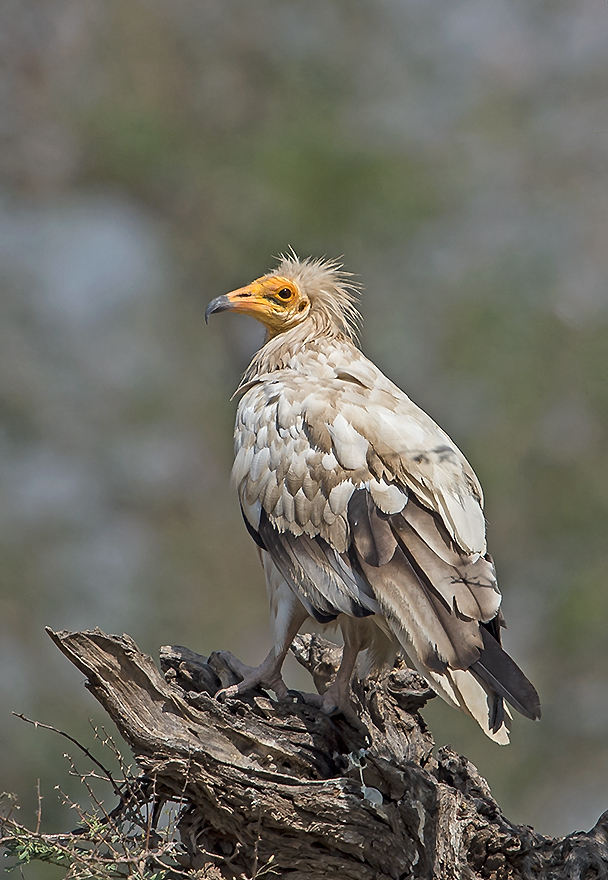
Egyptian Vulture

Of the nine vulture species found in India, three species, long-billed, Egyptian and white-backed vultures are found in Ramanagara. As of 2020, the Ramadevarabetta sanctuary has only five long-billed vultures and 25 Egyptian vultures. The Ramadevarabetta Vulture Sanctuary is rich in biodiversity and is home to many butterfly species, bees, birds, bats, spiders and snakes.

== Threats and precautionary measures ==
The increase in the number of vultures around Ramadevarabetta was due to the increased availability of silk pupae and poultry waste in the surrounding areas. Studies indicate that the number of Indian vulture (Long-billed) has decreased by 97 percent and the number of Egyptian vulture by 99 percent.

The veterinary use of diclofenac has been banned in veterinary medicine as it poses a threat to birds such as vultures that feed on animal carcasses. Given the alarming decline in the number of vultures since the 1990s, the Forest Department and other conservation organizations have made significant efforts to protect the existing population and allow it to thrive. As the number of vultures is declining, the Forest Department has started a Vulture Breeding Center at Ramadevarabetta.

In 2018, to protect from rapid industrialization and mining, Indian government tagged an area of 1.30 meters to 1.80 km from the boundary of the sanctuary as an eco-sensitive zone (ESZ). Consisting area from six villages (Harisandra, Madapura, Kethohalli, Basavanapura, Vaderahalli and Hallimala) and one hamlet, the total area of the eco-sensitive zone is 7.08 km^{2} (2.7 sq mi).

Recent research has also revealed that crowds of people visiting the Ramdevara Temple inside the sanctuary, as well as by climbers and bikers, are causing disturbance to the breeding of raptors.
