= Yettinahole project =

Water supply project in Karnataka, India

Yettinahole project (Yettinahole Integrated Drinking Water Supply Project)
- Yettinahole drinking water project (Pumping station 1) in 2026
- Type of project: Drinking water project
- Country: India
- Launched: 2012; Yettinahole, Kumbardi estate, Karnataka 573134
- Website: vjnl.karnataka.gov.in/12/yettinahole-integrated-drinking-water-supply-project/en
- Status: Unknown

Yettinahole project, sometimes written as Ettinahole project, is a water supplying project in the state of Karnataka, India. Yettinahole project is planned and executed by the Government of Karnataka. This project envisages constructing of dams across Netravati River and its tributaries in midst of evergreen forest of Western Ghats before joining Arabian Sea and pumping about 24 thousand million cubic feet of water to the top of Western ghat and to Deccan Plateau or Bayaluseemae to quench drinking water thirst of Kolar, Chikkaballapura and other districts of the state.

The dams are mostly constructed in ecologically sensitive regions of Hassan district and Dakshina Kannada district which lies in Karavali region of Karnataka. Many environmentalists have criticized Yettinahole project as it will destroy trees, pollute water and obstruct pathways of wild animals of western ghats. The Yettinahole project has been opposed by activists because of disasters it will cause to environment and nature and submitted memorandum to then Union (Central) government ran by BJP to stop. The Union (Central) government gave nod, despite protests. Karnataka government led by Yedayurappa continued the work on this project

Yettinahole drinking water project (Pumping station 1, Kumbardi estate) in 2026

Yettinahole project has been flagged by CAG for delay, financial uncertainty and tender deviations First approved in the year 2012 at the cost of 8,323 crores of Rupees when BJP was in power in Karnataka state, The Yettinahole project is uncompleted as on 31 May 2026 nearly after fourteen years of approval. In January 2023, when BJP was ruling Karnataka state, its cost was revised to 23,252.66 crores of rupees. The Ministry of Environment, Forests and Climate Change (MoEF&CC) has asked to pay penalty which is five times Net Present Value (NPV) of forestland plus 12% simple interest for unauthorised work taken up on 266.79 acres of forest. The Central government has deferred nod to Yettinahole water supply project with reports of large scale destruction of forests and fear of landslides in Western ghats of Karnataka.
