= Deccan thorn scrub forests =

Ecoregion of India and Sri Lanka

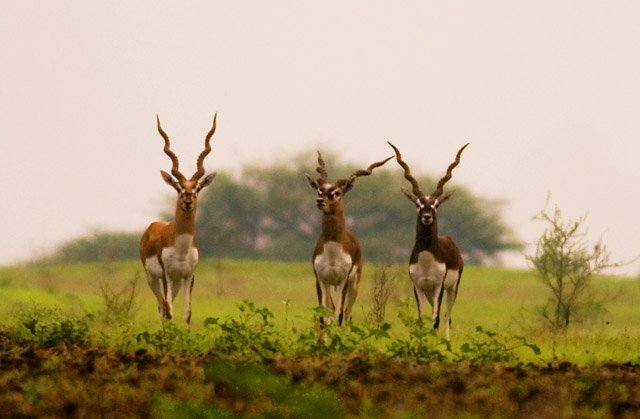
- Blackbucks at Ranibennur Blackbuck Sanctuary

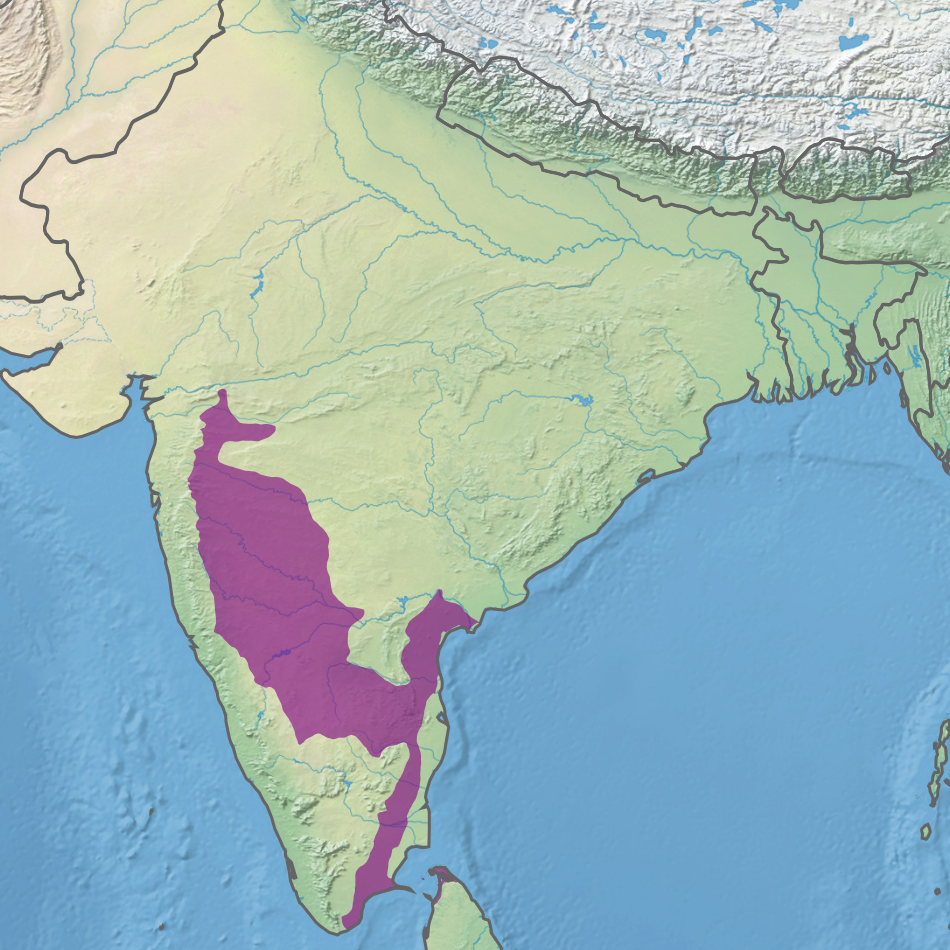
- Ecoregion territory (in purple)

Ecology
- Realm: Indomalayan
- Biome: Deserts and xeric shrublands
- Borders: List: Central Deccan Plateau dry deciduous forests; East Deccan dry evergreen forests; Godavari-Krishna mangroves; Narmada Valley dry deciduous forests; North Western Ghats moist deciduous forests; South Deccan Plateau dry deciduous forests; Sri Lanka dry-zone dry evergreen forests

Geography
- Area: 338,197 km^{2} (130,579 mi^{2})
- Countries: India; Sri Lanka
- States of India: Andhra Pradesh; Karnataka; Maharashtra; Tamil Nadu; Telangana

Conservation
- Conservation status: critical/endangered
- Protected: 9,430 km^{2} (3%)

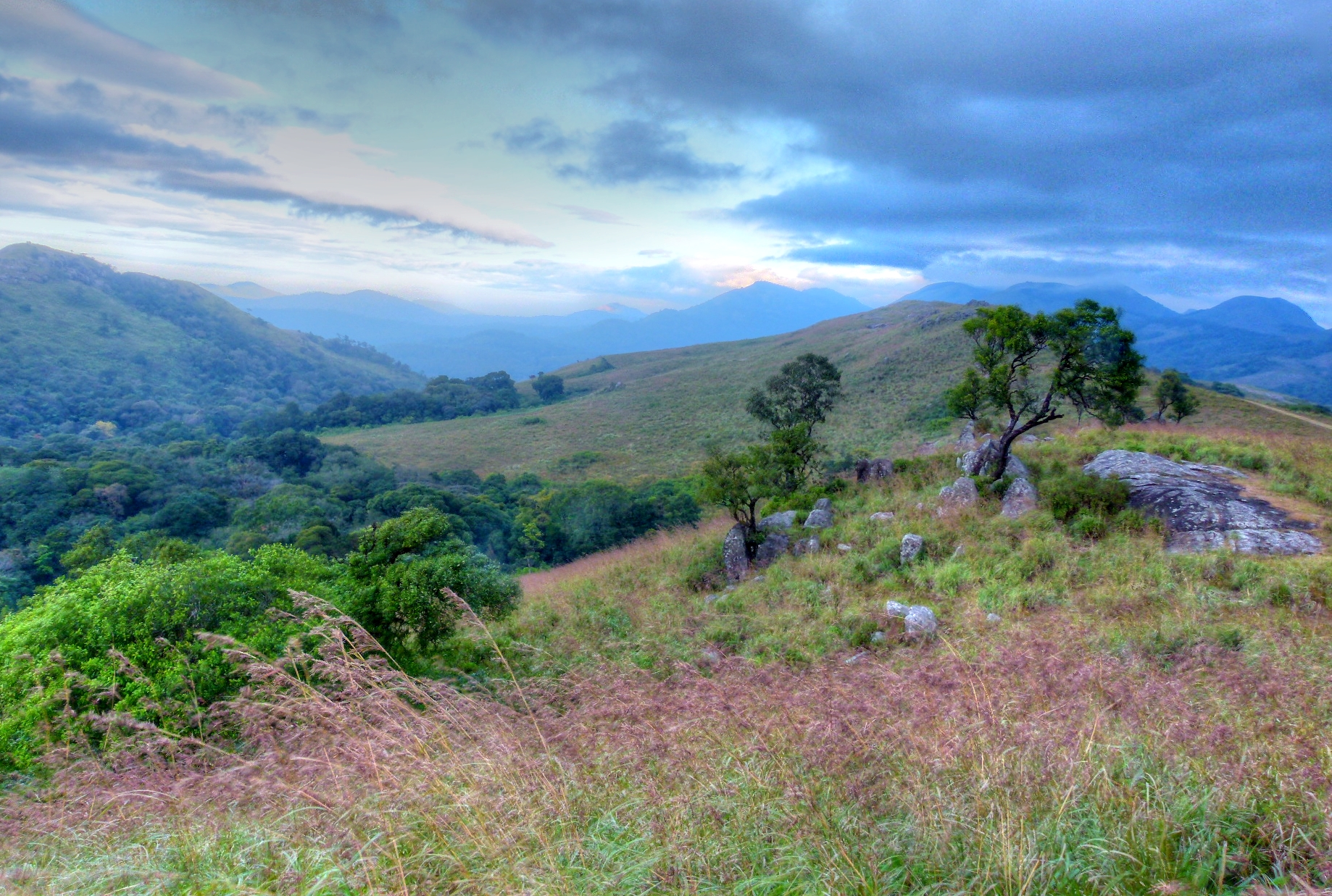
Jodigere Dry Forests, Karnataka

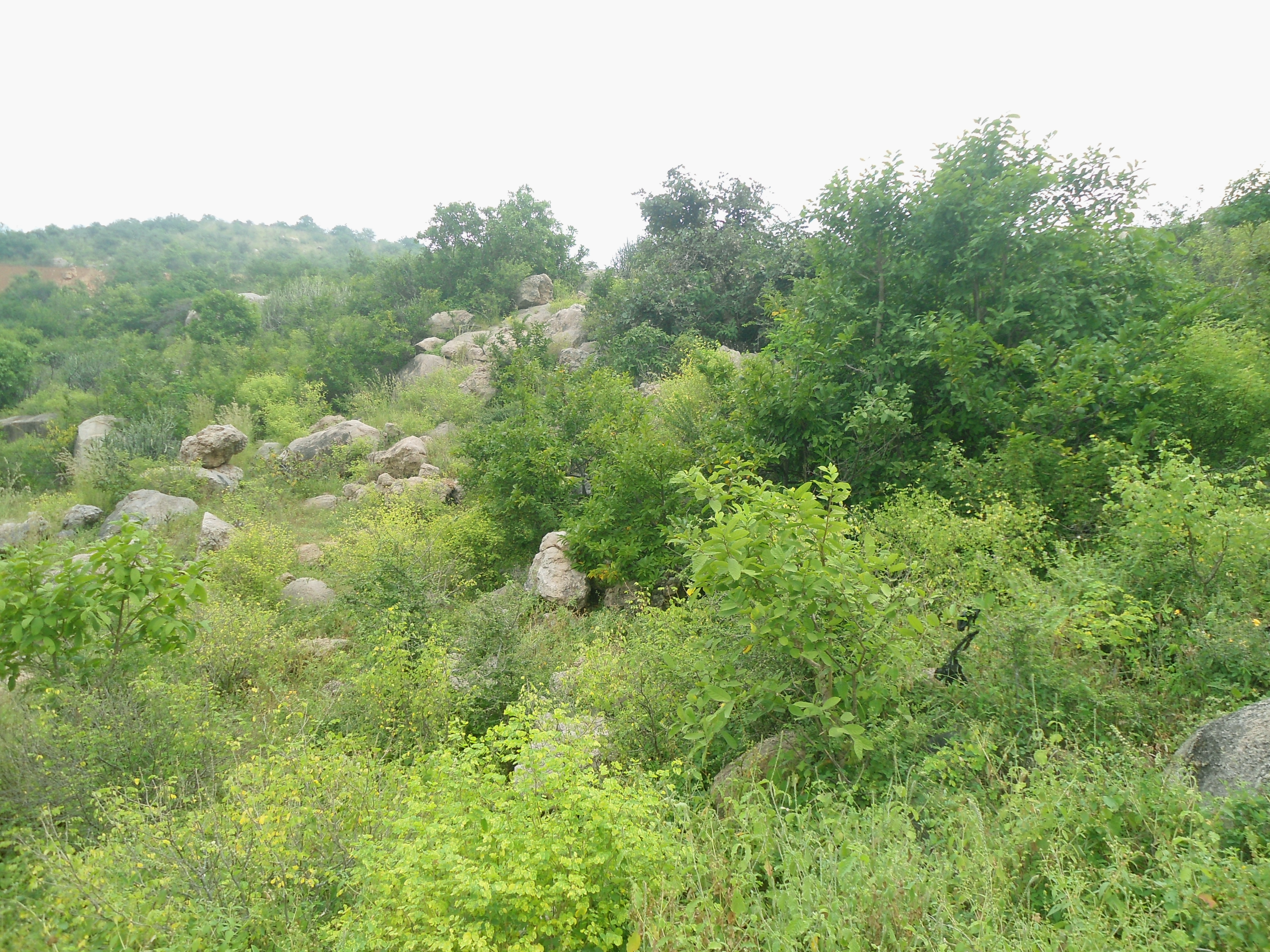
Scrub forests at Mastyagiri, Telangana

The Deccan thorn scrub forests are a xeric shrubland ecoregion of south India and northern Sri Lanka. Historically this area is thought to be covered by tropical dry deciduous forest, where drier closed canopy woodlands blanketed the land before being cleared. However open canopy savannah, which forms a part of this ecoregion is considered ancient natural ecosystems in the more arid rain shadow region and can be considered as a tropical grassland biome. The vegetation consists mainly of southern tropical thorn scrub type forests. These consist of open woodland with thorny trees with short trunks and low, branching crowns; spiny and xerophytic shrubs; and dry grassland. This is the habitat of the great Indian bustard and blackbuck, though these and other animals are declining in numbers; this area was at one time home to large numbers of elephants and tigers. Almost 350 species of bird have been recorded here. The remaining natural habitat is threatened by overgrazing and invasive weeds, but there are a number of small protected areas which provide a haven for the wildlife. Trees in these forests have adapted to not require much water.

== Geography ==
This ecoregion covers the semi-arid portions of the Deccan Plateau, extending across the Indian states of Maharashtra, Telangana, Karnataka, Andhra Pradesh, and Tamil Nadu to the Northern Province of Sri Lanka. Only small patches of natural habitat remain, as most of the region has been cleared for grazing.

== Climate ==
The annual rainfall is less than 750 mm (30 in), all falling during the short rainy season, and the area receives no rainfall during the months of November to April. Temperatures can exceed 40 °C (104 °F) during the hotter months.

== Flora ==
Today the remaining forest is mostly southern tropical thorn scrub, and also includes patches of the original vegetation, tropical dry deciduous forests.

Southern tropical thorn scrub forests consist of open, low vegetation with thorny trees with short trunks and low, branching crowns that rarely meet to form a closed canopy. The trees grow up to 6–9 m (20–30 ft). Typical grasses of the ecoregion include Chrysopogon fulvus, Heteropogon contortus, Eremopogon foveolatus, Aristida setacea, and Dactyloctenium species.

The second storey of the thorn scrub forests in Maharashtra is poorly developed and mainly consists spiny and xerophytic species, mostly shrubs. An ill-defined lower storey can also be seen during the brief wet season. The plant species that dominate the vegetation in these forests are Acacia species, Balanites roxburghii, Cordia myxa, Capparis spp., Prosopis spp., Azadirachta indica, Cassia fistula, Diospyros chloroxylon, Carissa carandas, and Phoenix sylvestris. There are also several other habitat types found in these forests.

The driest, rockiest areas of the ecoregion are covered with a scrub dominated by species of Euphorbia. The soil is usually bare in these areas; however, some grassy growth may also appear during the short monsoon season.

The parts of the ecoregion found in Tamil Nadu receive even less rainfall than most, and the vegetation in these parts is mainly made up of thinly spread thorny forests of Vachellia planifrons, with umbrella-shaped crowns.

The remaining patches of forest are also home to a large number of plants, some of medicinal and botanical interest, including an endemic cycad (Cycas beddomei) and Psilotum nudum. A small patch of the tree Shorea talura also exists within the Chittoor forest division, part of which is being maintained as a preservation plot by the Forest Department of Andhra Pradesh.

Finally, the area between the Nallamala and Seshachalam Hills is well known for the red sanders (Pterocarpus santalinus), a rare, endemic tree species that is harvested for the medicinal value of its wood.

== Fauna ==
The dry grasslands that predominate do provide habitat for the native fauna remaining scattered amid the thorn forest. The grasslands of southern Andhra Pradesh support a good population of the great Indian bustard (Ardeotis nigriceps) and blackbuck (Antilope cervicapra), although these and other species are declining in number.

The forests used to provide habitat for three prominent mammal species, the Bengal tiger (Panthera tigris tigris), the Indian elephant (Elephas maximus indicus), whose populations have recently dwindled and may have even become locally extinct, and the nilgai antelope (Boselaphus tragocamelus).

The ecoregion is home to 96 mammal species, out of which three are considered endemic: split roundleaf bat (Hipposideros schistaceus), Kondana soft-furred rat (Millardia kondana), and Elvira rat (Cremnomys elvira). Other threatened mammal species found in these forests include the tiger, gaur (Bos gaurus), dhole (Cuon alpinus), sloth bear (Melursus ursinus), chousingha (Tetracerus quadricornis), and blackbuck (Antilope cervicapra). Little-known ones like the Slender loris also occur here.

The Deccan thorn scrub forests are home to a richer variety of birds: almost 350 species, of which three are considered near-endemic: Jerdon's courser (Rhinoptilus bitorquatus), Sri Lanka junglefowl (Gallus lafayetii), and yellow-fronted barbet (Megalaima flavifrons). Jerdon's courser is a critically endangered species which was rediscovered in this ecoregion in 1986 after being recorded for the last time in 1900. Other endangered bird species such as the lesser florican (Sypheotides indicus) and Indian bustard can also be found in the ecoregion.

Over 60 species of herpetofauna are known to occur in such forest types. Unique species of amphibians and reptiles do occur here. Such species include the Duttaphrynus hololius, lizards viz. Hemidactylus scabriceps, Hemidactylus reticulatus, Ophisops leschenaultii, Eutropis beddomii and snakes viz. Coluber bholanathi, Chrysopelea taprobanica. Apart from such forms, most of the widespread species of herpetofauna, occurring on a pan-Indian scale, including the endangered Indian star tortoise, Indian chameleon, and Bengal monitor also occur here.

== Threats and conservation ==
The remaining deciduous woodland continues to be cleared for grazing while the pasture that has been created is itself threatened by overgrazing and invasive weeds. One large area of natural forest remains in southern Andhra Pradesh.

== Protected areas ==
9,430 km^{2}, or 3%, of the ecoregion is within protected areas. In 1997, there were eleven protected areas that were entirely or partially within the ecoregion, totaling 4,110 km^{2}. Current protected areas include:

- Chundikkulam National Park, Sri Lanka (196 km^{2})
- Daroji Sloth Bear Sanctuary, Karnataka (82.72 km^{2})
- Ghataprabha Bird Sanctuary, Karnataka (29.8 km^{2})
- Great Indian Bustard Sanctuary, Maharashtra (8,496 km^{2}, extension 400 km^{2})
- Jayakwadi Bird Sanctuary, Maharashtra 230 km^{2}
- Koundinya Wildlife Sanctuary, Andhra Pradesh (357.6 km^{2})
- Nandur Madhmeshwar Bird Sanctuary, Maharashtra (100.1 km^{2})
- Pakkamalai Reserve Forest, Tamil Nadu
- Ranibennur Blackbuck Sanctuary, Karnataka (119 km^{2})
- Sagareshwar Wildlife Sanctuary, Maharashtra (10.9 km^{2})
- Sri Venkateswara National Park, Andhra Pradesh 500 km^{2}
- Tungabhadra Otter Conservation Reserve, Karnataka
- Tungabhadra Wildlife Sanctuary, Karnataka 90 km^{2}
- Vettangudi Bird Sanctuary, Tamil Nadu (0.38 km^{2}; also in East Deccan dry evergreen forests)
