= Ranibennur Blackbuck Sanctuary =

Ranebennur Blackbuck Sanctuary
- IUCN category IV (habitat/species management area)
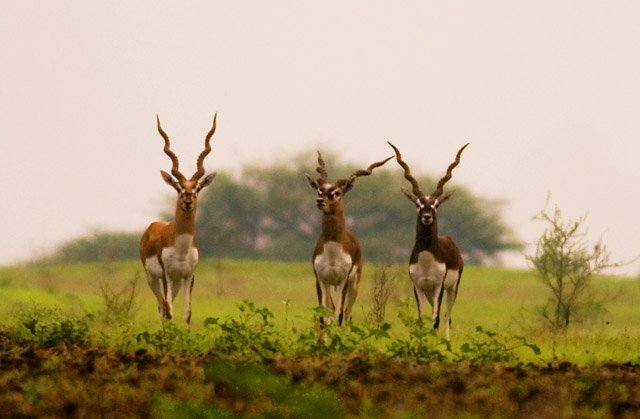

- Location within Karnataka Location within India
- Interactive map of Ranebennur Blackbuck Sanctuary
- Location: Ranebennur, Karnataka, India
- Coordinates: 14°38′N 75°42′E
- Area: 119 km^{2} (46 sq mi)
- Established: 1974

Ranebennur Blackbuck Sanctuary (119 km^{2}) was declared as a sanctuary mainly to protect blackbucks. It comprises two unconnected portions, an eastern and a western bit. The sanctuary has a core zone of 14.87 km^{2} and a buffer-cum tourism zone of 104.13 km^{2}. The area is covered mainly by scrub forest and Eucalyptus plantations. Agricultural fields surround the sanctuary.

The sanctuary is also inhabited by the highly endangered great Indian bustard and the wolf. However, the great Indian bustard has not been sighted in the sanctuary since around 2002 and may be locally extinct. Blackbuck are plentiful with a count of more than 6000 in the 2005 census. The blackbuck can be sighted between October and March, while the bustard is sighted from February to June.

== History ==
Ranebennur Blackbuck Sanctuary was declared a wildlife sanctuary on 17 June 1974 to protect Blackbucks.

== Geography ==
This Sanctuary is situated approximately 118 km from Hubli and 302 km from Bangalore in Haveri district. It is 8 km from Ranebennur town. It is divided into three blocks viz; Hulathi, Hunasikatti and Alageri for administrative purposes. It has a core area of 14.87 km^{2} and a buffer zone of 104.13 km^{2} wherein tourists are allowed. There is a forest rest house on the sanctuary boundary at Gangajala.

== Flora ==
The original vegetation until 1956 consisted mainly of Acacia, catechu, Prosopis juliflora, Dodonaea viscosa and Cassia auriculata. In an attempt to increase vegetation cover in the area, it was planted with eucalyptus and some indigenous species. Today, the top canopy is made up almost only of eucalyptus, along with some Hardwickia, binata and Albizia amara. The middle and lower storeys consist of Acacia, catechu, Prosopis juliflora, Dodonaea viscosa, Acaxia sundra, Zizyphus mauritiana, Lantana camara, Randia sp. sacred Tree and Cassia auriculata. The western portion has more open scrubland. Subabul (leucaena leucocephala) has been planted in patches in some parts of the sanctuary. Cassia fistula, neem (Azadirachta indica), Holoptelia integrifolia, Madhuca indica, Ficus sp. and bamboo have been planted along the sanctuary's roads.

== Fauna ==
The sanctuary is known for its blackbuck and wolf populations. Other mammals include wild boar, fox, jackal, langur, porcupine, common mongoose, Bengal monitor hare and pangolin. The population of blackbuck has seen a constant increase since the establishment of the sanctuary. The great Indian bustard, a large cursorial bird, which was quite common in the short grass plains and semi-arid areas of the Indian subcontinent 100 years ago, was indiscriminately hunted, and its habitat destroyed, resulting in a drastic decline in its population, until it came under stringent protection in the 1970s. The highest estimate of bustard in the Ranebennur sanctuary is 14 birds. Apart from the great Indian bustard, avifauna in the sanctuary include peafowl, Asian paradise flycatcher, little grebe, little cormorant, Indian spot-billed duck, fantails, Tickell's blue flycatcher, sparrow hawk, Red-wattled lapwing, sirkeer cuckoo, large grey babbler, Bay backed shrike and black drongo.
