= Karera Wildlife Sanctuary =

- IUCN category IV (habitat/species management area)
- Location within Madhya Pradesh Location within India
- Interactive map of Karera Wildlife Sanctuary
- Location: Shivpuri, Madhya Pradesh, India
- Coordinates: 25.457°N 78.128°E
- Area: 202 square kilometres (78 sq mi)
- Created: 1981

Karera Wildlife Sanctuary is a wildlife Sanctuary in the Shivpuri district of Madhya Pradesh, India. Established in 1981 to protect a population of the Great Indian bustard in the region, it is now in the process of being denotified due to opposition by the local people and the extinction of the bird locally. The tour guide Frommer's included it as 231st in a list of 500 places to see before they disappear.

== History ==
The Karera Sanctuary was notified in 1981 by the Government of Madhya Pradesh in accordance with the provisions of the Wild Life (Protection) Act, 1972. It is spread over an area of 202 km^{2}, of which as much as 146 km^{2} is privately owned land. It was originally created with the aim of protecting the local population of the great Indian bustard. Owing to public pressure and the extinction of the bird locally, the National Board for Wildlife and the Government of Madhya Pradesh have decided to denotify the sanctuary. The decision is now awaiting a final approval from the Supreme Court of India and should it come through, the sanctuary will become the country's first such reserve to lose its official recognition.

== Flora ==
The sanctuary contains mixed deciduous forests and acacia is the principal species. It also has riverine and swamp vegetation within its borders.

== Fauna ==
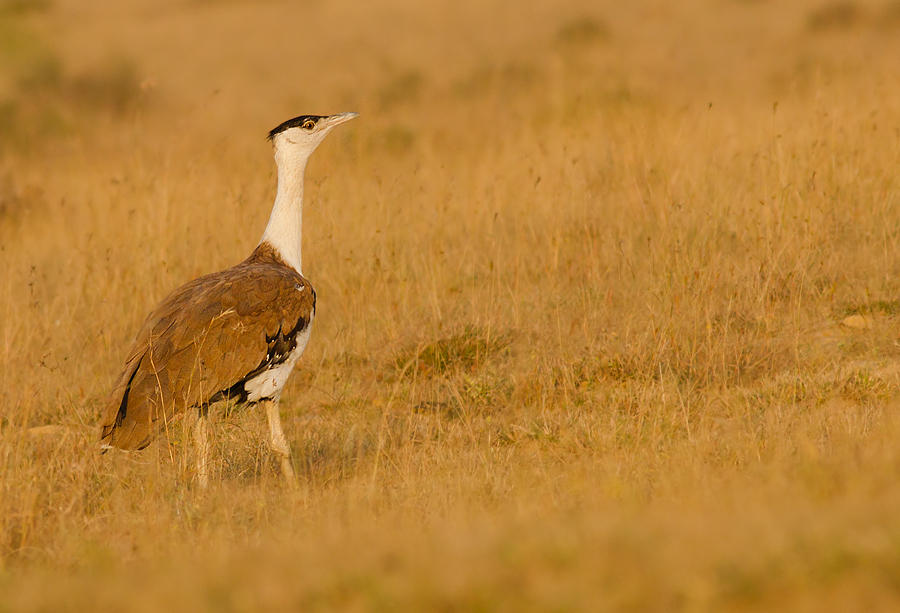
Great Indian Bustard

The bustard, locally known as son chidiya or the golden bird and the blackbuck are the two important faunal species at the park, although bustards have not been spotted here since 1994. The Dihaliya lake within the park hosts migratory birds and the initial approval for denotification of the sanctuary required the establishment of a sanctuary consisting of the lake and the government land around it. 245 migrant species of avifauna including pintails, terns, spoonbills and teals have been recorded at Karera.
