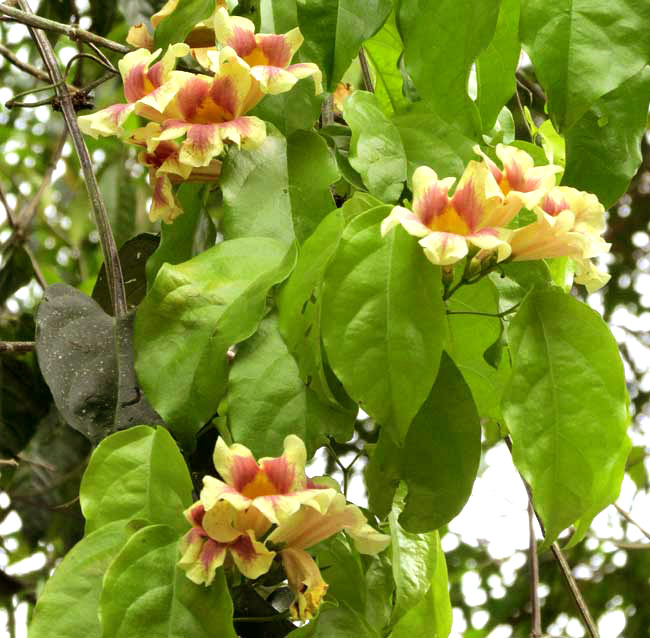

Scientific classification
- Kingdom: Plantae
- Clade: Embryophytes
- Clade: Tracheophytes
- Clade: Angiosperms
- Clade: Eudicots
- Clade: Asterids
- Order: Lamiales
- Family: Bignoniaceae
- Genus: Bignonia
- Species: B. potosina

Binomial name
- Bignonia potosina (K.Schum. & Loes.) L.G.Lohmann

Synonyms
- Arrabidaea potosina K.Schum. & Loes.; Cydista potosina (K.Schum. & Loes.) Loes.; Clytostoma mayanum Standl.

= Bignonia potosina =

Species of plant

Bignonia potosina is a species of liana growing mainly in tropical wet and seasonally dry forests in Mexico and Central America. It belongs to the family Bignoniaceae.

== Description ==
Bignonia potosina is a woody climber. Here are other notable features:

- The high-climbing, hairless stem's four sharp corners often are emphasized by light-colored ridges. At petiole bases arise green, leafy, earlike "pseudostipules" up to about 8 mm (3/8 in) long.
- Leaves arise opposite one another along stems on petioles up to 4 cm (1 1/2 in) long, with blades once-divided into 2 leaflets growing opposite one another, with a tendril arising between them. Leaflets are up to 10 cm (4 in) long and half that wide, with tips gradually narrowing to a point. Most leaflets have 4 or 5 pairs of side veins coming off the midrib.
- Inflorescences composed of several to many flowers appear along stems and at their tips.
- Flowers have corollas which are conspicuously bilaterally symmetrical, with white to creamy corollas with purplish nectar guides leading into the throat. The corolla tube is narrowly funnel shaped, extending about 35 mm (1 1/2 in) beyond the calyx, with lobes around 16 mm (3/4 in) long and 20 mm (3/4 in) wide; there are 2 upper lobes and 3 lower ones. Five stamens of unequal lengths are held inside the corolla tube.
- Fruits are compressed, woody, fairly slender capsules up to about 24 cm (9 1/2 in) long and 3.2 cm (1 1/4 in) wide. They produce many flattened seeds bearing thin, film-like "wings" on opposite sides, and are about 1.5 cm (1/2 in) long and 6 cm (2 1/4 in) wide.

== Distribution ==
In southern Mexico, Bignonia potosina occurs in the southernmost part of the state of Tamaulipas, the states of San Luis Potosí, Puebla and Oaxaca, and the Yucatan Peninsula, southward through Central America into northern Costa Rica.

== Habitat ==
Bignonia potosina occurs in wet and seasonally dry tropical forests.

== Human uses ==
=== In traditional medicine ===
In Mexico's Yucatan Peninsula, Bignonia potosina is used medicinally by the Mayan people for coughs, colds, wound healing, wasps and scorpion stings, as well as bile and kidney diseases. Studies indicated that extracts of Bignonia potosina demonstrated potent and broad-spectrum antibacterial properties against important antimicrobial-resistant forms of bacteria. For wounds, insect and spider bites the leaves are used. An infusion of the leaves is drunk for digestive problems resulting in blood and/or mucous in the feces, and constipation. Also in Mexico, Bignonia potosina is used to promote abortion.

=== In beekeeping ===
In Mexico's Yucatan Peninsula where beekeeping is important in traditional Mayan culture, Bignonia potosina (as Cydista potosina) is listed as a principle producer of nectar and pollen for the Mayan Stingless Bee, Melipona beecheii.

=== In traditional house construction ===
In Mexico, Bignonia potosina is used to tie together poles when building traditional Mayan homes.

== Taxonomy ==
In 1895 when Karl Moritz Schumann and Ludwig Eduard Theodor Loesener formally described Bignonia potosina under than name of Arrabidaea potosina, they remarked that they weren't sure the species should be assigned to the genus Arrabidaea, because they lacked a fruit and the flower's disc was unclear. The type specimen was collected near Tepemichl in the district of Tamazunchale, in the Mexican state of San Luis Potosí by Seler, his #616. The collector Seler was Eduard Seler, a prominent German anthropologist who worked in pre-Columbian era cultures of America. He and his wife collected and distributed about 6,000 numbered plant specimens, and dealt with Loesener.

=== Etymology ===
The genus name Bignonia honors Jean-Paul Bignon (1662–1743), librarian to the French Louis XIV.

The species name potosina derives from the Mexican state of San Luis Potosí, where the taxon was first scientifically collected.

== Gallery ==
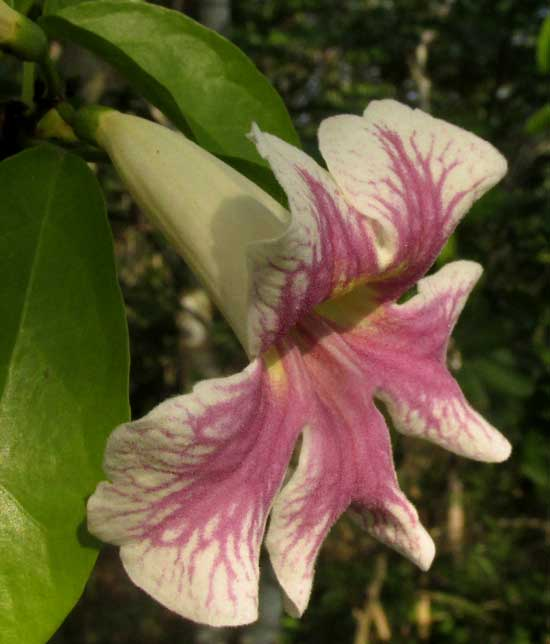
Flower

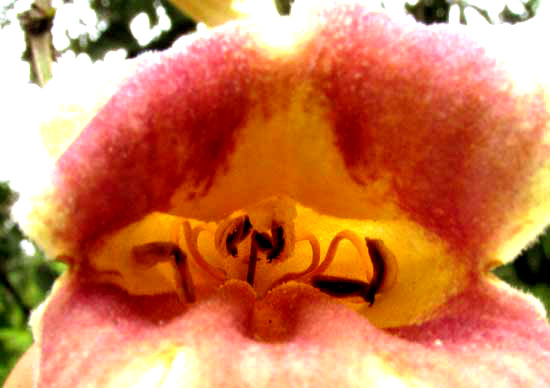
Flower from front showing stamens

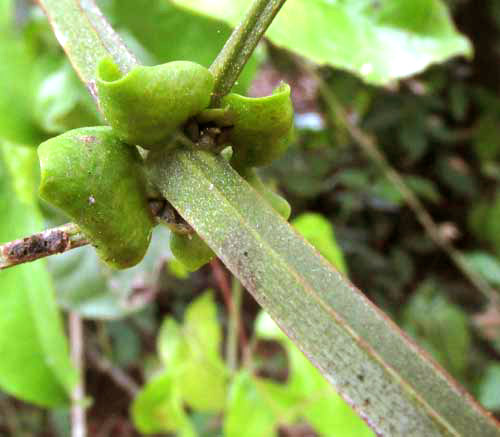
Squared stem and pseudostipules

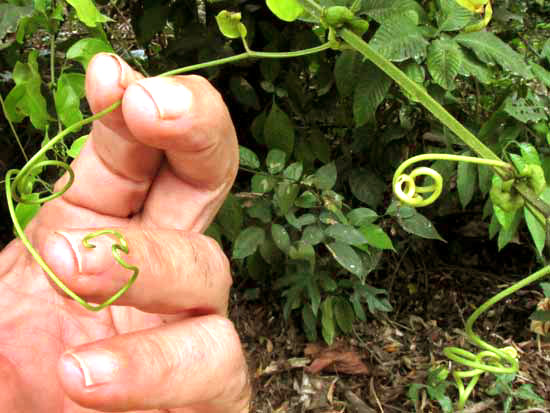
Tendrils
