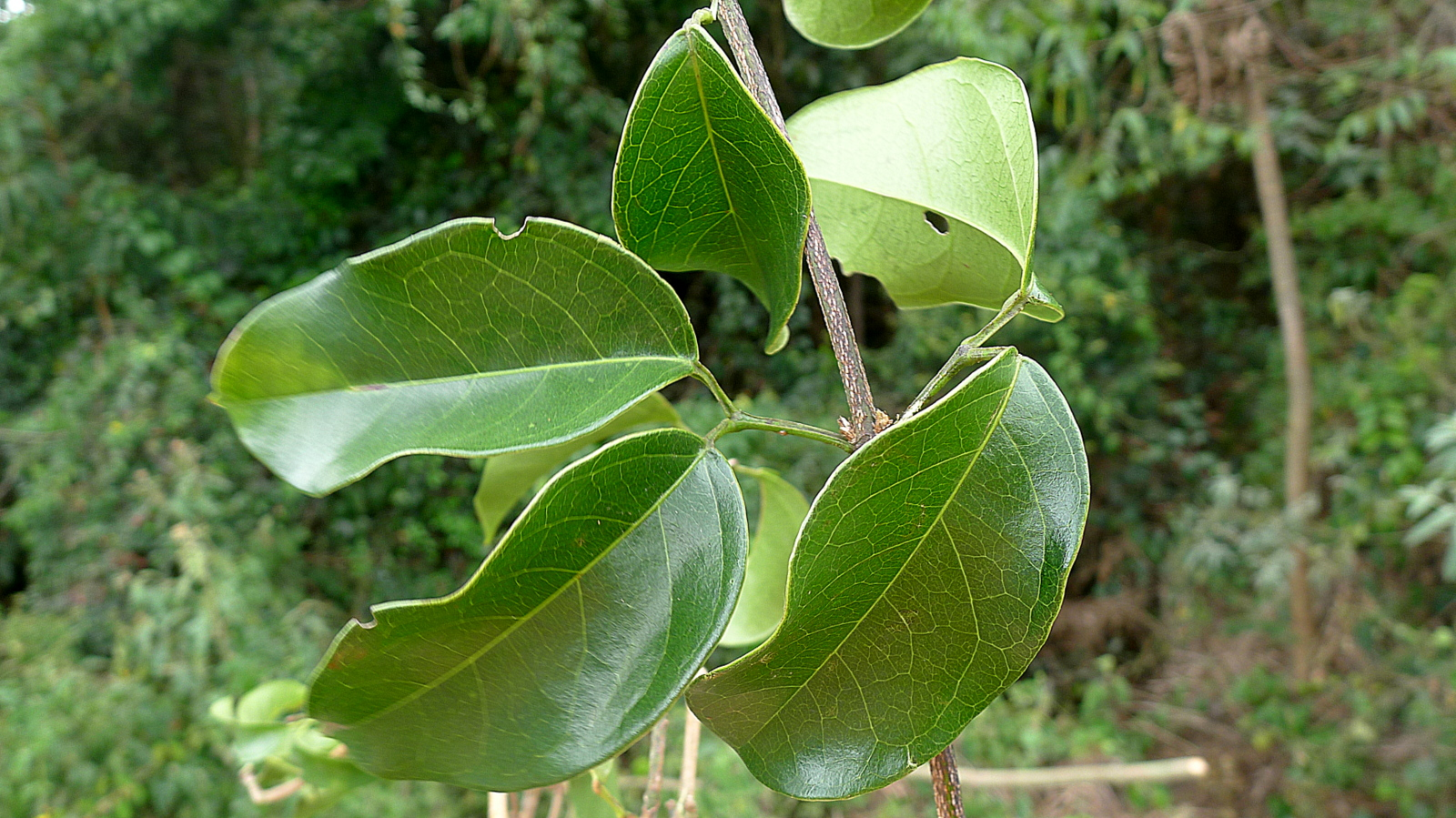

Scientific classification
- Kingdom: Plantae
- Clade: Tracheophytes
- Clade: Angiosperms
- Clade: Eudicots
- Clade: Asterids
- Order: Lamiales
- Family: Bignoniaceae
- Genus: Bignonia
- Species: B. sciuripabula

Binomial name
- Bignonia sciuripabula (Bureau & K.Schum.) L.G.Lohmann

Synonyms
- Arrabidaea sciuripabula K.Schum.; Clytostoma itatiaiense J.C.Gomes; Clytostoma sciuripabulum (K.Schum.) Bureau & K.Schum.; Pithecoctenium sciuripabulum (K.Schum.) Corr.Méllo

= Bignonia sciuripabula =

Species of flowering plant

Bignonia sciuripabula is a flowering plant species in the family Bignoniaceae.

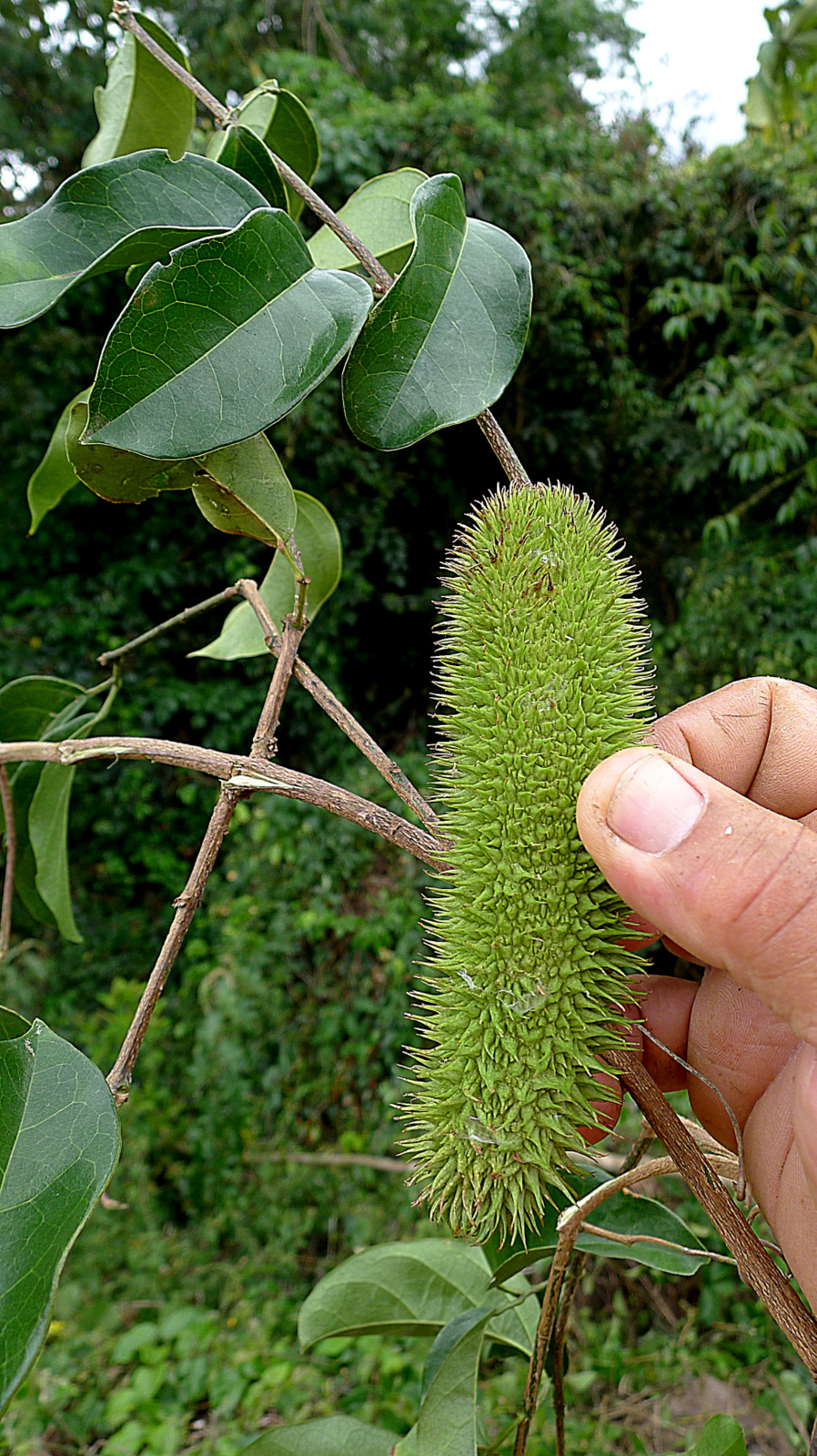
Fruit of Bignonia sciuripabula
