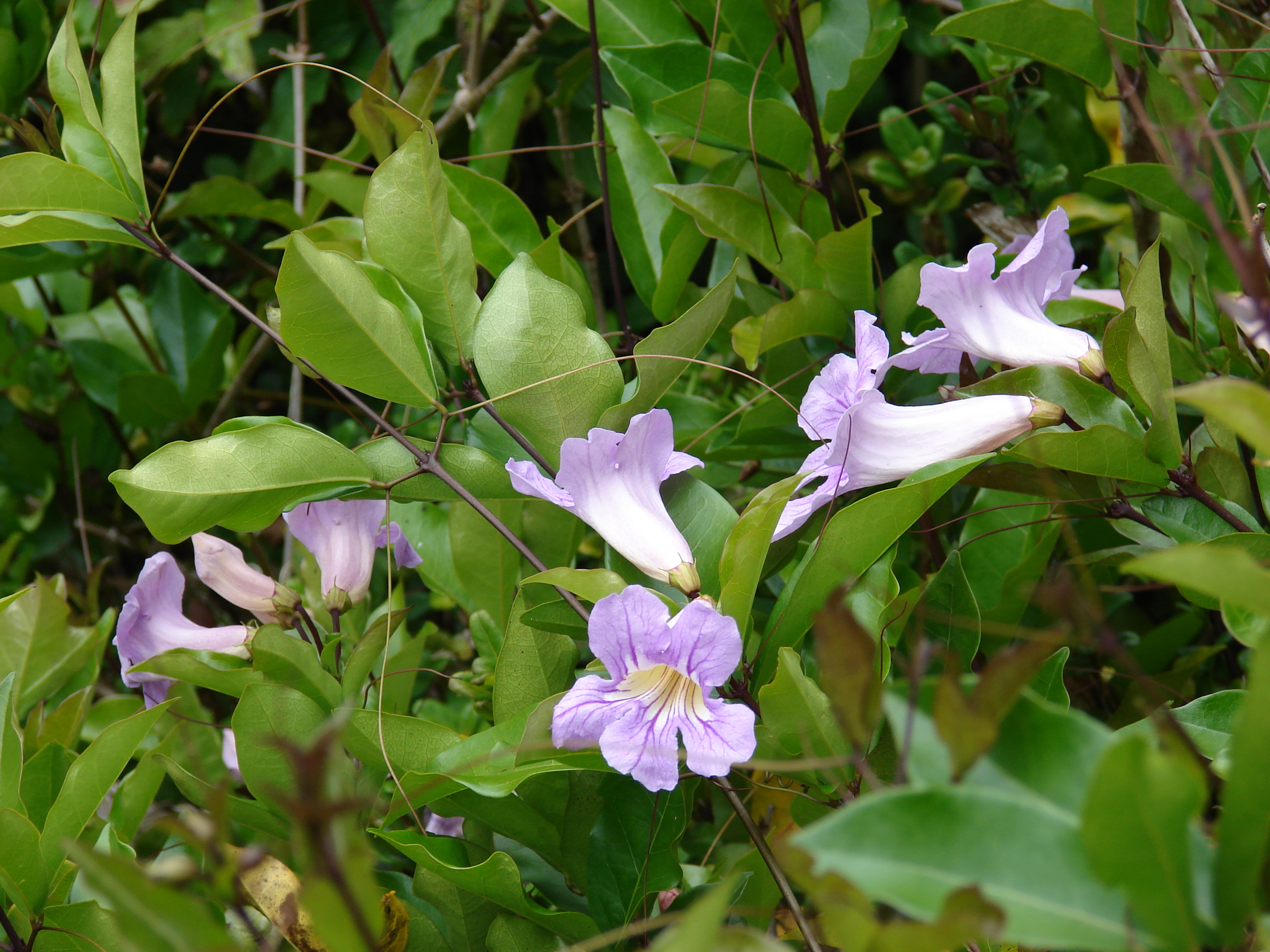

Scientific classification
- Kingdom: Plantae
- Clade: Tracheophytes
- Clade: Angiosperms
- Clade: Eudicots
- Clade: Asterids
- Order: Lamiales
- Family: Bignoniaceae
- Genus: Bignonia
- Species: B. callistegioides

Binomial name
- Bignonia callistegioides Cham., 1832

Synonyms
- Clytostoma callistegioides (Cham.) Bureau ex Griseb.

= Bignonia callistegioides =

Species of flowering plant

Bignonia callistegioides, also known as violet trumpet vine and lavender trumpet vine, is a vine native to southern Brazil and Argentina.

== Description ==
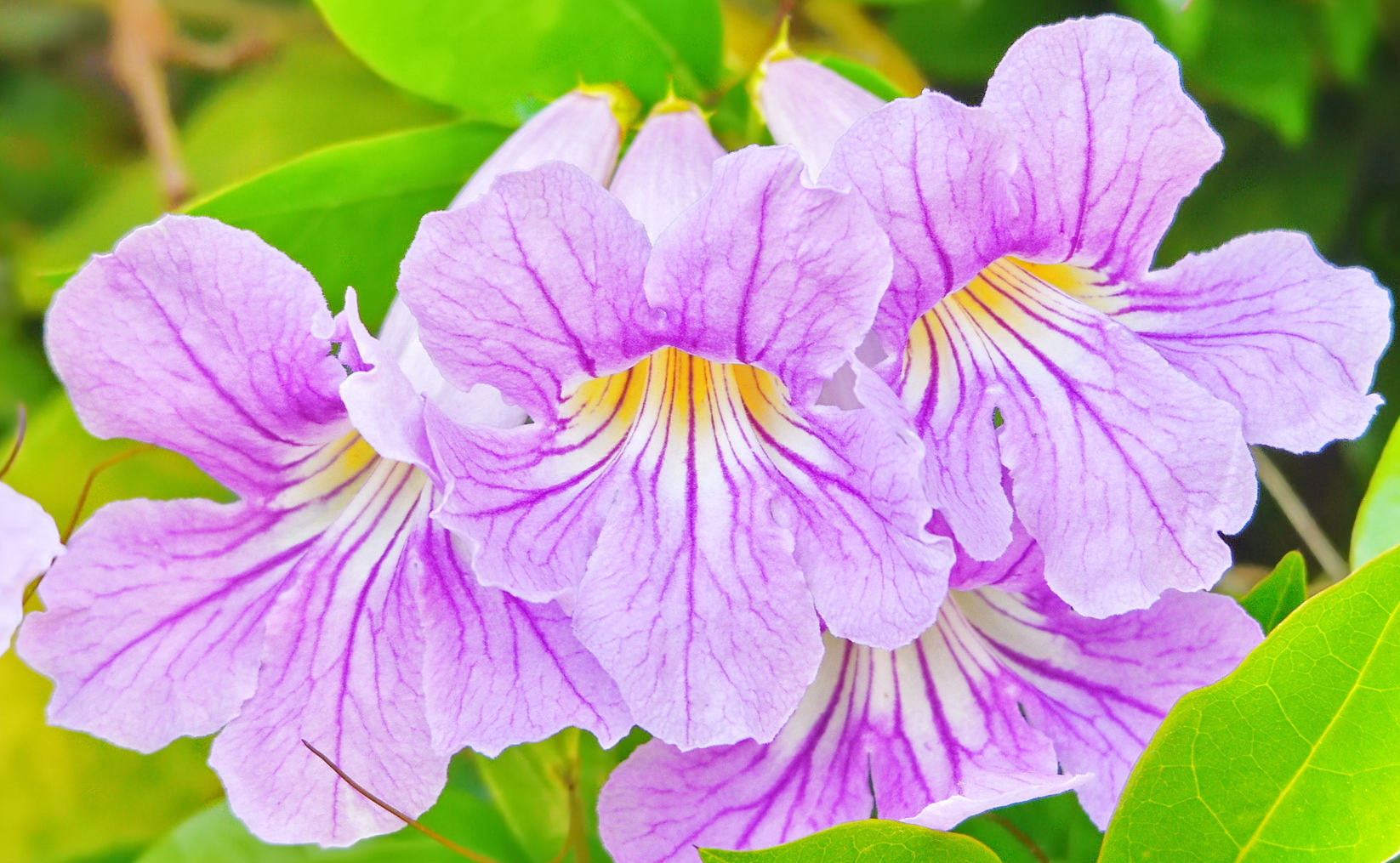
Flowers

It is a woody, evergreen perennial vine that reaches a height of 6 to 15 metres (20 to 50 feet), where it features bifoliate, hairless green leaves with tendrils.

=== Flowers ===
Its tubular flowers are lavender to lilac blue which are borne from spring to summer. They feature a white to yellow throat with conspicuous floral violet veins. The fruit is a brown capsule that produces winged seeds.

== Cultivation ==
It is a heat-loving, frost tolerant plant that is grown as an ornamental plant on trellises, arbors, pergolas, wall covers or as a sprawling groundcover. It can be grown from stem cuttings or tip layering.
