= Great Indian Bustard Sanctuary =

Wildlife sanctuary in India

Great Indian Bustard Sanctuary Maharashtra
- IUCN category IV (habitat/species management area)
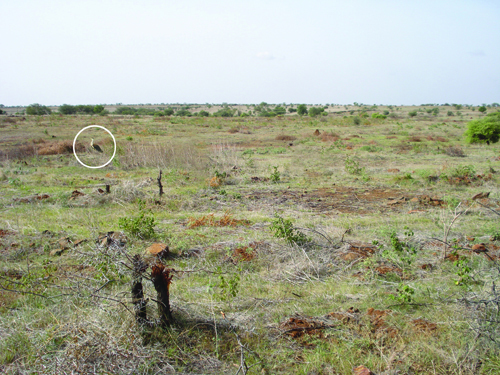

- Location within Maharashtra Location within India
- Interactive map of Great Indian Bustard Sanctuary Maharashtra
- Coordinates: 17°49′36.2″N 75°52′10.9″EGoogle Maps
- Area: 122,200 hectares (472 mi^{2})

Great Indian Bustard Sanctuary (established in 1979, also known as the Jawaharlal Nehru Bustard Sanctuary of Maharashtra) is a wildlife sanctuary for the great Indian bustard (Ardeotis nigriceps) at Solapur, Maharashtra, India. The land is drought-prone and semi-arid. It is in the Deccan thorn scrub forests ecoregion.

Maharashtra is one of the six states of India where great Indian bustards (Ardeotis nigriceps) are still seen. The great Indian bustard at Nannaj and Karmala was first identified by Mr B.S.Kulkarni in 1972 and with his constant efforts to save the bird had resulted in Dr. Salim Ali visiting Nannaj and starting a research project. Mr Kulkarni wrote extensively in local newspapers and made people aware of its existence and he is still active in trying to protect the bird and its habitat at Nannaj, near Solapur. In former days the bustard was a common bird in the dry districts of Maharashtra.

== Data on the sanctuary ==
- Coordinates - 17°49′36.2″N 75°52′10.9″E
- Year of establishment- 1979
- Size - 849,644 hectares (3,280.49 mi^{2})
- Climate - Dry, mild winter. Hot summer (40 °C to 43 °C )
- Temperature - 13 °C to 42 °C
- Topography - Gentle undulations, with isolated hillocks of 450-500 msl.
- Habitat - 6A/01 Southern Tropical Thorn Forest (Champion and Seth 1968)
- Biogeographic Zone - Deccan Peninsula
- Breeding Status - Breeds in Nannaj and some other DPAP plots.
- Nesting season - Monsoon (July–October)
- Figure of bustards according to census 2009 - Total 21 ( 13 females and 8 males)

== Drought Prone Areas Programme (DPAP) Plots ==
In 1975 the Drought Prone Areas Programme (DPAP), financed by the World Bank, was initiated in Solapur district . Establishment of pastures and woodlots by the forest department under DPAP resulted in regeneration of wildlife, benefited by the protection of their habitat (Rahamani, A. R. Final Report 1989, BNHS).

== Habitat types in Nannaj plots ==
Habitat of Nannaj can be broadly divided into five main types (Manakadan, R. and Rahmani, A. R. 1986 Annual Report No. 3, BNHS, Rahmani, A. R. Final Report 1989 BNHS).

1. Grassland plots - Mardi 100 and Mardi 50 plots are pure grassland, with few young Acacia nilotica trees and Cassia auriculata bushes. Prominent grasses are Aristida funiculate, Aristida stocksii, Chrysopogon fulvus, Heteropogon contortus, Lodhopogon tridentatus, Melanocenchris jacquemontii.
2. Woodlot (Nannaj plots)- In some of the areas the following trees were planted by the forest department: Acacia nilotica, Albizia lebbeck, Gliricidia sepium, Dalbergia sissoo, Azadirachta indica, Hardwickia binata, Sapindus emarginatus and Tamarindus indica. These plots have become extremely thick in the past years, and the grassland has been converted to woodland.
3. Grazing land
4. Stony grazing land
5. Crop fields

== Habitat utilization and preference by great Indian bustard ==
Maximum sightings of bustards are seen at pure grassland areas, and no bird is recorded in dense woodlots. Bustards prefer wide open short grass plains and open scrubland with scattered trees. Bustards need open habitat for the following purposes:

- Nesting
- Display
- Foraging
- Roosting

== Need for habitat management ==
Some of the areas like Nannaj 10 ha (close to mardi, 100 hectare) and Karamba (also close to Mardi, 50 hectare) were planted with exotic plant species like Gliricidia sepium, Azadirachta indica. Because of the dense growth of weeds like Hyptis suaveolens and Lantana camara, these areas became dense woodlands.

Pictures taken from Google Earth effectively shows how dramatically habitat has changed from scrubland and grassland to dense woodland. The idea of no tree plantain proposed by some and other are not proper there has to be some trees which are not tall and there has to be the proper grassland so that the bird can hide and fly. If the camouflage is not there the bird has chance to fall prey to poachers.

=== Recommendations ===
- No tree planting - It is believed to be better to have less trees or bushes in the core areas than to have too many of them.
- Maintenance of grassland - very thick and dense grasses are not preferred by bustards. In such cases thinning, cutting would be useful to maintain the grassland at the optimum suitability for the bustards.

These recommendations were included in management plan of the sanctuary but nothing much was done for the management of grasslands in Great Indian Bustard Sanctuary, Nannaj, Solapur.

== Removal of trees by the forest department ==
With reference to above recommendations in the management plan, Forest Department (Wildlife Division) Pune submitted a proposal to PCCF Maharashtra in 2006 for the uprooting and cutting of trees like Gliricidia and Lantana in Nannaj and Karamba areas. With allotments of funds, actual work started in March 2008 under the guidance of Conservator of Forest (Wildlife Division) Pune Dr. Y L P Rao.

Total 25 hectares of land was cleared out of trees, of which 10 hectares at Nannaj 10 ha area (near Kale Talav) and 15 hectares at Karamba (near Mardi 50 hectare). Trees like Gliricidia, Neem and Lantana were cut and then uprooted so as to prevent their regrowth. A total of 15,240 trees were uprooted from 25 hectares of land.

On 15 August 2009, an observer saw one male great Indian bustard in the newly opened Nannaj 10 (Near Kale Talav) plot. The bustard was seen foraging and the observer continued to observe the bird for about 45 minutes in 10 ha (from 7:15 to 8:00 am). Then the bustard crossed the TCM by walking and entered the Mardi 100 hectare area.

The following species of birds have been observed in newly opened areas:

- Great Indian bustard (Ardeotis nigriceps)
- Indian bushlark (Mirafra erythroptera)
- Ashy-crowned sparrow-lark (Eremopterix grisea)
- Rufous-tailed lark (Ammomanes phoenicurus)
- Southern grey shrike (Lanius meridionalis)
- Yellow-wattled lapwing (Vanellus malabaricus)
- Red-necked falcon (Falco chicquera)
- White-eyed buzzard (Butastur teesa)
- Rock bush quail (Perdicula argoondah)
- Barred buttonquail (Turnix suscitator)
- Grey francolin (Francolinus pondicerianus)
- Eurasian collared dove (Streptopelia decaocto)
- Pied bushchat (Saxicola caprata)
- Common myna (Acridotheres tristis)
- Large grey babbler (Turdoides malcolmi)
- Indian silverbill (Lonchura malabarica)

A majority of the above-mentioned species are grassland birds. These observations suggest the acceptance of newly opened habitat by great Indian bustard and also by various other bird species. The Forest Department has proposed to uproot about more 5,244 trees in Mardi, Akolekati and Karamba plots. This will help in restoration of proper habitat for bustards.

== See also ==
- Wildlife of India
- Great Indian bustard
- Kutch Bustard Sanctuary
- List of birds of India
