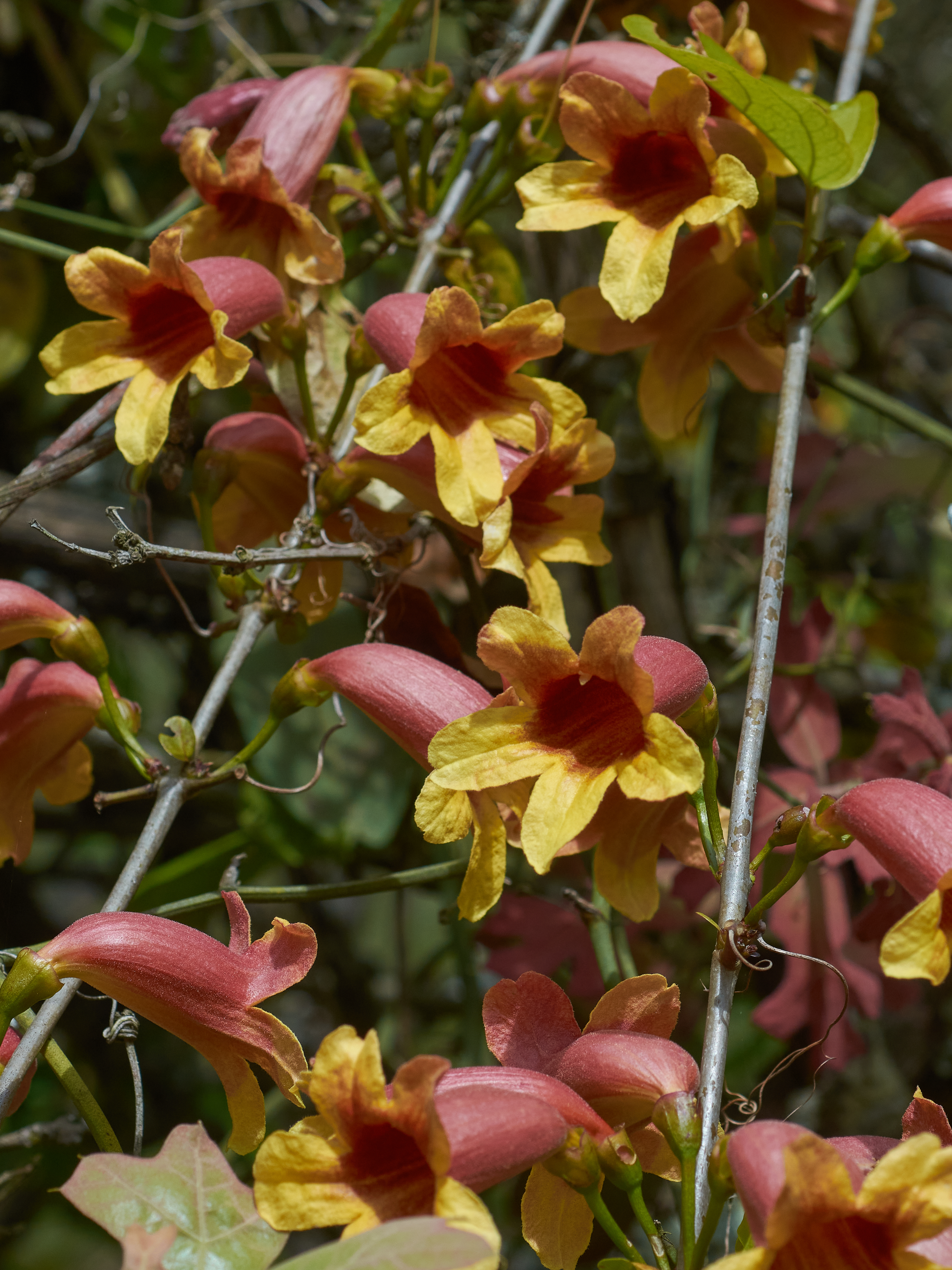

Conservation status
- Secure (NatureServe)

Scientific classification
- Kingdom: Plantae
- Clade: Tracheophytes
- Clade: Angiosperms
- Clade: Eudicots
- Clade: Asterids
- Order: Lamiales
- Family: Bignoniaceae
- Genus: Bignonia
- Species: B. capreolata

Binomial name
- Bignonia capreolata L.

Synonyms
- Anisostichus capreolata (L.) Bureau; Aristolochia durior Hill; Batocydia capreolata Mart. ex DC., pro syn.; Bignonia argyrea violascens Jacob-Makoy; Bignonia capreolata f. lutea Heineke; Bignonia capreolata var. atrosanguinea Hook.f.; Doxantha capreolata (L.) Miers; Isotrema durior (Hill) H.Huber

= Bignonia capreolata =

Species of flowering plant

Bignonia capreolata is a vine commonly referred to as crossvine. The common name refers to the cross-shaped pattern revealed when the stem is cut; this pattern results from four radial wedges of phloem embedded within the stem's xylem. It is native to the central and southern United States. The vine climbs without twining but does produce tendrils. It produces long tubular flowers which are red and yellow and frequently have a mocha fragrance. The leaves are dark green to almost purple and produced as opposite pairs with terminal tendrils. The vine often climbs very high, with leaves only remaining on the uppermost portion of the plant. Crossvine can spread aggressively through stolons and may need to be managed in garden or domestic settings.

There was for some time confusion surrounding the name of this plant, which was apparently sometimes referred to as "Bignonia crucigera", a name more properly referring to a different plant altogether.

== Description ==
=== Stems ===
The stems of Bignonia capreolata are woody, slender, and capable of extensive growth. The unique cross-shaped internal structure of the stems gives the plant its common name, "crossvine."

=== Leaves ===
Bignonia capreolata features opposite leaves, each divided into two glossy, dark green leaflets. These are connected by a central tendril with adhesive pads at its tips, allowing the plant to climb surfaces such as wood, stone, and brick without additional support. In cooler climates, the foliage turns bronze or reddish-purple during autumn.

The compound leaves of Bignonia capreolata consist of two leathery, dark green leaflets. Each leaflet is elliptic to ovate, with a smooth margin and a glossy upper surface. A tendril arises between the leaflets, terminating in small adhesive pads that enable the plant to cling to vertical surfaces.

=== Flowers ===
The flowers, which bloom from late spring to early summer, are tubular and trumpet-shaped, typically 1.5–2 inches (3.8–5 cm) long. They exhibit a vibrant orange to reddish-orange hue with yellow throats. Blooming in clusters, they are highly fragrant and serve as an essential nectar source for hummingbirds and bees.

=== Fruits and seeds ===
The fruits are elongated, flat capsules that measure 4–8 inches (10–20 cm) long. These capsules ripen in late summer, splitting open to release numerous winged seeds. This wind-dispersal mechanism enables the plant to colonize new areas effectively.

== Taxonomy ==
The genus Bignonia is named after Jean-Paul Bignon. Molecular phylogenetic studies reveal that Bignonia capreolata shares a close relationship with other climbing members of the family, such as Campsis radicans (trumpet creeper). These species likely diversified in response to ecological pressures, such as competition for sunlight in dense forests.

== Distribution and habitat ==
Native to the southeastern United States, Bignonia capreolata is commonly found in woodlands, thickets, and along riverbanks. Its range extends from Maryland and Virginia to Florida in the south and westward to Texas and Oklahoma. It is most abundant in warm, humid climates but has adapted to cooler environments in its northern range.

The plant often grows in mixed forests, where it can climb trees and shrubs to access sunlight. It is equally comfortable in suburban and urban landscapes, where it is used to create green walls and shaded areas.

Bignonia capreolata thrives in USDA hardiness zones 5 through 9. It prefers well-drained, slightly acidic soils but is adaptable to sandy, loamy, and clay soil types. While it performs best in full sun, it tolerates partial shade, though reduced sunlight may limit flower production.

== Uses ==
Due to its vibrant flowers and dense foliage, Bignonia capreolata is a popular choice for decorative purposes. It is often used to cover pergolas, arbors, fences, and walls, creating a lush, natural canopy. Its fast growth and ability to climb vertical structures make it particularly effective for landscaping projects that aim to add height or cover unsightly areas.

The vine is frequently planted for erosion control along slopes and riverbanks, where its extensive root system helps stabilize soil. It has an ability to thrive in various conditions and its tubular flowers attract hummingbirds and butterflies.

== Medicinal use ==
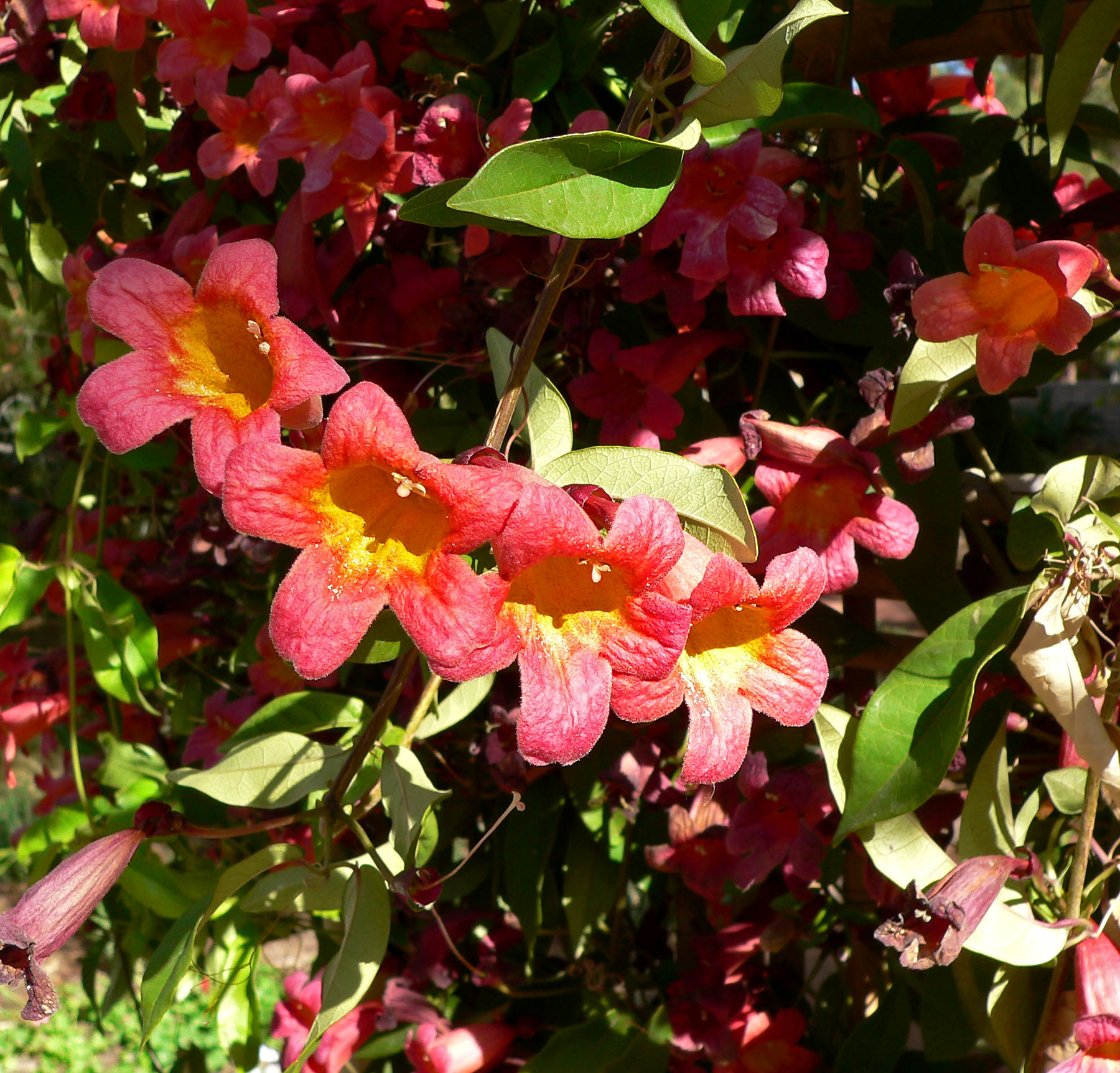
Bignonia capreolata 'Tangerine Beauty'

One 18th century report describes a medicinal use for cross-vine by the Cherokee people:

The vines or climbing stems of the climber (Bigonia Crucigera) are equally divided longitudinally into four parts by the same number of their membranes somewhat resembling a piece of white tape by which means, when the vine is cut through and divided traversely, it presents to view the likeness of a cross. This membrane is of a sweet, pleasant taste. The country people of Carolina crop these vines to pieces, together with china brier and sassafras roots, and boil them in their beer in the spring, for diet drink, in order to attenuate and purify the blood and juices. It is a principal ingredient in Howard's famous infusion for curing the yaws, etc., the virtues and use of which he obtained from Indian Doctors.

In 2012, researchers at Bastyr University published a paper revealing that they had identified the indole alkaloid reserpine in crossvine.

The vine has been used by the native Americans for many health alignments such as, to purify blood by an infusion of leaves. The bark has been smashed and used for edema and headaches and gargled the mashed root for infusion.
