= Bignonia noterophila =

Scientific classification
- Kingdom: Plantae
- Clade: Tracheophytes
- Clade: Angiosperms
- Clade: Eudicots
- Clade: Asterids
- Order: Lamiales
- Family: Bignoniaceae
- Genus: Bignonia
- Species: B. noterophila

Binomial name
- Bignonia noterophila Mart. ex DC.

Synonyms
- Adenocalymma ocositense Donn.Sm.; Arrabidaea schumanniana Huber; Bignonia purpurea Lodd. ex Hook.f.; Clytostoma elegans Standl.; Clytostoma isthmicum Pittier; Clytostoma noterophilum (Mart. ex DC.) Bureau & K.Schum.; Clytostoma ocositense (Donn.Sm.) Seibert; Clytostoma purpureum (Lodd. ex Hook.f.) Rehder; Petastoma laurifolium Kraenzl.; Petastoma multiglandulosum Kraenzl.; Petastoma ocositense (Donn.Sm.) Kraenzl.

Species of flowering plant

Bignonia noterophila is a flowering plant species in the genus Bignonia. It is native from south Mexico to northern South America.
