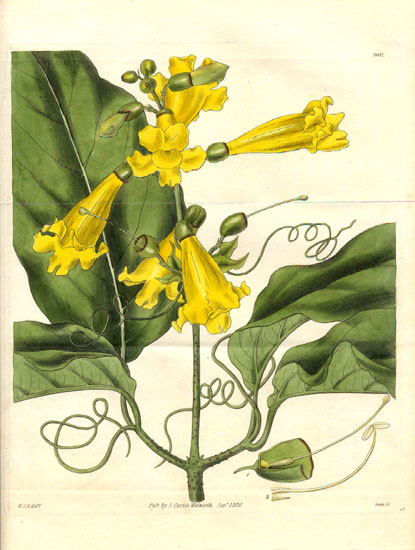
- Bignonia grandifolia

Scientific classification
- Kingdom: Plantae
- Clade: Tracheophytes
- Clade: Angiosperms
- Clade: Eudicots
- Clade: Asterids
- Order: Lamiales
- Family: Bignoniaceae
- Tribe: Bignonieae
- Genus: Bignonia; L. nom. cons.

Species
- See text

Synonyms
- Anisostichus Bureau; Clytostoma Miers ex Bureau; Clytostomanthus Pichon; Cydista Miers; Levya Bureau ex Baill.; Macranthisiphon Bureau ex K.Schum.; Micropaegma Pichon; Mussatia Bureau ex Baill.; Osmhydrophora Barb.Rodr.; Phryganocydia Mart. ex Bureau; Phrygiobureaua Kuntze; Pongelia Raf.; Potamoganos Sandwith; Roentgenia Urb.; Saritaea Dugand; Temnocydia Mart. ex DC.

= Bignonia =

Genus of flowering plants

Bignonia is a genus of flowering plants in the family Bignoniaceae. Its genus and family were named after Jean-Paul Bignon by his protégé Joseph Pitton de Tournefort in 1694, and the genus was established as part of modern botanical nomenclature in 1753 by Carl Linnaeus. Species have been recorded in a range extending from southern USA and Mexico to most of South America.

== Species ==
Species include:

- Bignonia binata Thunb.
- Bignonia bracteomana (K.Schum. ex Sprague) L.G.Lohmann
- Bignonia callistegioides Cham.
- Bignonia campanulata Cham.
- Bignonia capreolata L.
- Bignonia convolvuloides (Bureau & K.Schum.) L.G.Lohmann
- Bignonia corymbosa (Vent.) L.G.Lohmann
- Bignonia costata (Bureau & K.Schum.) L.G.Lohmann
- Bignonia cuneata (Dugand) L.G.Lohmann
- Bignonia decora (S.Moore) L.G.Lohmann
- Bignonia diversifolia Kunth
- Bignonia hyacinthina (Standl.) L.G.Lohmann
- Bignonia lilacina (A.H.Gentry) L.G.Lohmann
- Bignonia longiflora Cav.
- Bignonia magnifica W.Bull
- Bignonia microcalyx G.Mey.
- Bignonia neouliginosa L.G.Lohmann
- Bignonia nocturna (Barb.Rodr.) L.G.Lohmann
- Bignonia noterophila Mart. ex DC.
- Bignonia phellosperma (Hemsl.) L.G.Lohmann
- Bignonia potosina (K.Schum. & Loes.) L.G.Lohmann
- Bignonia prieurei DC.
- Bignonia pterocalyx (Sprague ex Urb.) L.G.Lohmann
- Bignonia ramantacea (Mart. ex DC.) L.G.Lohmann
- Bignonia sciuripabula (K.Schum.) L.G.Lohmann
- Bignonia sordida (Bureau & K.Schum.) L.G.Lohmann
- Bignonia uleana (Kraenzl.) L.G.Lohmann
