= Tungabhadra Otter Conservation Reserve =

Otter conservation reserve in India

- Interactive map of Tungabhadra Otter Conservation Reserve
- Nearest town: Hampi
- Coordinates: 15.36°N 76.51°E
- Length: 34 km (21 mi)

Tungabhadra Otter Conservation Reserve is the first otter conservation reserve in India, located near Hampi in Vijayanagara district in the state of Karnataka. This is a 34 km (21 mi) stretch along Tungabhadra River. The area is well known for smooth-coated otters and soft-shell turtles.
