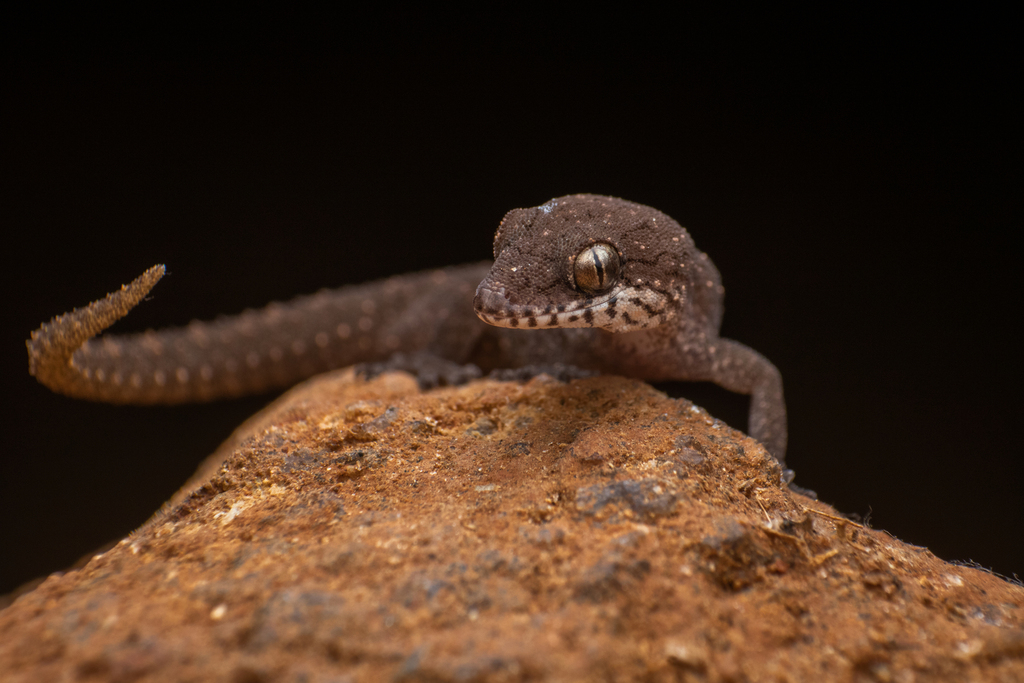

Conservation status
- Least Concern (IUCN 3.1)

Scientific classification
- Kingdom: Animalia
- Phylum: Chordata
- Class: Reptilia
- Order: Squamata
- Suborder: Gekkota
- Family: Gekkonidae
- Genus: Hemidactylus
- Species: H. reticulatus

Binomial name
- Hemidactylus reticulatus Beddome, 1870

= Reticulate leaf-toed gecko =

Species of lizard

The reticulate leaf-toed gecko (Hemidactylus reticulatus) is a species of terrestrial, nocturnal, insectivorous gecko found in rocky areas of South India. It takes refuge under stones on ground during day time and emerges out at night for its activities.

== Description ==
Head short, oviform, very convex; snout a little longer than the distance between the eye and the ear-opening and than the diameter of the orbit; forehead not concave; ear-opening small, roundish. Body and limbs short. Digits short, free, with very short distal joints, moderately dilated; 5 or 6 lamella under the inner digits, 7 or 8 under the fourth finger, and 8 or 9 under the fourth toe. Snout covered with keeled granules; the rest of the head with smaller granules intermixed with round tubercles. Rostral four-sided, not twice as broad as deep, with median cleft above; nostril pierced between the rostral, the iirsfc labial, and three or four nasals; 9 or 10 upper and 7 to 9 lower labials: mental large, triangular or pentagonal; four chin-shields, inner pair largest and in contact behind the point of the mental. Body covered above with coarse granules intermixed with numerous irregularly arranged, small, round, keeled tubercles. Abdominal scales rather small, cycloid, imbricate, smooth. Male with 6 to 9 preanal pores forming an angular series. Tail cylindrical, tapering, covered above with small granular scales and rings of six or eight large conical tubercles, beneath with uniform small imbricated scales. Brown above, with a network of darker lines; many of the tubercles whitish; lower surfaces whitish, the throat sometimes veriniculated with brown.

== Distribution ==
Southern India (Karnataka, Tamil Nadu, Telangana and Andhra Pradesh). This species is very partial to rocky hillocks and outcrops and occurs from near sea level to over 1000 m. Type locality: Kollegal, Mysore State.
