= Bignonia binata =

Scientific classification
- Kingdom: Plantae
- Clade: Tracheophytes
- Clade: Angiosperms
- Clade: Eudicots
- Clade: Asterids
- Order: Lamiales
- Family: Bignoniaceae
- Genus: Bignonia
- Species: B. binata

Binomial name
- Bignonia binata Thunb., Pl. Bras. 3: 35. 1821.

Synonyms
- Adenocalymma ocositense Donn.Sm. Arrabidaea schumanniana Huber; Bignonia eximia Morong; Bignonia noterophila DC. Bignonia purpurea Lodd. ex Hook.f. Bignonia umbellulata DC. Clytostoma binatum (Thunb.) Sandwith; Clytostoma elegans Standl. Clytostoma isthmicum Pittier; Clytostoma noterophilum (DC.) Bureau & K.Schum. Petastoma multiglandulosum Kraenzl.

Species of flowering plant

Bignonia binata is a flowering plant species in the genus Bignonia.
