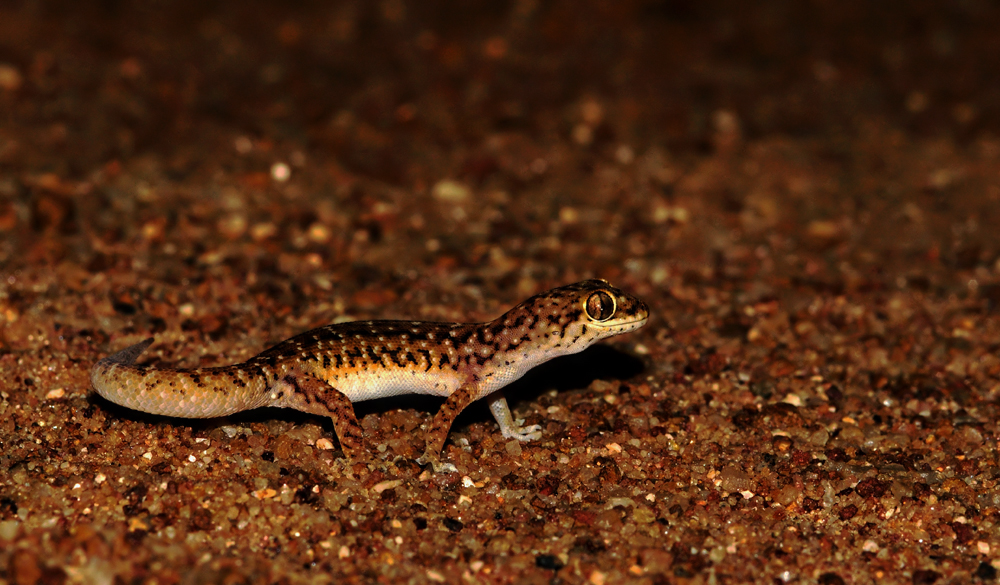
- Adult individual from Tamil Nadu

Conservation status
- Endangered (IUCN 3.1)

Scientific classification
- Kingdom: Animalia
- Phylum: Chordata
- Class: Reptilia
- Order: Squamata
- Suborder: Gekkota
- Family: Gekkonidae
- Genus: Hemidactylus
- Species: H. scabriceps

Binomial name
- Hemidactylus scabriceps (Annandale, 1906)
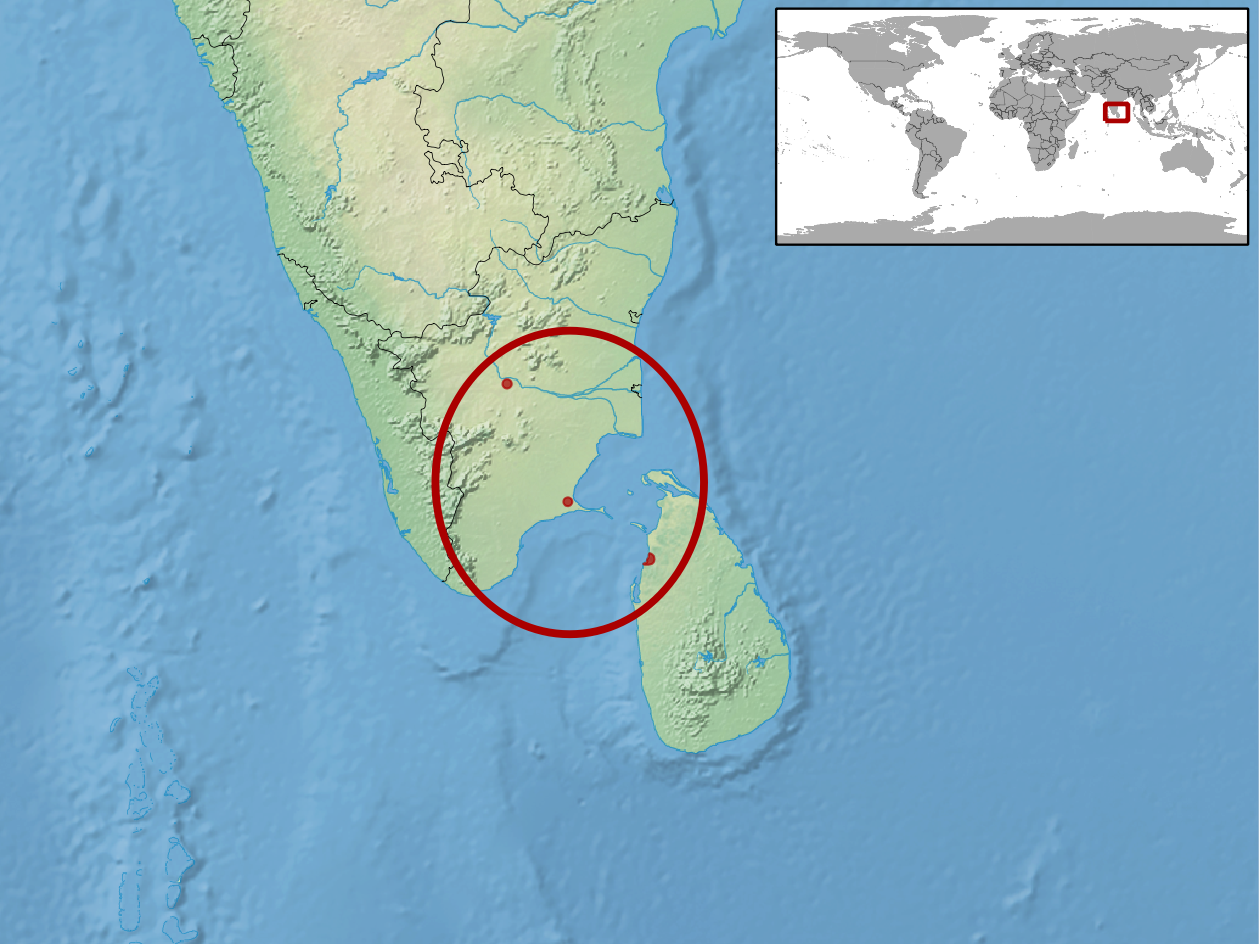

= Scaly gecko =

Species of lizard

The scaly gecko (Hemidactylus scabriceps) is a species of nocturnal, terrestrial, insectivorous gecko found in South India and northern Sri Lanka. This species was first discovered in the coastal sand dunes of Ramanathapuram in Tamil Nadu. Subsequently, it was incorrectly identified and only recently, elaborate descriptions and molecular data are available, enabling a proper identification.

== Description ==
Adults of this species are relatively short and stout; forehead appears convex; snout, blunt and rounded, larger than the eyes; limbs short; a cylindrical tail, tapers towards the tip. Dorsal surface of head and neck covered with overlapping scales which are small, rounded and granular. Mental scale large; eyes laterally placed, large having a vertical pupil; iris brown; small yellow scales surrounding the eyes. Supralabial scales: 7 to 8 and infralabial scales: 6 to 8; a pair of nostrils between rostral scales. Scales on dorsum similar to those on the belly, are distinctly imbricate, leaf-shaped and almost smooth; scales increase in size from snout towards the tail with the largest scales found just above limbs and on the tail. Femoral pores absent; adult males have up to 6 pre-anal pores; the fourth toe appears subdigital and divided partially.

== Color in life ==
Overall, brownish but varying between yellow and red hue on dorsum, fading into a creamy white venter. The lateral portion having an indistinct pattern of mottling with black and bright yellow scales. Head mottled with white and black scales. Labial scales are straw yellow. Scales around the eye are yellow. Two parallel lines along the dorsum starting from the base of forelimbs and terminating near the tail. White crossbands along the dorsum. Limbs brown, mottled with black and white.

== Distribution ==
This species predominantly occupies semi-arid and open habitats which are dry and sometimes sandy. They are found in Tamil Nadu in South India and in north western parts of Sri Lanka. In India, this species has been observed in the following areas: Ramnad, Adyar, Chennai, Mayiladuthurai, Madurai, Thanjavur, Tirunelveli, Tuticorin, and Vallanadu Wildlife Sanctuary. In Sri Lanka, it has been reported in Marichhukate in Northern Province.

== Natural history ==
Nocturnal in habit, they are found under rocks during daytime. At night, they are seen on the open ground, moving about with an upright stance. Females with two eggs have been observed in July and between December–February. They are found in dry habitats including along the coastal sand dunes. Individuals are thought to be territorial with two males making a 'chirping call' accompanied by an arched body, stretched legs and waving their tails while lunging at the neck of the other individual occasionally.

== Evolutionary history ==
In the absence of molecular evidence, this species was incorrectly assigned to different genera; however, recent phylogenetic analysis has placed this species in the genus Hemidactylus. This species is thought to have diverged from its common ancestor around 35 million years ago and its range expansion into Sri Lanka is likely to have happened in the Late Miocene.
