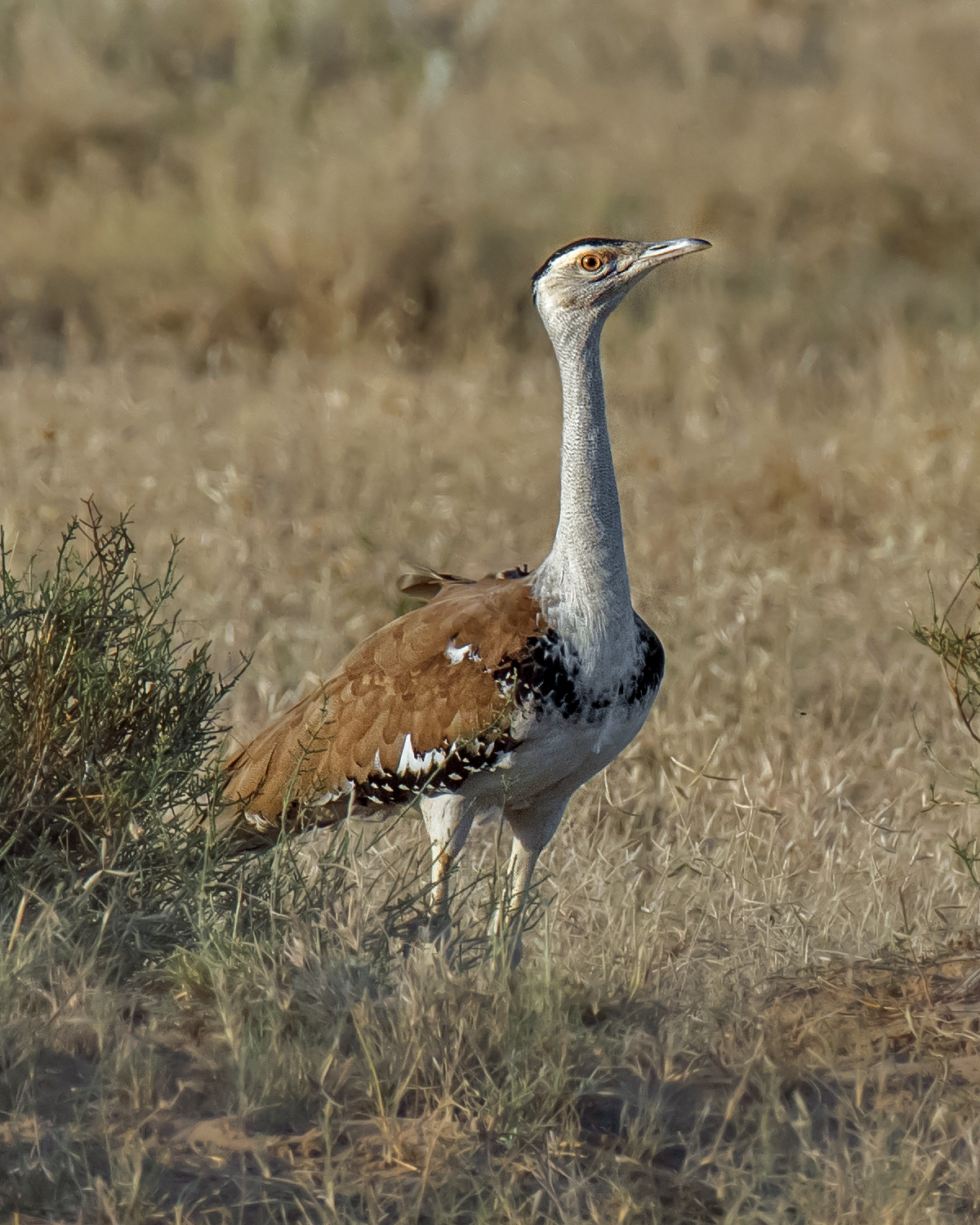
- At Desert National Park
- Breeding call recorded in Great Indian Bustard Sanctuary

Conservation status
- Critically Endangered (IUCN 3.1)
- CITES Appendix I

Scientific classification
- Kingdom: Animalia
- Phylum: Chordata
- Class: Aves
- Order: Otidiformes
- Family: Otididae
- Genus: Ardeotis
- Species: A. nigriceps

Binomial name
- Ardeotis nigriceps (Vigors, 1831)
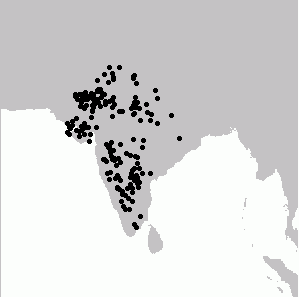
- Points where the species has been recorded. Once widespread, the species is today found mainly in central and western India.

Synonyms
- Choriotis nigriceps, Eupodotis edwardsi, Otis nigriceps

= Great Indian bustard =

Species of bird

The great Indian bustard (Ardeotis nigriceps) or Indian bustard is a bustard occurring on the Indian subcontinent. It is a large bird with a horizontal body, long bare legs and is among the heaviest of the flying birds. Once common on the dry grasslands and shrubland in India, as few as 150 individuals were estimated to survive as of 2018, reduced from an estimated 250 individuals in 2011. It is critically endangered due to hunting and habitat loss. It is protected under the Indian Wild Life (Protection) Act, 1972.

== Description ==
The great Indian bustard is a large ground bird with a height of about one metre. It is unmistakable with its black cap contrasting with the pale head and neck. The body is brownish with a black patch spotted in white. The male is deep sandy buff coloured and during the breeding season has a black breast band. The crown of the head is black and crested and is puffed up by displaying males. In the female which is smaller than the male, the head and neck are not pure white and the breast band is either rudimentary, broken or absent.

Measurements

All populations
Length	♂	1,000–1,070 mm (39.4–42.1 in)
	♀	760–830 mm (29.9–32.7 in)
Culmen		85–95 mm (3.3–3.7 in)
Wing	♂	614–762 mm (24.2–30.0 in)
	♀	460–540 mm (18.1–21.3 in)
Tail	♂	330–380 mm (13.0–15.0 in)
	♀	245–270 mm (9.6–10.6 in)
Head	♂	170–180 mm (6.7–7.1 in)
	♀	145–155 mm (5.7–6.1 in)
Weight	♂	8–14.5 kg (17.6–32.0 lb)
	♀	2.5–6.75 kg (5.5–14.9 lb)
Foot	♂	275–300 mm (10.8–11.8 in)
	♀	225–245 mm (8.9–9.6 in)

Among bustards, this species is smaller only than the Kori bustard and the great bustard in size. It is also the largest land bird in its native range. The great Indian bustard stands at about 1 m (3 ft 3 in) tall, having a somewhat long neck and quite long legs. The female as in most members of the bustard family are typically considerably smaller.

Males have a well-developed gular pouch which is inflated when calling during display and helps produce the deep resonant calls.

Abnormally leucistic or near albino birds have been reported.

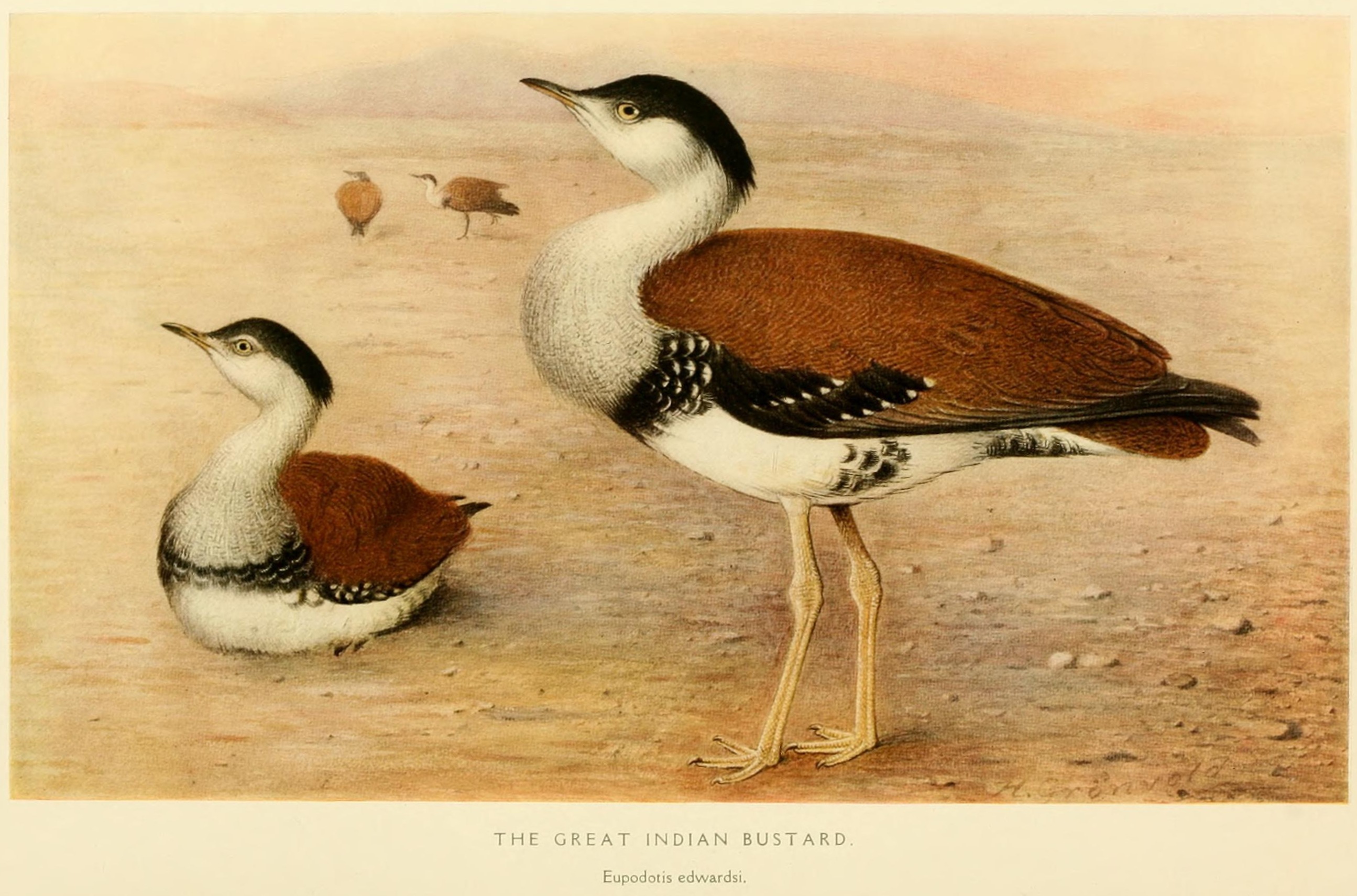
Illustration by Henrik Grönvold from E. C. Stuart Baker's Game-birds of India, Burma and Ceylon

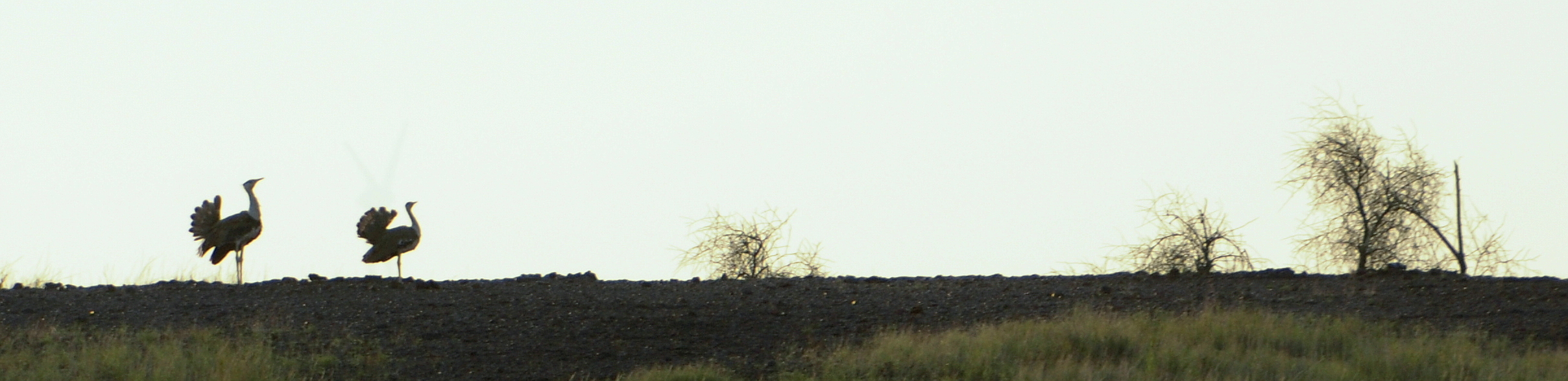
Male and female in display, Rajasthan

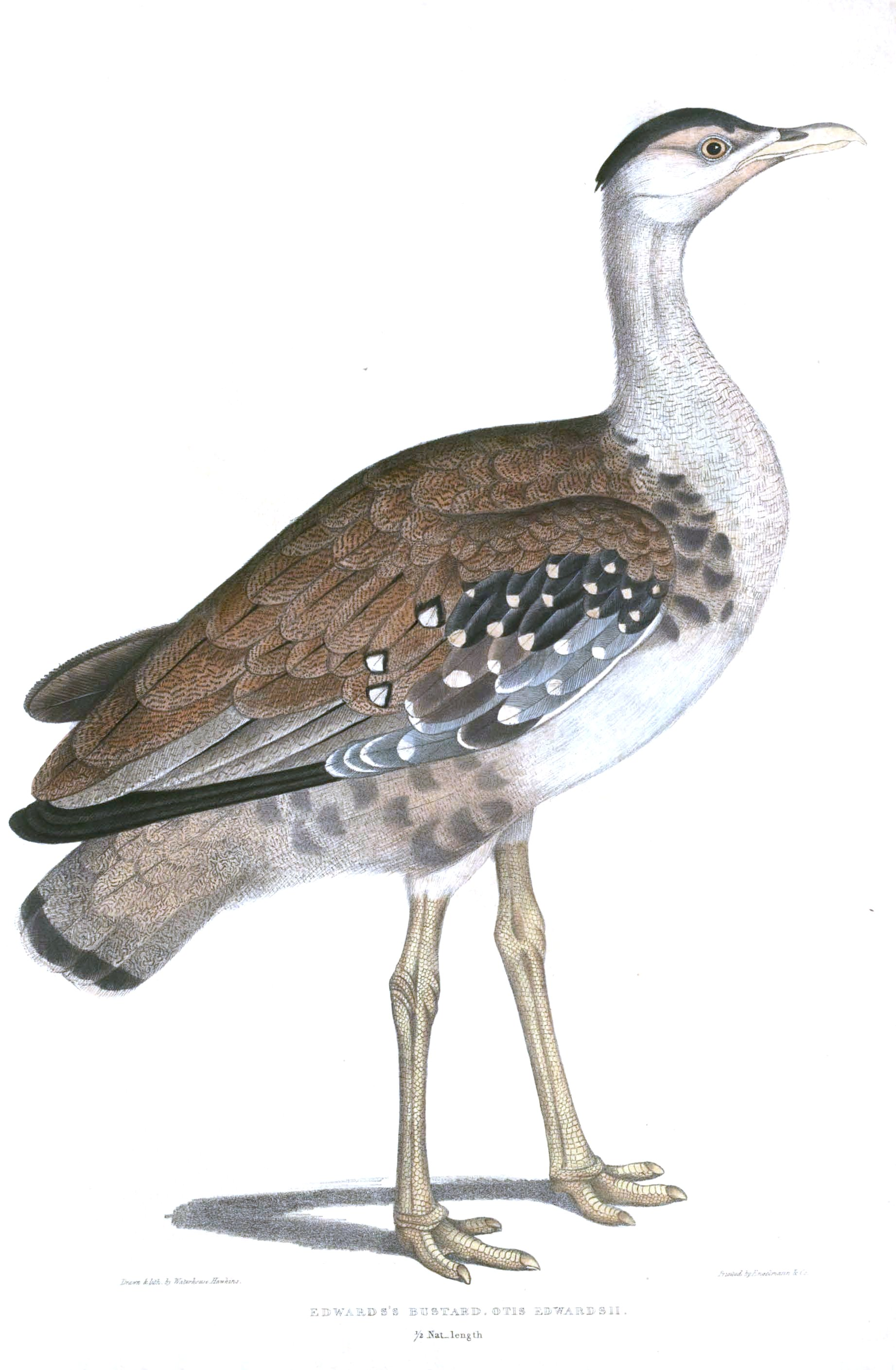
From Thomas Hardwicke's Illustrations of Indian Zoology (1830–1835)

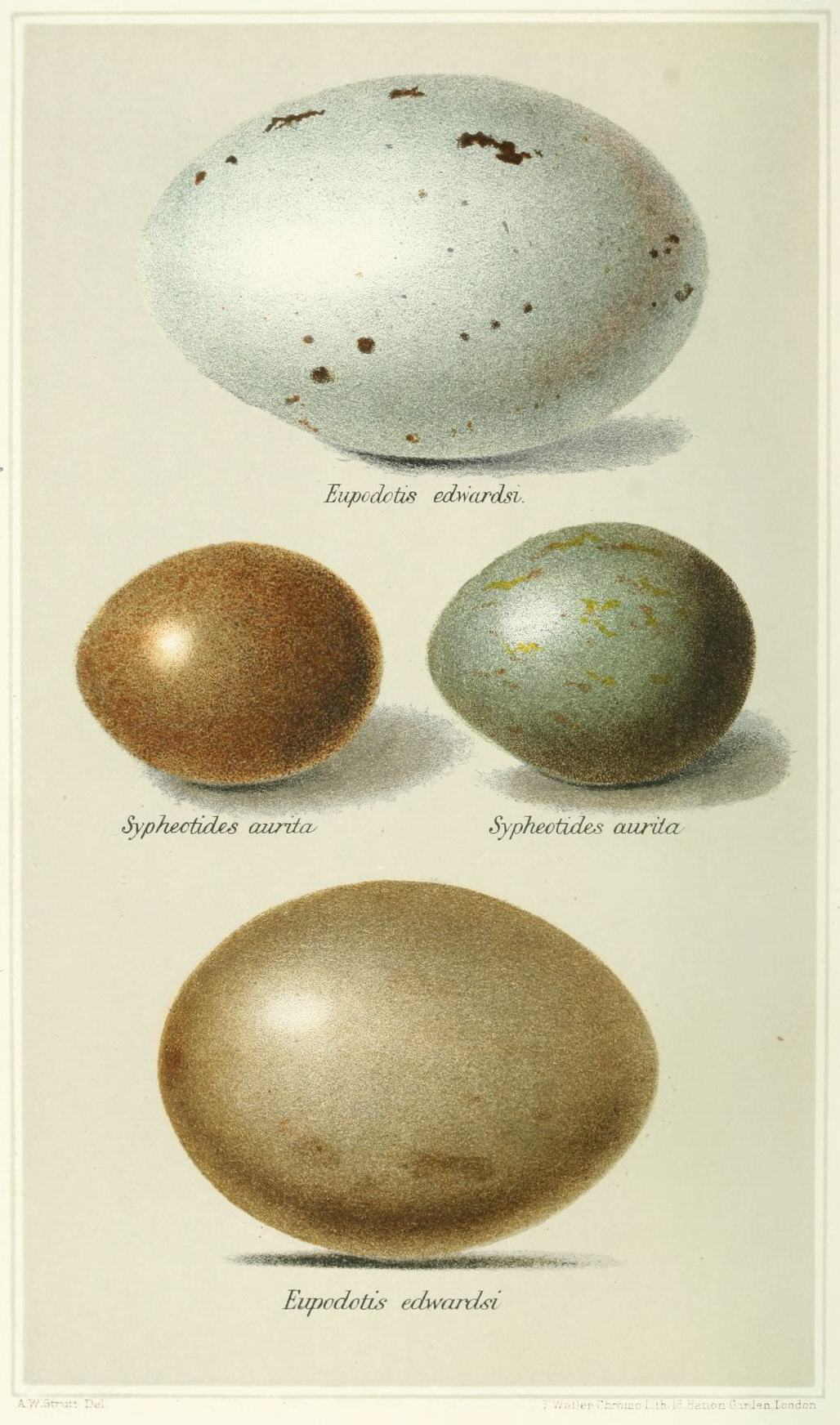
Eggs of the species in comparison to the smaller ones of the lesser florican

== Distribution and habitat ==
The great Indian bustard was formerly widespread in India and Pakistan. In India, it historically occurred in Punjab, Haryana, Uttar Pradesh, Madhya Pradesh, Chhattisgarh, Odisha, Andhra Pradesh, Rajasthan, Gujarat, Maharashtra, Karnataka and Tamil Nadu. Today the bustard is restricted to isolated pockets in Andhra Pradesh, Gujarat, Karnataka, Maharashtra, Madhya Pradesh and Rajasthan (shared with Pakistan).

Today, the great Indian bustard occurs in Rajasthan, Karnataka, Maharashtra, Madhya Pradesh and Gujarat states of India. Desert National Park, near Jaisalmer and coastal grasslands of the Abdasa and Mandvi talukas of Kutch District of Gujarat support some populations. Ghatigaon and Karera sanctuaries in Madhya Pradesh once held sizeable populations. Other sanctuaries with the species include Kutch Bustard Sanctuary of Naliya in Kutch, Karera Wildlife Sanctuary in Shivpuri district; Great Indian Bustard Sanctuary near Nannaj, It was also sighted near Solapur in Maharashtra, Shrigonda taluka in Ahmednagar district, near Nagpur and near Warora in Chandrapur district in Maharashtra and Rollapadu Wildlife Sanctuary, and near Kurnool in Andhra Pradesh. A few birds were detected in a September 2013 survey of the Cholistan Desert in Pakistan.

The great Indian bustard lives in arid, semi-arid grasslands, open country with thorn scrub, and tall grass interspersed with cultivation. It avoids irrigated areas. The major areas where it is known to breed are in central and western India and eastern Pakistan. The dry semi-desert regions of parts of Rajasthan have been transformed by irrigation canals into an intensively farmed area.

== Behaviour and ecology ==
The great Indian bustard is omnivorous. It prefers insects, consisting mainly of Orthoptera, but also beetles including Mylabris species. It also consumes grass seeds, berries, largely of the genera Ziziphus and Eruca, rodents and reptiles; in Rajasthan, it also hunts Indian spiny-tailed lizards Uromastyx hardwickii. In cultivated areas, it feeds on crops such as exposed groundnut, millets and pods of legumes. It drinks water if available and sometimes sits down to drink or suck water followed by raising up its heads at an angle. When threatened, hens are said to carry young chicks under the wing. Young birds have been recorded to dust-bathe frequently.

The male is polygamous. During the breeding season, it is solitary, but congregates to small flocks in winter. It is thought to use a mating system that has been termed as an "exploded or dispersed lek".

Great Indian bustards make local movements but these are not well understood; flocks disperse after the monsoon.

Breeding occurs between March and September, when the inflated fluffy white feathers of the male are inflated and displayed. Territorial fights between males may involve strutting next to each other, leaping against each other with legs against each other and landing down to lock the opponent's head under their neck. During courtship display, the male inflates the gular sac which opens under the tongue, inflating it so that a large wobbly bag appears to hang down from the neck. The tail is held cocked up over the body. The male also raises the tail and folds it on its back. The male periodically produces a resonant deep, booming call that may be heard for nearly 500m. The female lays a single egg in an unlined scrape on the ground. Only the females are involved in incubation and care of the young. The eggs are at risk of destruction from other animals particularly ungulates and crows. Females may use a distraction display that involves flying zigzag with dangling legs.

== Threats ==
The great Indian bustard is listed as Critically Endangered on the IUCN Red List since 2011. It has been extirpated in 90% of its former range, and the population was estimated at perhaps fewer than 250 individuals in 2008. The main threats are hunting and habitat loss. In the past they were heavily hunted for their meat and for sport and, today, poaching of the species may continue. In some places, such as Rajasthan, increased irrigation by the Indira Gandhi canal has led to increased agriculture and the altered habitat has led to the disappearance of the species from these regions. Current threats to the species include the development of linear infrastructure intrusions such as roads and electric power transmission lines in the desert that lead to collision-related mortality. Proposed expansion of renewable energy infrastructure, which may involve deploying solar panels over large areas of desert and grasslands is another threat to the bird's habitat. Some populations migrate into Pakistan where hunting pressure is high. The great Indian bustard is critically endangered in Pakistan primarily due to lack of protection and rampant hunting.

At Ranibennur Blackbuck Sanctuary, habitat changes have affected wildlife populations. In the 1950s, the scrub forest was replaced with Eucalyptus plantations. These helped wildlife when the trees were short but after their extensive growth they made the adjoining grassland less favourable for bustards.

== Conservation ==
The state of Rajasthan initiated the "Project Great Indian Bustard" on World Environment Day 2013, identifying and fencing off bustard breeding grounds in existing protected areas as well as provide secure breeding enclosures outside protected areas. A soft-release centre for the great Indian bustard was inaugurated at Naliya in Gujarat's Kutch district on 14 September 2026 by Union Minister for Environment, Forest and Climate Change Bhupender Yadav. The facility is equipped with infrastructure to support the conservation, monitoring and gradual adaptation of the birds to the natural environment.

In 2020, nine chicks were incubated successfully creating a world record. In 2024, a chick was hatched following artificial insemination of a female with sperm collected from a male 200 km (120 mi) away. In March and April 2025, eight chicks hatched out at the Sam Bustard conservation and breeding centre and the Ramdevra breeding centre.

In October 2026, a male great Indian bustard chick was confirmed at Naliya in Kutch, Gujarat.

== Evolution ==
The variability in mitochondrial DNA of the great Indian bustard showed low genetic diversity in 63 samples collected in five Indian states. This indicates a historical population reduction estimated to have happened about 20–40,000 years ago.

== In culture ==
The Mughal emperor Babur noted that "[while] the flesh of the leg of some fowls, and of the breast of others is excellent; the flesh of every part of the Kharchal is delicious". The great Indian bustard was however a cryptic and wary bird making it a challenge for sportsmen, who had to stalk carefully (sometimes using covered bullock carts) to get within range. British soldiers in India considered it a delicacy and the species was among the top game-birds. William Henry Sykes notes that they were common in the Deccan region where a "gentleman" had shot a thousand birds. Stuart Baker however noted that this may have been an exaggeration. Jerdon noted that subadults and females had tastier flesh than males while Salim Ali notes that feeding on Mylabris (now Hycleus) tainted their flesh.

Tribal Bhils are claimed to have used a technique for trapping females that involves setting twigs on fire around the nest containing an egg or chick. The female was then said to run to the nest and singe its wings upon which the tribals captured it. Other trapping methods involving the use of nooses are described by Hume in his "Game Birds of India". The invention of the Jeep changed the method of hunting and it became extremely easy for hunters to chase bustards down in their open semi-desert habitats.

The name hoom is used in parts of Maharashtra and is derived from the low booming call. The sharp barking alarm call leads to its name of hookna in some parts of northern India. It is known in some other parts as Gaganbher or Gurayin for the resemblance of other calls to thunder or the roar of a tiger.

When the "national bird" of India was under consideration, the great Indian bustard was a proposed candidate (strongly supported by the Indian ornithologist Salim Ali), but dropped in favour of the Indian peafowl with at least one reason being the potential for being misspelt.

The 2026 handcrafted stop-motion short film The Godawan, directed by Suresh Eriyat, follows the history of the species, with a focus on its revival story. The film was constructed using over 5,200 ceramic pieces inspired by the Blue pottery of Jaipur.
