= List of wildlife sanctuaries of India =

Wildlife sanctuaries in India

A wildlife sanctuary in India is a protected area of importance for flora, fauna, or features of geological or other interest, which is reserved and managed for conservation and to provide opportunities for study or research. The Wild Life (Protection) Act, 1972 provides for the establishment of protected areas in India.

Wildlife sanctuaries of India, are classified as IUCN Category IV protected areas. As of March 2025, 573 wildlife sanctuaries have been established, covering 123,762.56 km^{2} (47,784.99 sq mi). Among these, Project Tiger governs 53 tiger reserves, which are of special significance for the conservation of the Bengal tiger. Additionally, there are 33 elephant reserves covering 80,778 km^{2} (31,189 sq mi) established under the Project Elephant, some of which overlap with the boundaries of declared wildlife sanctuaries and tiger reserves.

Established in 1936, Vedanthangal Bird Sanctuary in Tamil Nadu was the first bird sanctuary in the country and the Mudumalai Wildlife Sanctuary was established later in 1940. Spanning 7,506.22 km^{2} (2,898.17 sq mi), Kutch Desert Wildlife Sanctuary in Gujarat is the largest wildlife sanctuary in the country and spanning just 2.0 km^{2} (0.77 sq mi), Kutch Bustard Sanctuary in Gujarat is the smallest wildlife sanctuary in the country. Andaman and Nicobar Islands has the most number of wildlife sanctuaries (97).

== State/UT wise summary ==
State/UT wise summary
State/UT	State area (km^{2})	Wildlife Sanctuaries	Area (km^{2})	% of State area
Andhra Pradesh	160,229	13	6,771.40	4.23
Arunachal Pradesh	83,743	13	7,614.56	9.0
Assam	78,438	17	1,728.95	2.20
Bihar	94,163	12	2,851.67	3.03
Chhattisgarh	135,191	11	3,760.28	2.78
Goa	3,702	6	647.91	17.50
Gujarat	196,022	23	16,618.42	8.48
Haryana	44,212	7	118.21	0.27
Himachal Pradesh	55,673	28	6,115.97	10.99
Jharkhand	79,714	11	1,955.82	2.45
Karnataka	191,791	35	7,923.23	4.13
Kerala	38,863	18	2,156.21	5.55
Madhya Pradesh	308,245	24	7,046.19	2.29
Maharashtra	307,713	48	7,592.30	2.47
Manipur	22,327	7	708.14	3.17
Meghalaya	22,429	4	94.11	0.42
Mizoram	21,081	9	1,359.75	6.45
Nagaland	16,579	4	43.91	0.26
Odisha	155,707	19	7,094.65	4.56
Punjab	50,362	13	326.60	0.65
Rajasthan	342,239	25	5,592.38	1.63
Sikkim	7,096	7	399.10	5.62
Tamil Nadu	130,058	33	7,096.54	5.46
Telangana	114,840	9	5,672.70	4.94
Tripura	10,486	4	603.64	5.76
Uttar Pradesh	240,928	26	5,822.20	2.42
Uttarakhand	53,483	7	2,690.12	5.03
West Bengal	88,752	16	1,440.18	1.62
Andaman & Nicobar Islands	8,249	97	395.60	4.80
Chandigarh	114	2	26.01	22.82
Dadra and Nagar Haveli and Daman and Diu	603	2	94.36	15.48
Delhi	1,483	1	19.61	1.32
Jammu and Kashmir	163,090	14	1,815.04	1.11
Ladakh	59,146	2	9,000.00	15.22
Lakshadweep	32	1	0.01	0.03
Puducherry	480	1	3.90	0.81
Total	3,287,263	573	123,762.56	3.76

== Andaman and Nicobar Islands ==
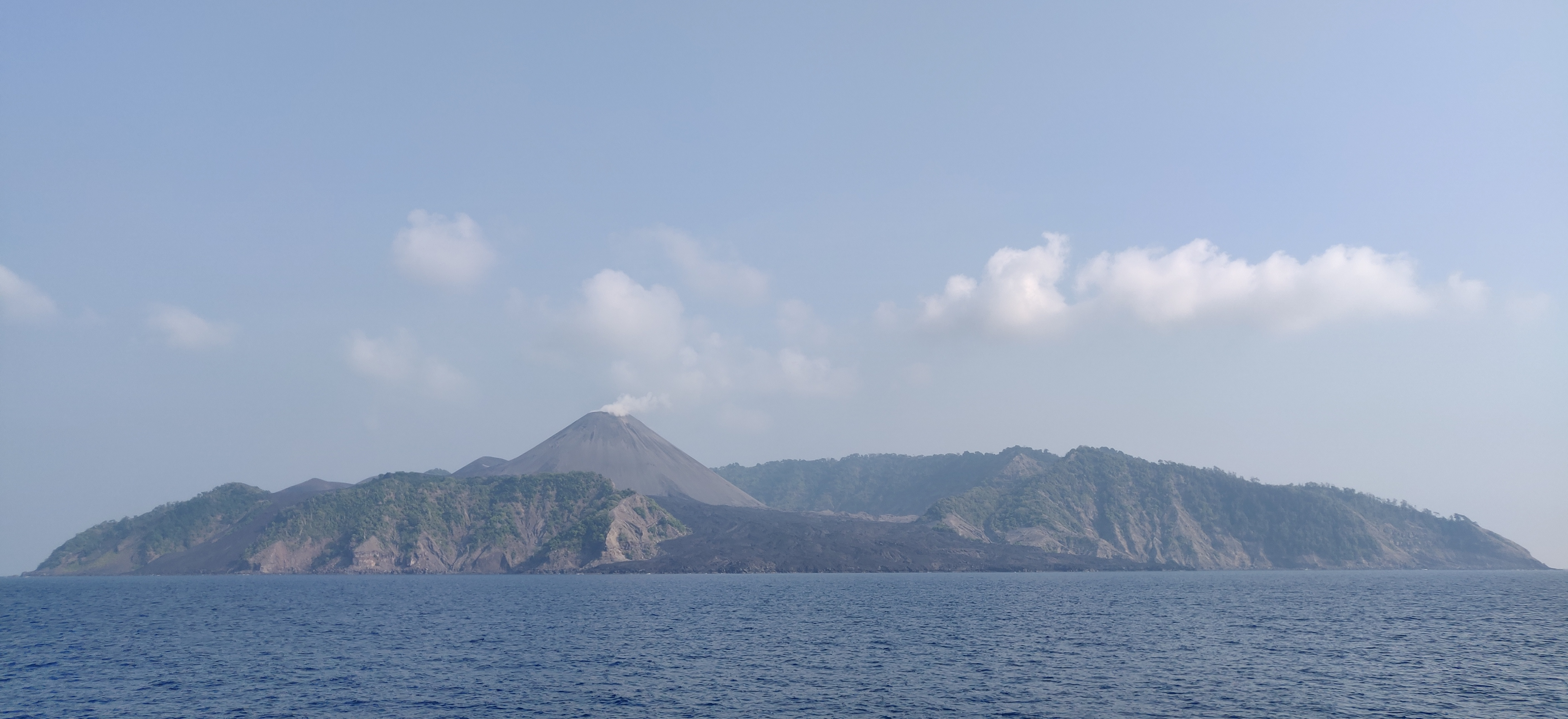
Barren Island Wildlife Sanctuary

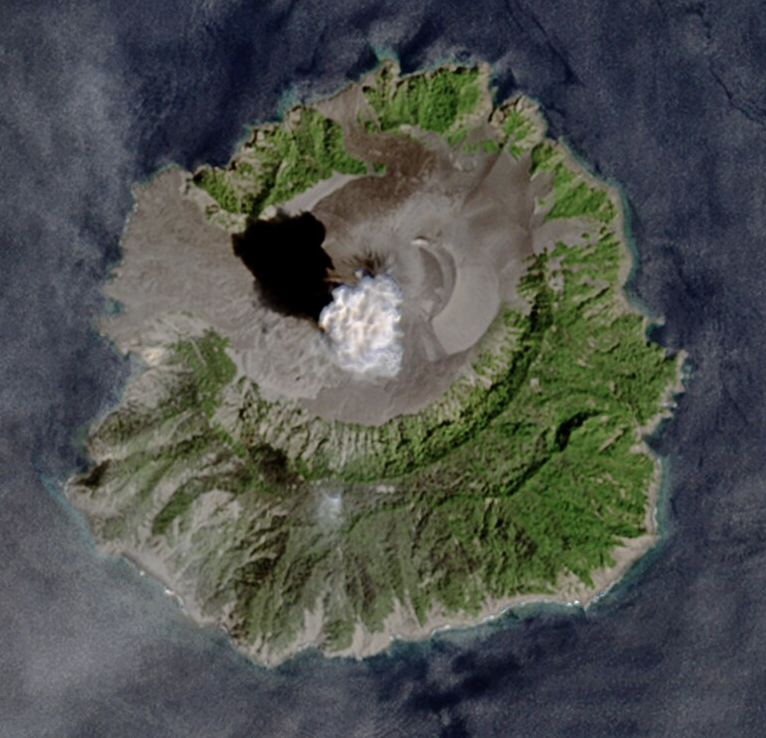
Barren Island has the only active volcano in India.

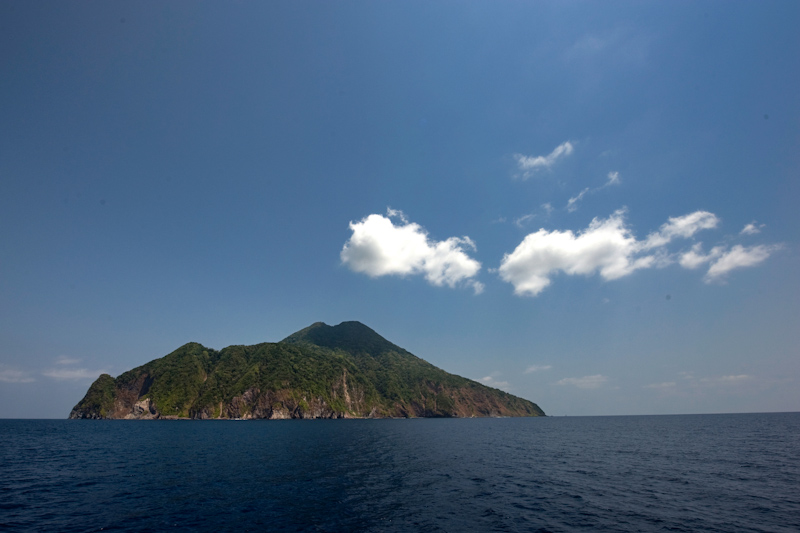
Narcondam Island Wildlife Sanctuary

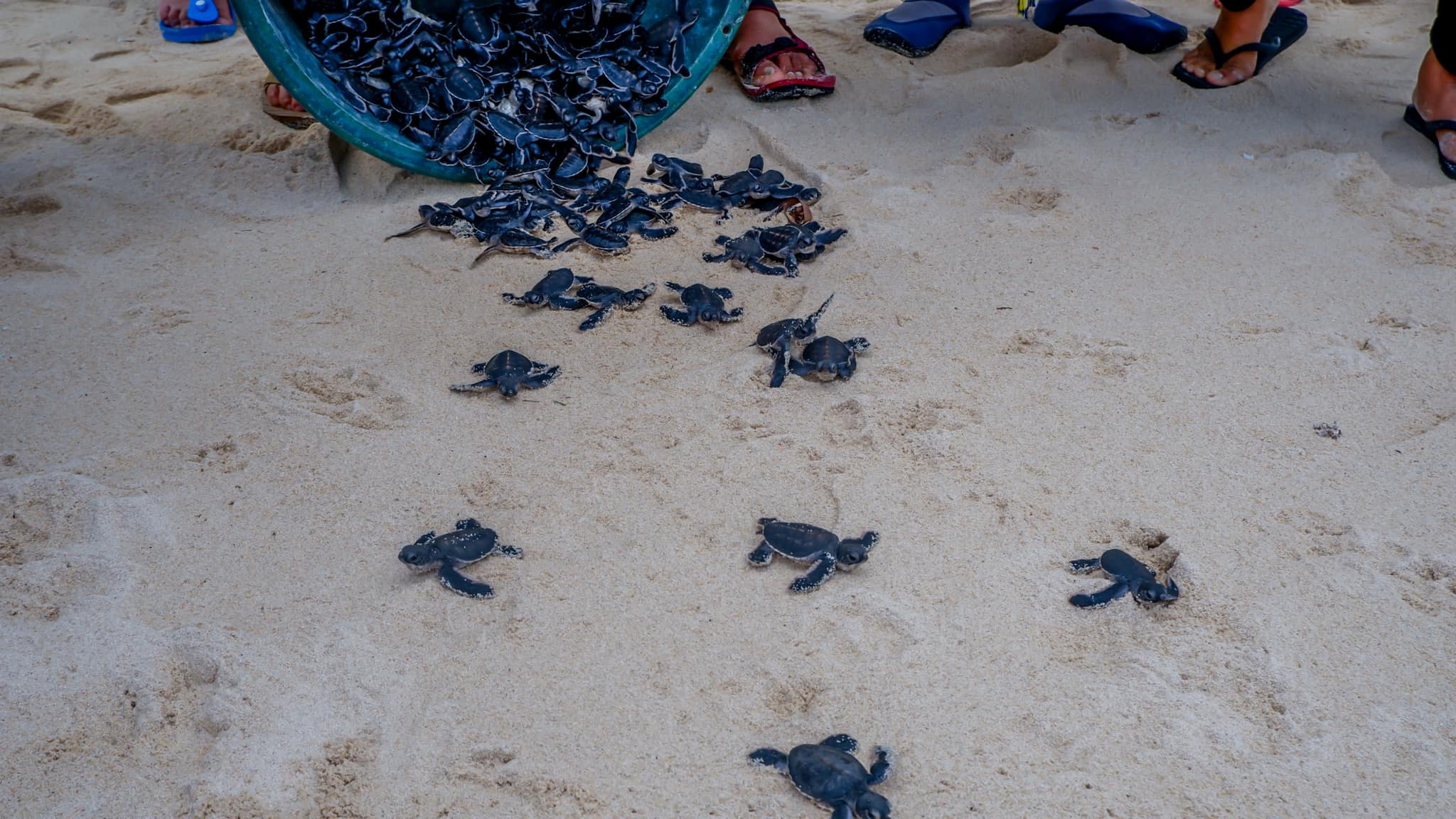
Turtle hatchlings at Turtle Islands Wildlife Sanctuary

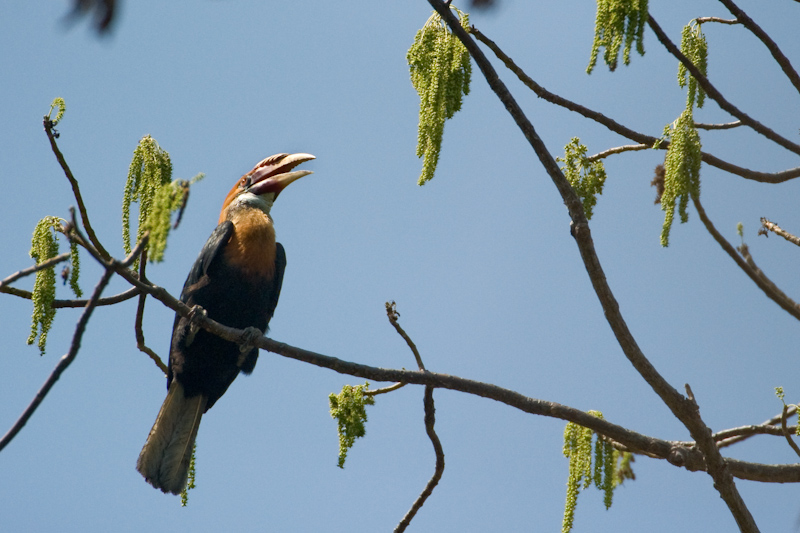
Endemic Narcondam hornbill at Narcondam Island Wildlife Sanctuary.

Wildlife Sanctuaries in Andaman and Nicobar Islands
Sanctuary	Declared	Area (km^{2})	District
Arial Island Wildlife Sanctuary	1987	0.05	Andaman
Bamboo Island Wildlife Sanctuary	1987	0.05	Andaman
Barren Island Wildlife Sanctuary	1987	8.1	Andaman
Battimalv Island Wildlife Sanctuary	1987	2.23	Nicobar
Belle Island Wildlife Sanctuary	1987	0.08	Andaman
Benett Island Wildlife Sanctuary	1987	3.46	Andaman
Bingham Island Wildlife Sanctuary	1987	0.08	Andaman
Blister Island Wildlife Sanctuary	1987	0.26	Andaman
Bluff Island Wildlife Sanctuary	1987	1.14	Andaman
Bondoville Island Wildlife Sanctuary	1987	2.55	Andaman
Brush Island Wildlife Sanctuary	1987	0.23	Andaman
Buchanan Island Wildlife Sanctuary	1987	9.33	Andaman
Chanel Island Wildlife Sanctuary	1987	0.13	Andaman
Cinque Islands Wildlife Sanctuary	1987	9.51	Andaman
Clyde Island Wildlife Sanctuary	1987	0.54	Andaman
Cone Island Wildlife Sanctuary	1987	0.65	Andaman
Curlew (B.P.) Island Wildlife Sanctuary	1987	0.16	Andaman
Curlew Island Wildlife Sanctuary	1987	0.03	Andaman
Cuthbert Bay Wildlife Sanctuary	1997	5.82	Andaman
Defence Island Wildlife Sanctuary	1987	10.49	Andaman
Dot Island Wildlife Sanctuary	1987	0.13	Andaman
Dottrell Island Wildlife Sanctuary	1987	0.13	Andaman
Duncan Island Wildlife Sanctuary	1987	0.73	Andaman
East Island Wildlife Sanctuary	1987	6.11	Andaman
East of Inglis Island Wildlife Sanctuary	1987	3.55	Andaman
Egg Island Wildlife Sanctuary	1987	0.05	Andaman
Entrance Island Wildlife Sanctuary	1987	0.96	Andaman
Flat Island Wildlife Sanctuary	1987	9.36	Andaman
Gander Island Wildlife Sanctuary	1987	0.05	Andaman
Girjan Island Wildlife Sanctuary	1987	0.16	Andaman
Galathea Bay Wildlife Sanctuary	-	11.44	Nicobar
Goose Island Wildlife Sanctuary	1987	0.01	Andaman
Hump Island Wildlife Sanctuary	1987	0.47	Andaman
Interview Island Wildlife Sanctuary	1987	133.87	Andaman
James Island Wildlife Sanctuary	1987	2.1	Andaman
Jungle Island Wildlife Sanctuary	1987	0.52	Andaman
Kwangtung Island Wildlife Sanctuary	1987	0.57	Andaman
Kyd Island Wildlife Sanctuary	1987	8	Andaman
Landfall Island Wildlife Sanctuary	1987	29.48	Andaman
Latouche Island Wildlife Sanctuary	1987	0.96	Andaman
Lohabarrack Wildlife Sanctuary	1987	22.21	Andaman
Mangrove Island Wildlife Sanctuary	1987	0.39	Andaman
Mask Island Wildlife Sanctuary	1987	0.78	Andaman
Mayo Island Wildlife Sanctuary	1987	0.1	Andaman
Megapode Island Wildlife Sanctuary	1987	0.12	Nicobar
Montogemery Island Wildlife Sanctuary	1987	0.21	Andaman
Narcondam Island Wildlife Sanctuary	1987	6.81	Andaman
North Brother Island Wildlife Sanctuary	1987	0.75	Andaman
North Island Wildlife Sanctuary	1987	0.49	Andaman
North Reef Island Wildlife Sanctuary	1987	3.48	Andaman
Oliver Island Wildlife Sanctuary	1987	0.16	Andaman
Orchid Island Wildlife Sanctuary	1987	0.1	Andaman
Ox Island Wildlife Sanctuary	1987	0.13	Andaman
Oyster Island‑I Wildlife Sanctuary	1987	0.08	Andaman
Oyster Island‑II Wildlife Sanctuary	1987	0.21	Andaman
Paget Island Wildlife Sanctuary	1987	7.36	Andaman
Parkinson Island Wildlife Sanctuary	1987	0.34	Andaman
Passage Island Wildlife Sanctuary	1987	0.62	Andaman
Patric Island Wildlife Sanctuary	1987	0.13	Andaman
Peacock Island Wildlife Sanctuary	1987	0.62	Andaman
Pitman Island Wildlife Sanctuary	1987	1.37	Andaman
Point Island Wildlife Sanctuary	1987	3.07	Andaman
Potanma Islands Wildlife Sanctuary	1987	0.16	Andaman
Ranger Island Wildlife Sanctuary	1987	4.26	Andaman
Reef Island Wildlife Sanctuary	1987	1.74	Andaman
Roper Island Wildlife Sanctuary	1987	1.46	Andaman
Ross Island Wildlife Sanctuary	1987	1.01	Andaman
Rowe Island Wildlife Sanctuary	1987	0.01	Andaman
Sandy Island Wildlife Sanctuary	1987	1.58	Andaman
Sea Serpent Island Wildlife Sanctuary	1987	0.78	Andaman
Shark Island Wildlife Sanctuary	1987	0.6	Andaman
Shearme Island Wildlife Sanctuary	1987	7.85	Andaman
Sir Hugh Rose Island Wildlife Sanctuary	1987	1.06	Andaman
Sisters Island Wildlife Sanctuary	1987	0.36	Andaman
Snake Island‑I Wildlife Sanctuary	1987	0.73	Andaman
Snake Island‑II Wildlife Sanctuary	1987	0.03	Andaman
South Brother Island Wildlife Sanctuary	1987	1.24	Andaman
South Reef Island Wildlife Sanctuary	1987	1.17	Andaman
South Sentinel Island Wildlife Sanctuary	1987	1.61	Andaman
Spike Island‑I Wildlife Sanctuary	1987	0.42	Andaman
Spike Island‑II Wildlife Sanctuary	1987	11.7	Andaman
Stoat Island Wildlife Sanctuary	1987	0.44	Andaman
Surat Island Wildlife Sanctuary	1987	0.31	Andaman
Swamp Island Wildlife Sanctuary	1987	4.09	Andaman
Table (Delgarno) Island Wildlife Sanctuary	1987	2.29	Andaman
Table (Excelsior) Island Wildlife Sanctuary	1987	1.69	Andaman
Talabaicha Island Wildlife Sanctuary	1987	3.21	Andaman
Temple Island Wildlife Sanctuary	1987	1.04	Andaman
Tillongchang Island Wildlife Sanctuary	1985	16.83	Nicobar
Tree Island Wildlife Sanctuary	1987	0.03	Andaman
Trilby Island Wildlife Sanctuary	1987	0.96	Andaman
Tuft Island Wildlife Sanctuary	1987	0.29	Andaman
Turtle Islands Wildlife Sanctuary	1987	0.39	Andaman
West Island Wildlife Sanctuary	1987	6.4	Andaman
Wharf Island Wildlife Sanctuary	1987	0.11	Andaman
White Cliff Island Wildlife Sanctuary	1987	0.47	Andaman

== Andhra Pradesh ==
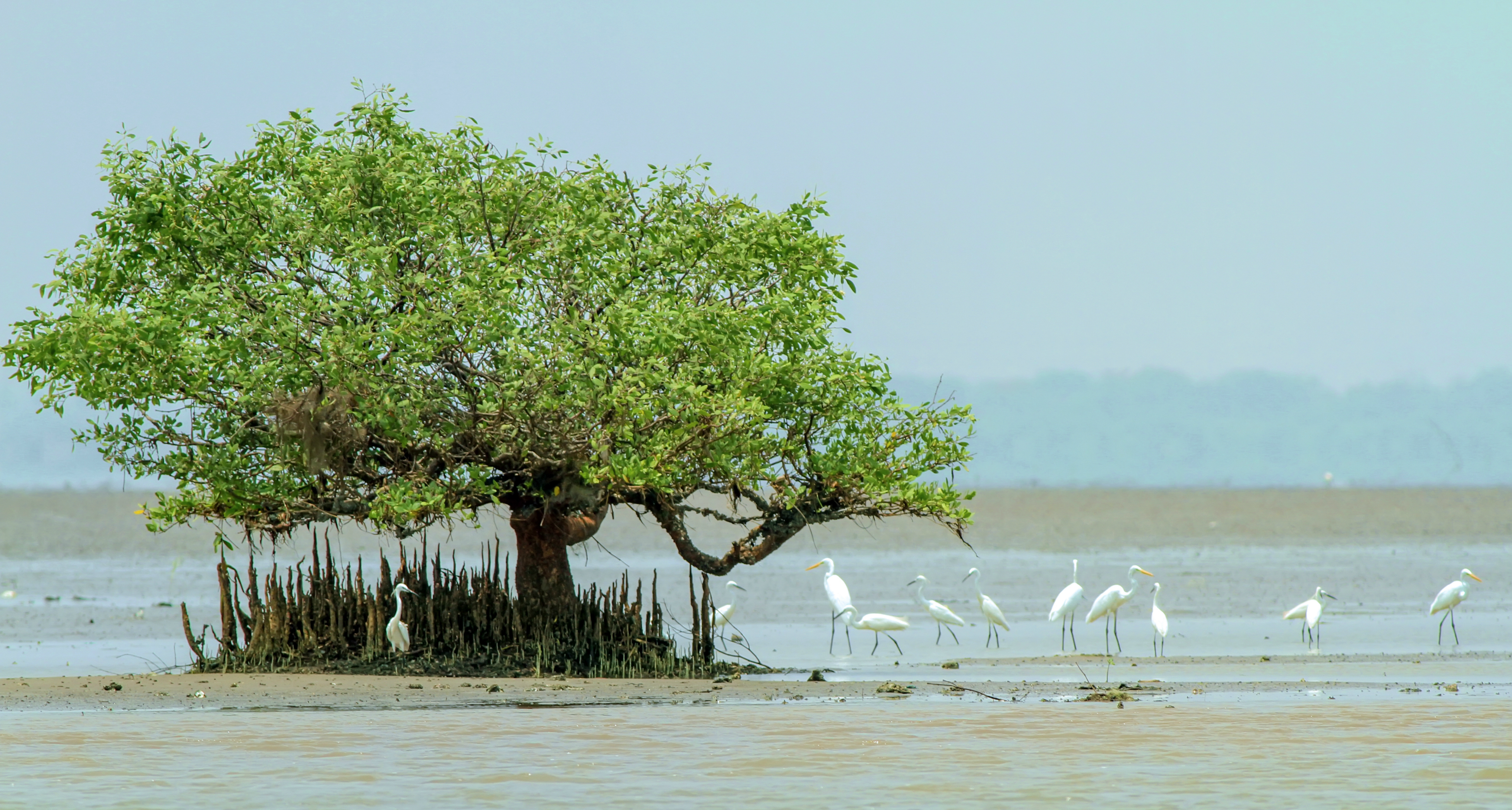
Birds at Godavari River estuary in Coringa Wildlife Sanctuary

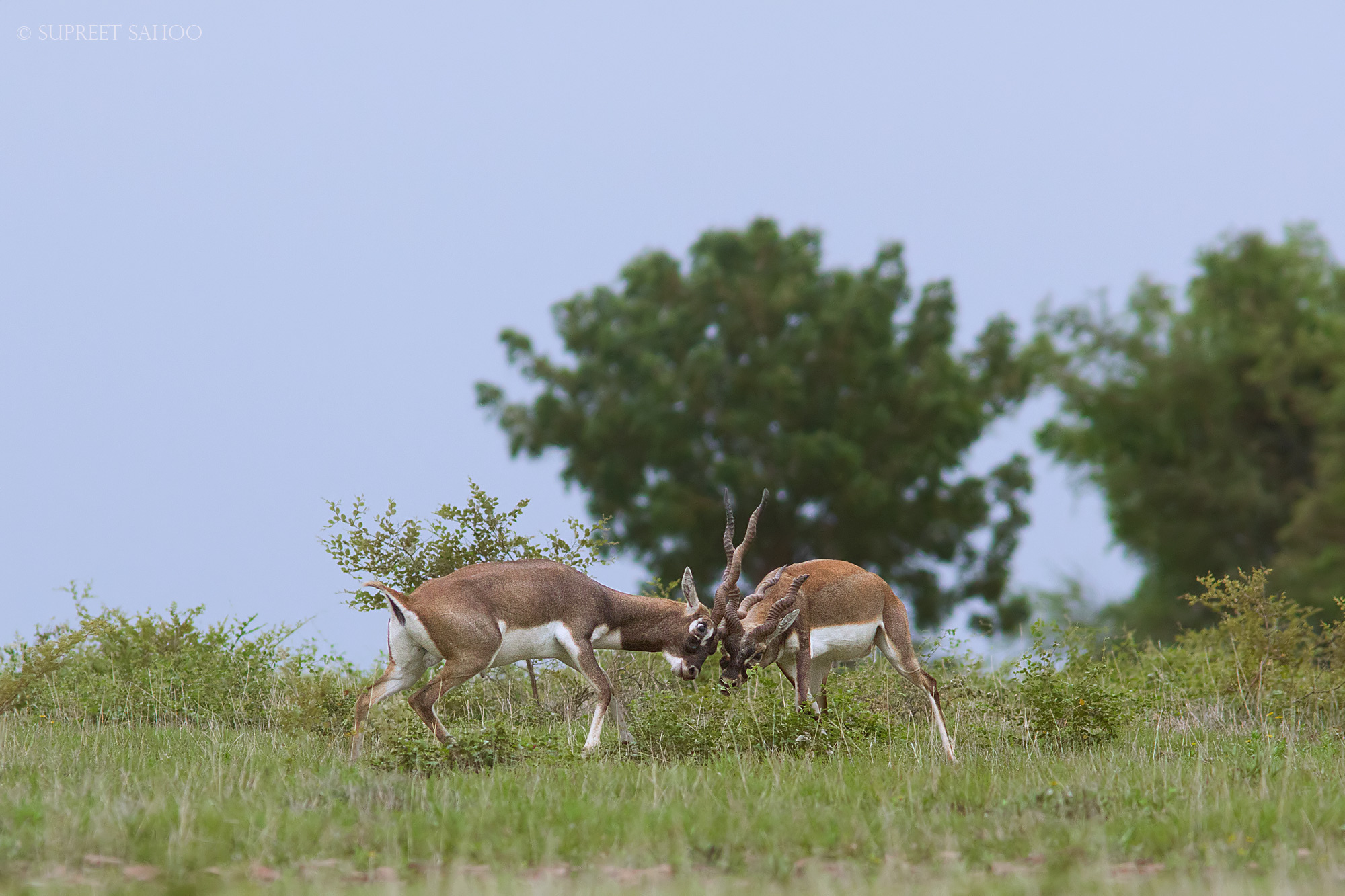
Blackbucks at Rollapadu Sanctuary

Wildlife Sanctuaries in Andhra Pradesh
Sanctuary	Declared	Area (km^{2})	District
Coringa Wildlife Sanctuary	1978	235.7	East Godavari
Gundla Brahmeswaram Wildlife Sanctuary	1990	1193.68	Kurnool, Prakasam
Kambalakonda Wildlife Sanctuary	2002	71.39	Visakhapatnam
Koundinya Wildlife Sanctuary	1990	357.6	Chittoor
Kolleru Wildlife Sanctuary	1953	308.55	Krishna, West Godavari
Krishna Wildlife Sanctuary	1989	194.81	Guntur, Krishna
Nagarjunsagar-Srisailam Tiger Reserve	1978	2131.31	Nandyal, Palnadu, Prakasam
Nelapattu Bird Sanctuary	1976	4.59	Tirupati
Pulicat Lake Bird Sanctuary	1976	600	Tirupati
Rollapadu Wildlife Sanctuary	1988	6.14	Nandyal
Sri Lankamalleswara Wildlife Sanctuary	1988	464.43	Kadapa
Sri Penusila Narasimha Wildlife Sanctuary	1997	1030.85	Nellore
Sri Venkateswara Wildlife Sanctuary	1985	172.35	Tirupati

== Arunachal Pradesh ==
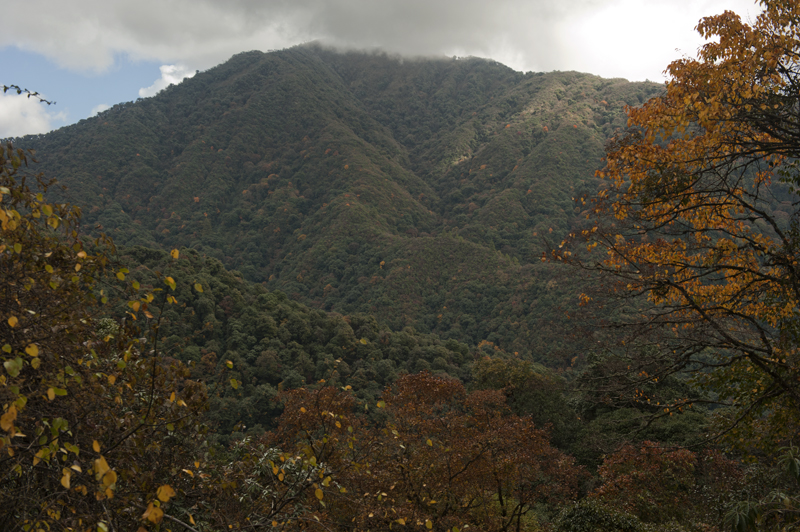
Eaglenest Wildlife Sanctuary

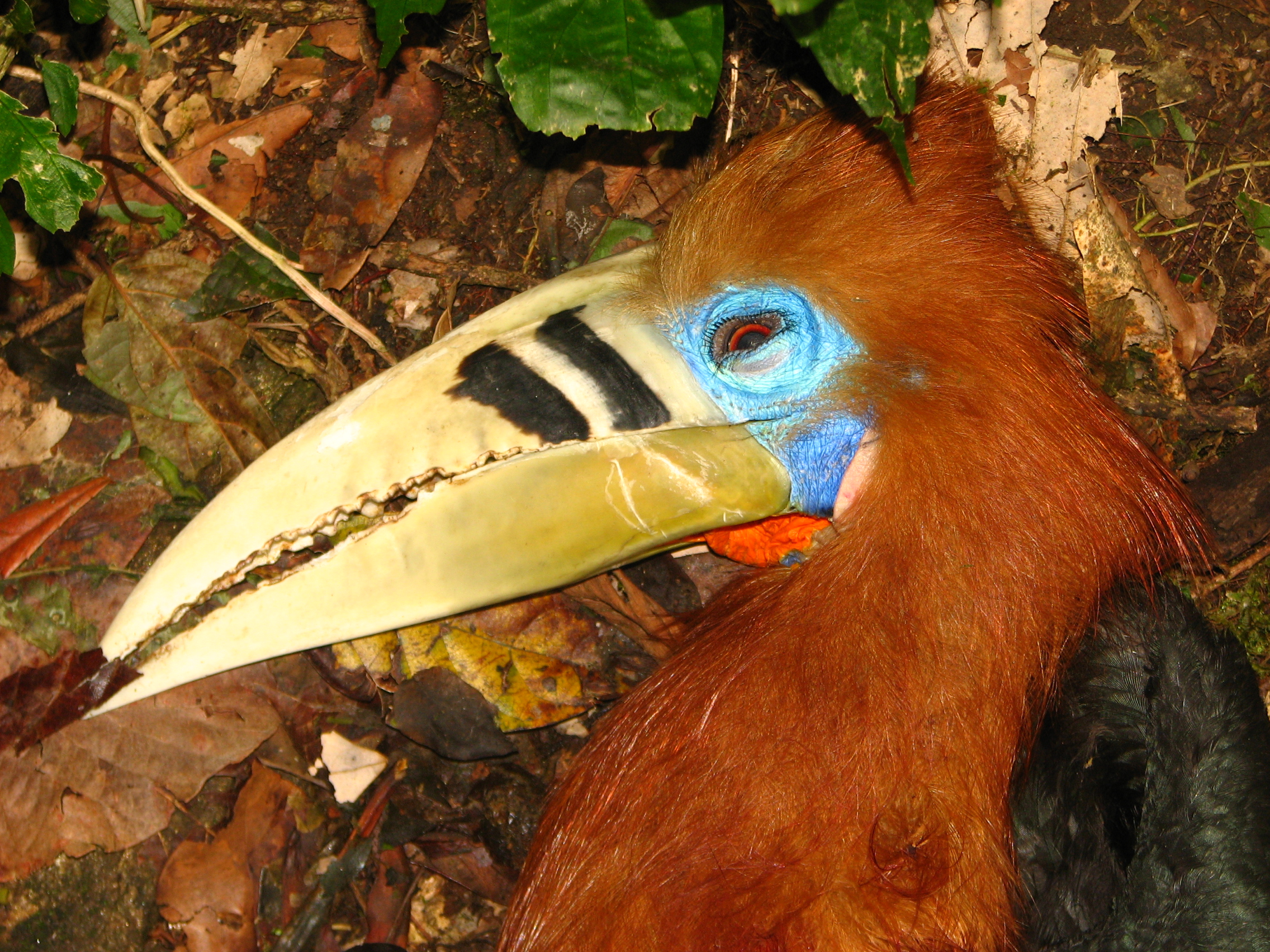
Rufous-necked Hornbill in Mehao

Wildlife Sanctuaries in Arunachal Pradesh
Sanctuary	Declared	Area (km^{2})	District
D'Ering Memorial Wildlife Sanctuary	1978	190	East Siang
Dibang Wildlife Sanctuary	1991	4149	Dibang Valley
Eaglenest Wildlife Sanctuary	1989	217	West Kameng
Itanagar Wildlife Sanctuary	1978	140.3	Papum Pare
Kamala Wildlife Sanctuary	2015	77.61	Upper Subansiri
Kamlang Wildlife Sanctuary	1989	783	Lohit
Kane Wildlife Sanctuary	1991	31	West Siang
Mehao Wildlife Sanctuary	1980	281.5	Dibang Valley
Pakke Tiger Reserve	1977	861.95	East Kameng
Ringba-Roba Wildlife Sanctuary	2015	49.2	East Kameng
Sessa Orchid Wildlife Sanctuary	1989	100	West Kameng
Talle Valley Wildlife Sanctuary	1995	337	Lower Subansiri
Yordi Rabe Supse Wildlife Sanctuary	1996	397	West Siang

== Assam ==
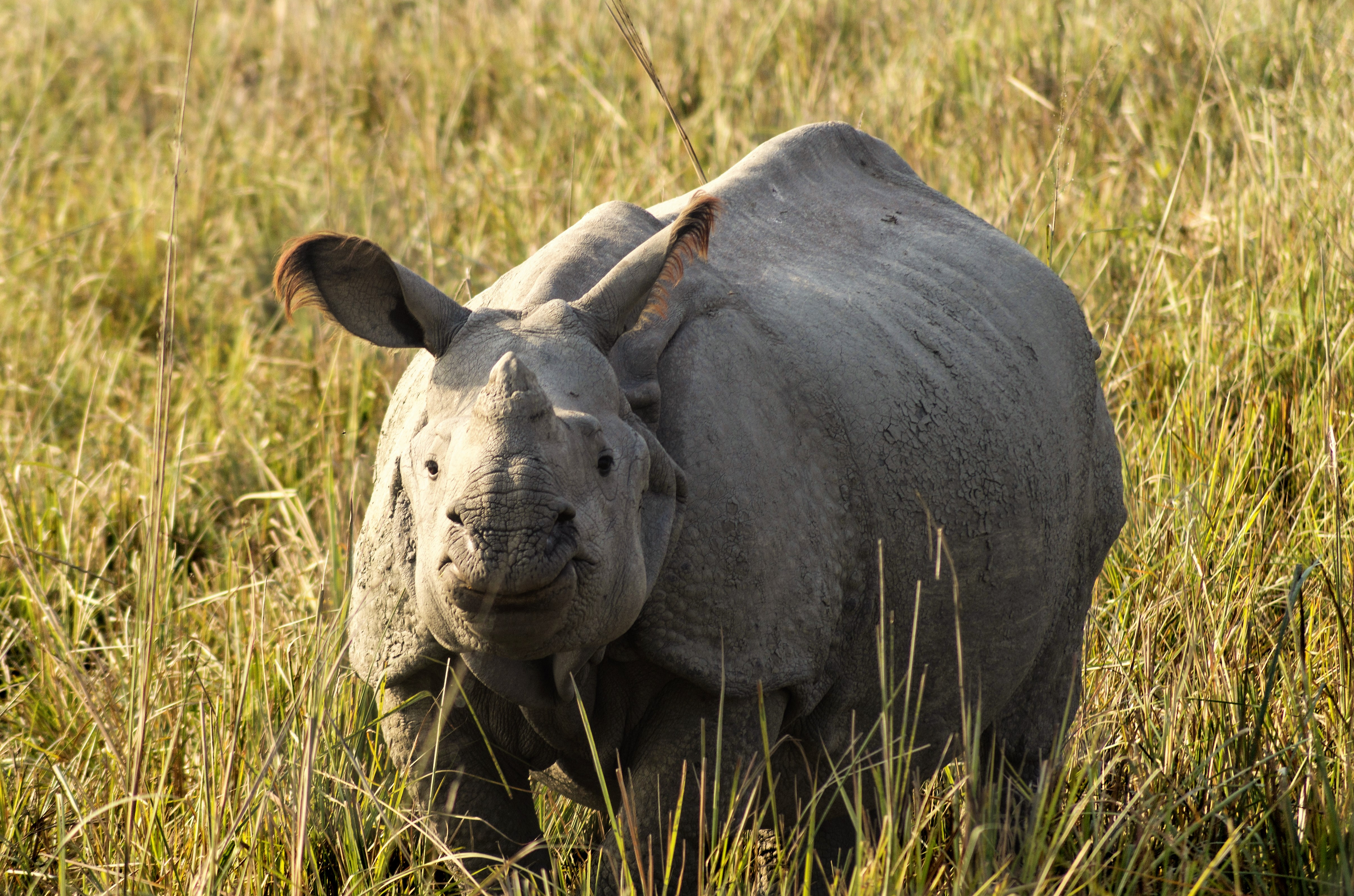
Indian one-horned rhino in Pabitora Wildlife Sanctuary

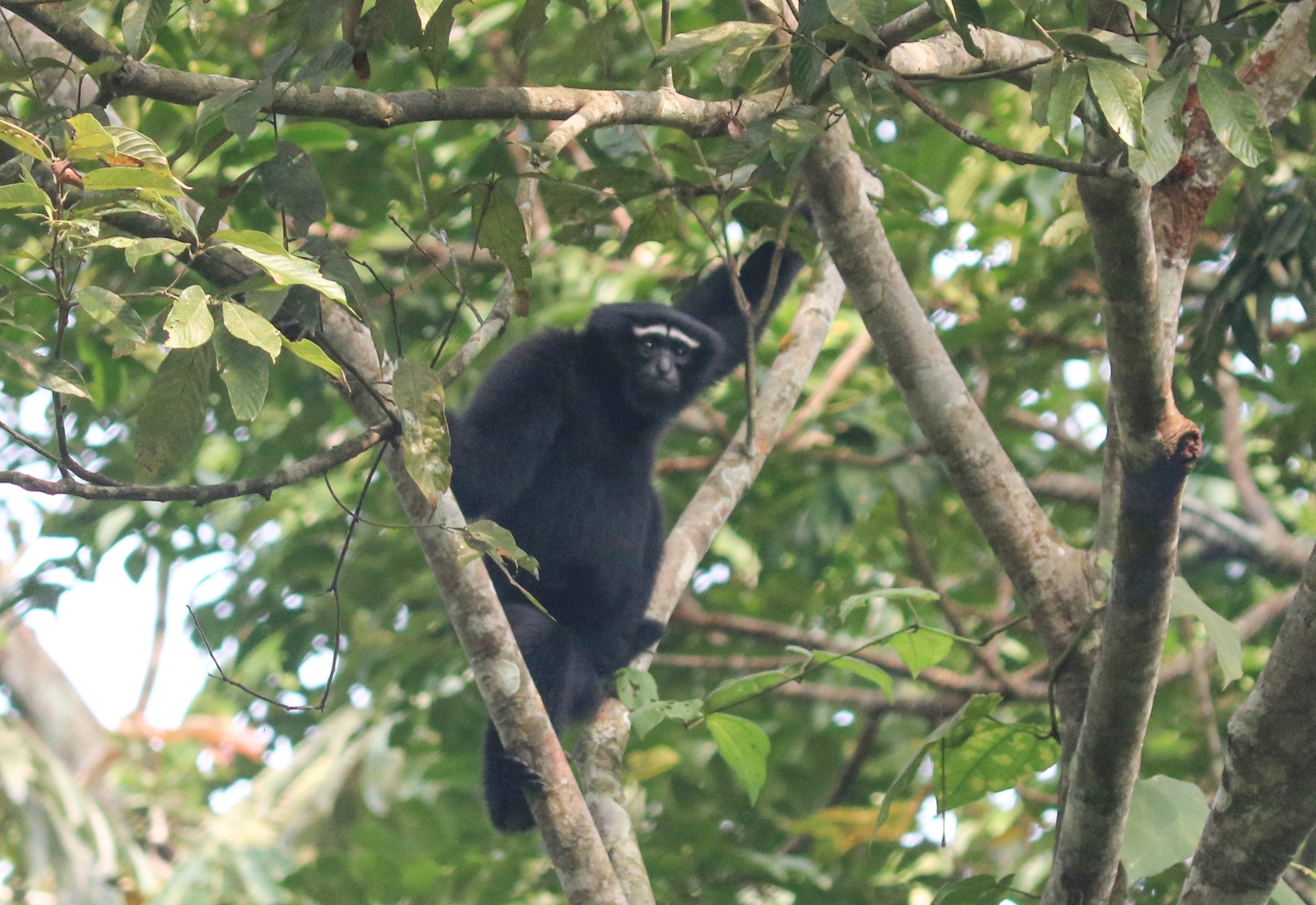
Western Hoolock Gibbon in Hoollongapar Gibbon Sanctuary

Wildlife Sanctuaries in Assam
Sanctuary	Declared	Area (km^{2})	District
Amchang Wildlife Sanctuary	2004	78.64	Kamrup
Barnadi Wildlife Sanctuary	1980	26.22	Darrang
Bherjan-Borajan-Padumoni Wildlife Sanctuary	1999	7.22	Tinsukia
Borail Wildlife Sanctuary	2004	326.24	Cachar
Burachapori Wildlife Sanctuary	1995	44.06	Sonitpur
Chakrashila Wildlife Sanctuary	1994	45.56	Dhubri
Deepar Beel Wildlife Sanctuary	1989	4.41	Kamrup
East Karbi-Anglong Wildlife Sanctuary	2000	221.81	Karbi-Anglong
Garampani Wildlife Sanctuary	1952	6.05	Karbi-Anglong
Hoollongapar Gibbon Sanctuary	1997	20.98	Jorhat
Laokhowa Wildlife Sanctuary	1972	70.13	Nagaon
Marat Longri Wildlife Sanctuary	2003	451	Karbi-Anglong
Nambor Wildlife Sanctuary	2000	37	Karbi-Anglong
Nambor - Doigrung Wildlife Sanctuary	2003	97.15	Karbi-Anglong
Pabitora Wildlife Sanctuary	1987	38.81	Marigaon
Pani Dihing Wildlife Sanctuary	1995	33.93	Sibsagar
Sonai Rupai Wildlife Sanctuary	1998	220	Sonitpur

== Bihar ==
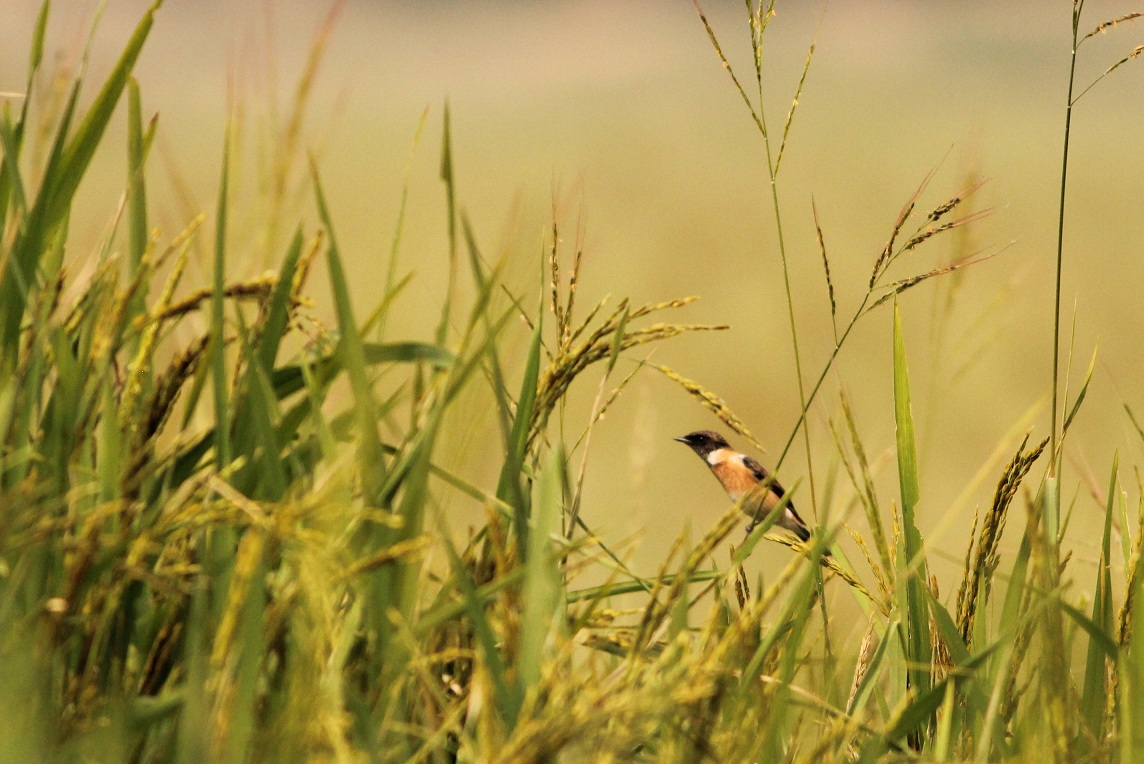
Siberian stonechat in Kanwarjheel

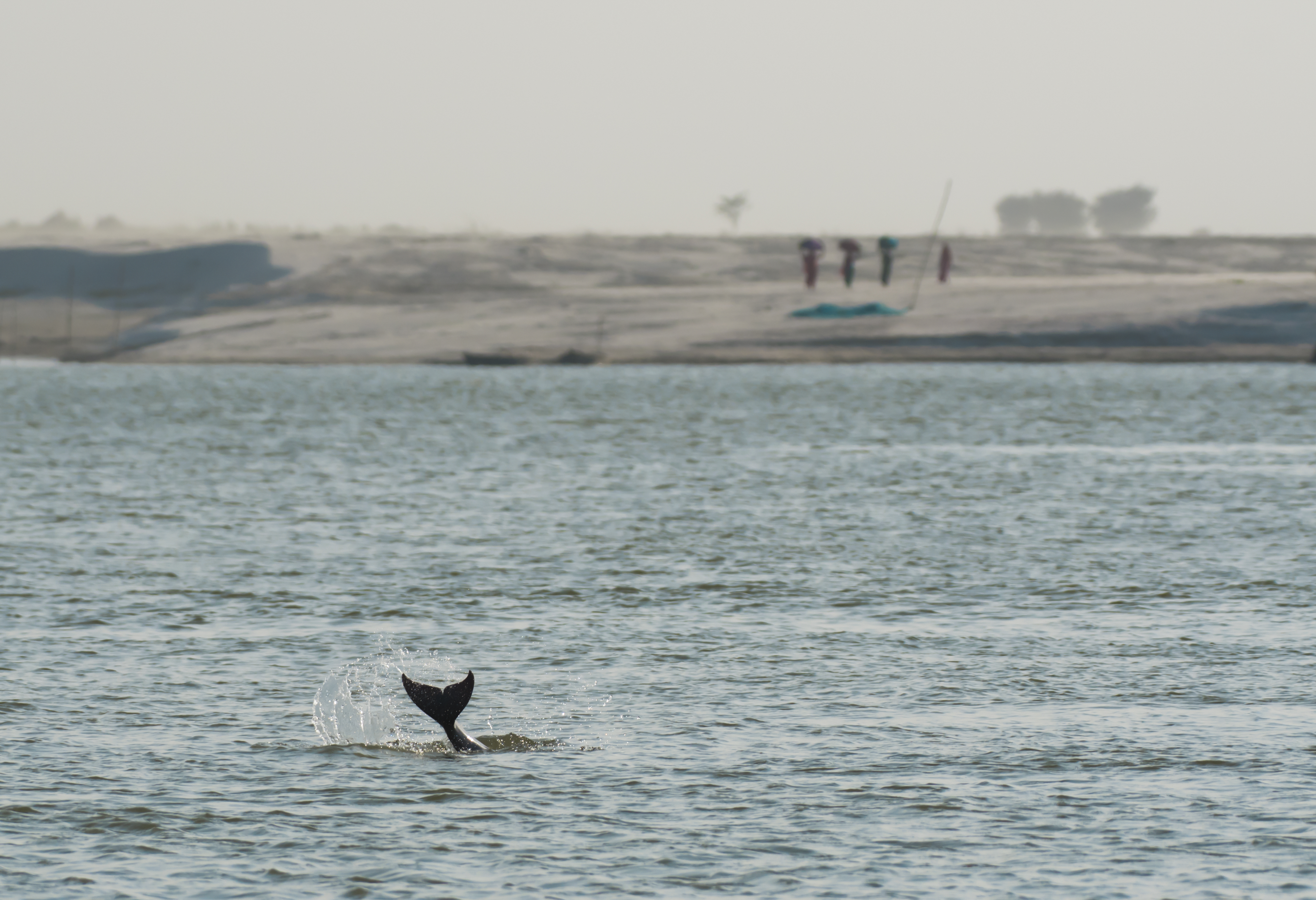
Gangetic dolphin in Vikramshila

Wildlife Sanctuaries in Bihar
Sanctuary	Declared	Area (km^{2})	District
Barela Bird Sanctuary	1997	1.979	Vaishali
Bhimbandh Wildlife Sanctuary	1976	681.9	Munger
Gautam Budha Wildlife Sanctuary	1976	138.33	Gaya
Kaimur Wildlife Sanctuary	1979	1504.96	Rohtas
Kanwarjheel Wildlife Sanctuary	1989	63.11	Begusarai
Kusheshwar Asthan Bird Wildlife Sanctuary	1994	29.21	Darbhanga
Nagi Dam Wildlife Sanctuary	1987	1.92	Jamui
Nakti Dam Wildlife Sanctuary	1987	3.33	Jamui
Pant Wildlife Sanctuary	1978	35.84	Nalanda
Rajauli Wildlife Sanctuary	2019	27.27	Nawada
Udaypur Wildlife Sanctuary	1978	8.87	Pashchim Champaran
Valmiki Wildlife Sanctuary	1978	880.78	Pashchim Champaran
Vikramshila Gangetic Dolphin Sanctuary	1990	60	Bhagalpur

== Chandigarh ==
Wildlife Sanctuaries in Chandigarh
Sanctuary	Declared	Area (km^{2})	District
Parrot Bird Sanctuary	1998	0.03	Chandigarh
Sukhna Wildlife Sanctuary	1986	25.98	Chandigarh

== Chhattisgarh ==
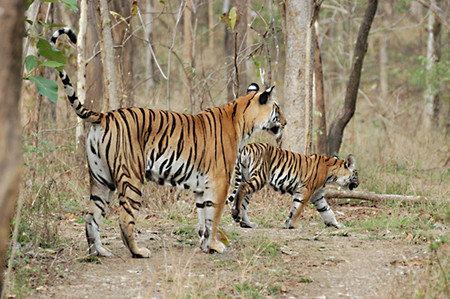
Bengal tigers in Achanakmar Wildlife Sanctuary

Wildlife Sanctuaries in Chhattisgarh
Sanctuary	Declared	Area (km^{2})	District
Achanakmar Wildlife Sanctuary	1975	551.55	Bilaspur
Badalkhol Wildlife Sanctuary	1975	104.45	Jashpur
Barnawapara Wildlife Sanctuary	1976	244.66	Raipur
Bhairamgarh Wildlife Sanctuary	1983	138.95	Bijapur
Bhoramdev Wildlife Sanctuary	2001	351.24	Kawardha
Gomardha Wildlife Sanctuary	1975	277.82	Raigarh
Pamed Wildlife Sanctuary	1985	262.12	Bijapur
Semarsot Wildlife Sanctuary	1978	430.35	Surguja
Sitanadi Wildlife Sanctuary	1974	553.36	Dhamtari
Tamor Pingla Wildlife Sanctuary	1978	608.51	Surguja
Udanti Wildlife Sanctuary	1983	247.59	Gariaband

== Dadra Nagar Haveli and Daman and Diu ==
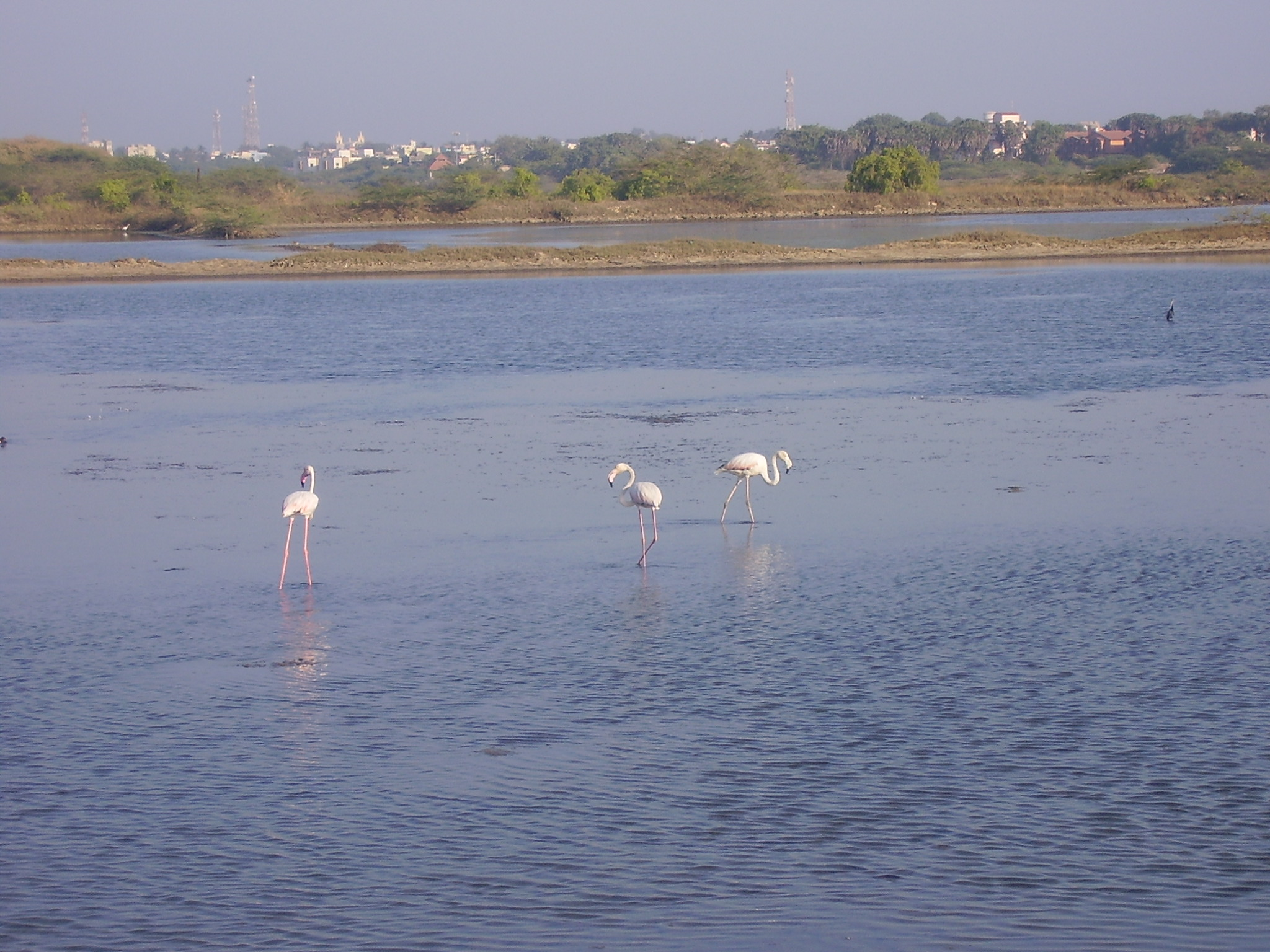
Greater flamingos in Fudam Bird Sanctuary

Wildlife Sanctuaries in Dadra and Nagar Haveli and Daman and Diu
Sanctuary	Declared	Area (km^{2})	District
Dadra and Nagar Haveli Wildlife Sanctuary	2000	92.16	Dadra and Nagar Haveli
Fudam Bird Sanctuary	1991	2.18	Diu

== Delhi ==
Wildlife Sanctuaries in Delhi
Sanctuary	Declared	Area (km^{2})	District
Asola Bhatti Wildlife Sanctuary	1992	27.82	South Delhi

== Goa ==
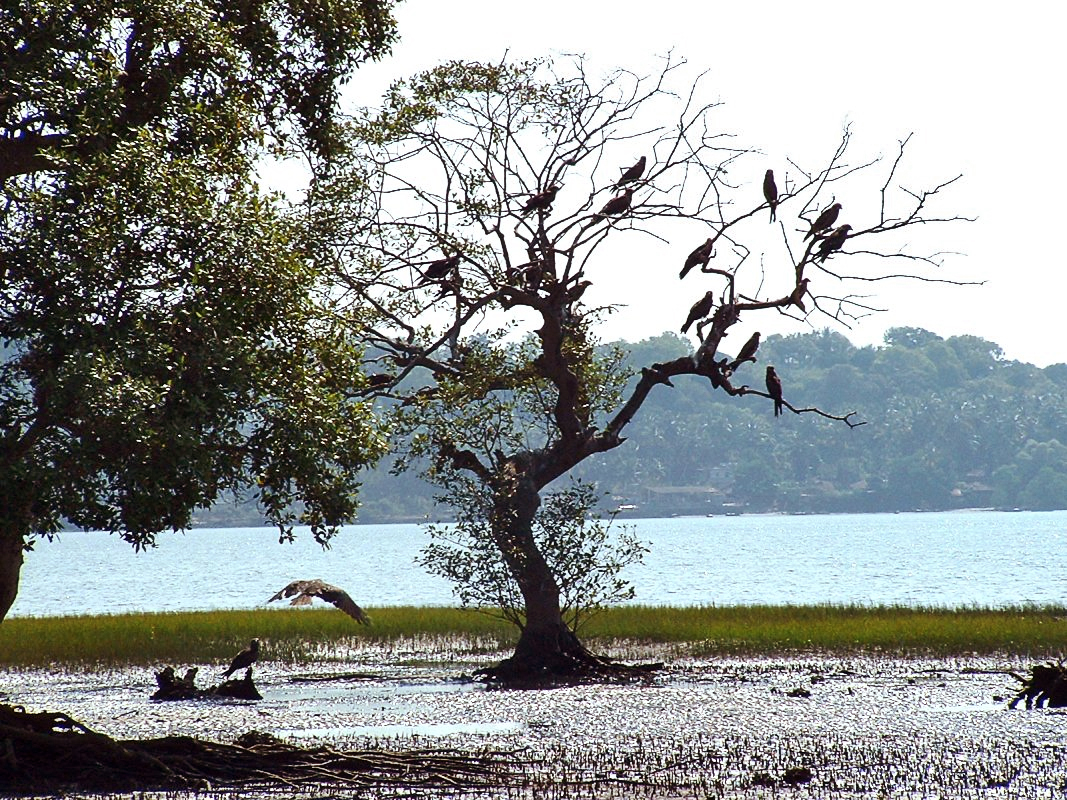
Birds in Salim Ali Bird Sanctuary

Wildlife Sanctuaries in Goa
Sanctuary	Declared	Area (km^{2})	District
Bhagwan Mahavir Sanctuary	1967	133	North Goa
Bondla Wildlife Sanctuary	1969	8	North Goa
Cotigao Wildlife Sanctuary	1968	85.65	South Goa
Madei Wildlife Sanctuary	1999	208.48	North Goa
Netravali Wildlife Sanctuary	1999	211.05	South Goa
Salim Ali Bird Sanctuary	1988	1.78	North Goa

== Gujarat ==
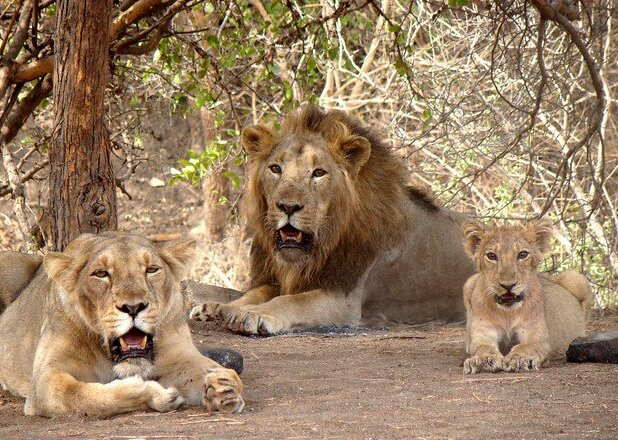
Endangered Asiatic lions are only found in Gir Wildlife Sanctuary

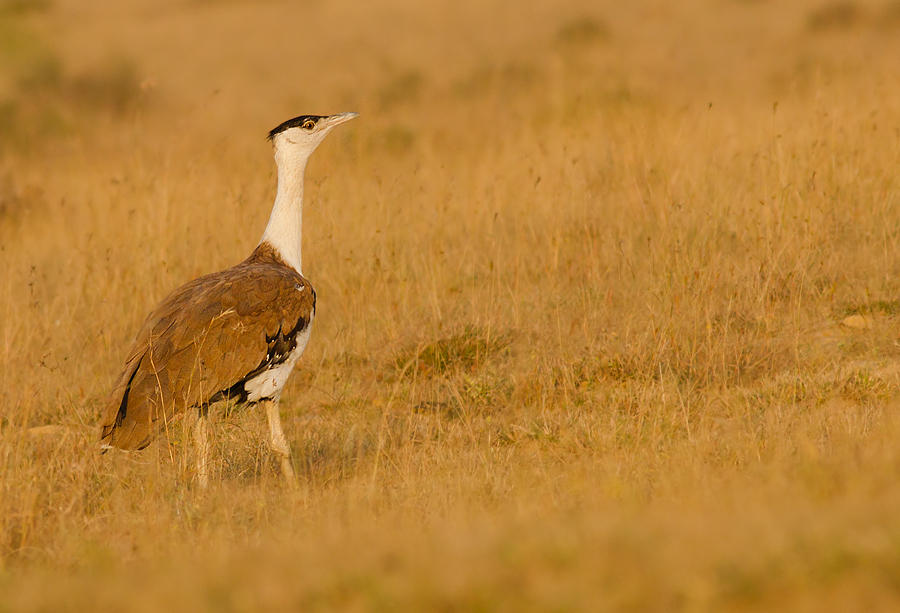
Critically endangered Indian bustard in Kutch Bustard Sanctuary

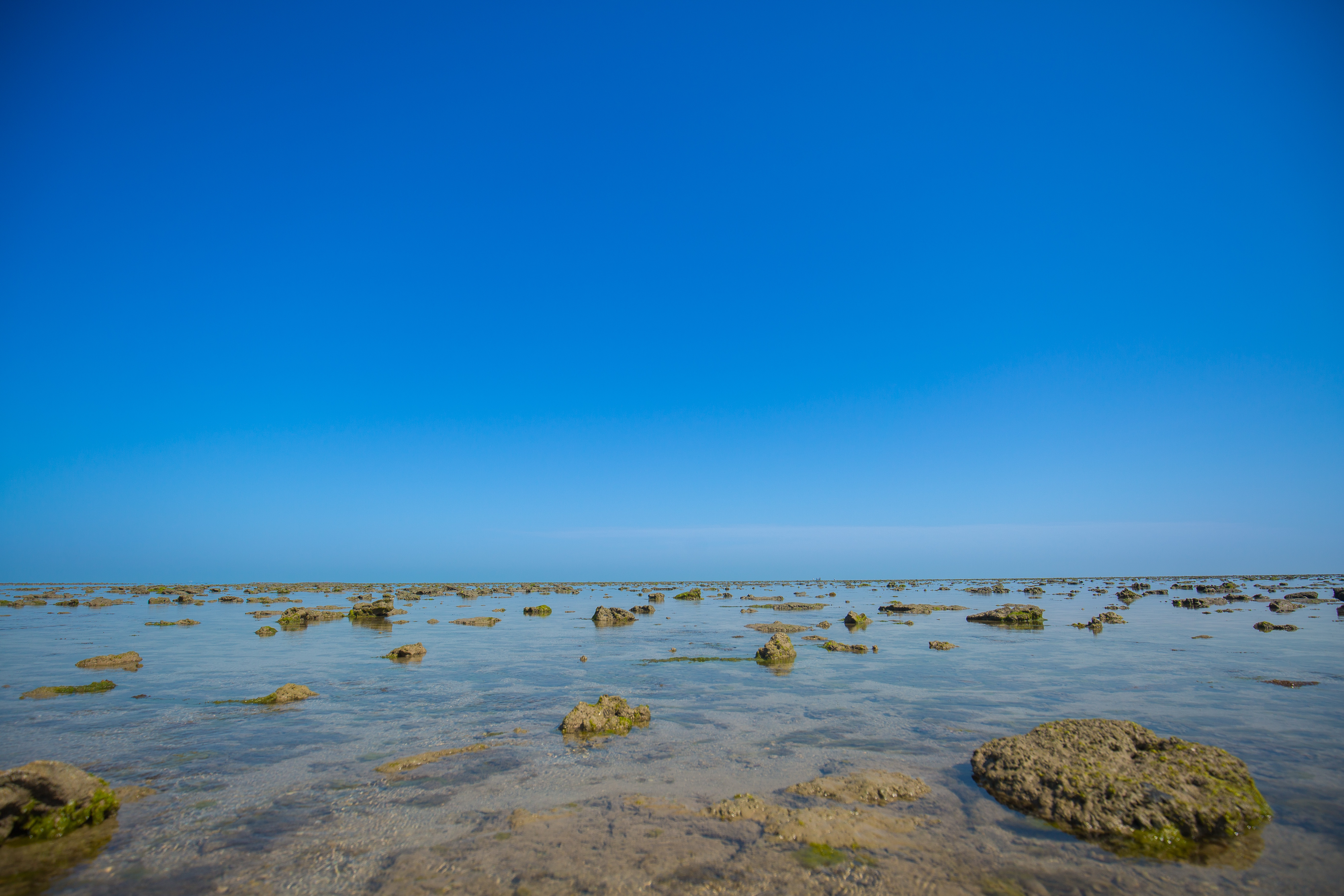
Marine Sanctuary in Gulf of Kutch

Wildlife Sanctuaries in Gujarat
Sanctuary	Declared	Area (km^{2})	District
Balaram Ambaji Wildlife Sanctuary	1989	542.08	Banaskantha
Barda Wildlife Sanctuary	1979	192.31	Jamnagar, Porbandar
Gaga Wildlife Sanctuary	1988	3.33	Jamnagar
Gir Wildlife Sanctuary	1965	1153.42	Amreli, Junagadh
Girnar Wildlife Sanctuary	2008	178.8	Junagadh
Hingolgadh Wildlife Sanctuary	1980	6.54	Rajkot
Jambughoda Wildlife Sanctuary	1990	130.38	Godhra
Jessore Sloth Bear Sanctuary	1978	180.66	Banaskantha
Khijadiya Bird Sanctuary	1981	6.05	Jamnagar
Kutch Bustard Sanctuary	1995	2.03	Kachchh
Kutch Desert Wildlife Sanctuary	1986	7506.22	Kachchh
Marine Wildlife Sanctuary	1980	295.03	Jamnagar
Mitiyala Wildlife Sanctuary	2004	18.22	Junagadh
Nal Sarovar Bird Sanctuary	1969	120.82	Ahmedabad, Surendranagar
Narayan Sarovar Wildlife Sanctuary	1995	442.91	Kachchh
Pania Wildlife Sanctuary	1989	39.63	Amreli
Porbandar Bird Sanctuary	1988	0.09	Porbandar
Purna Wildlife Sanctuary	1990	160.84	Dangs
Rampara Wildlife Sanctuary	1988	15.01	Rajkot
Ratanmahal Wildlife Sanctuary	1982	55.65	Dahod
Shoolpaneshwar Wildlife Sanctuary	1982	607.7	Bharuch
Thol Lake Bird Sanctuary	1988	6.99	Mahesana
Wild Ass Wildlife Sanctuary	1973	4953.71	Banaskantha, Kachchh, Mahesana, Patan, Rajkot, Surendranagar

== Haryana ==
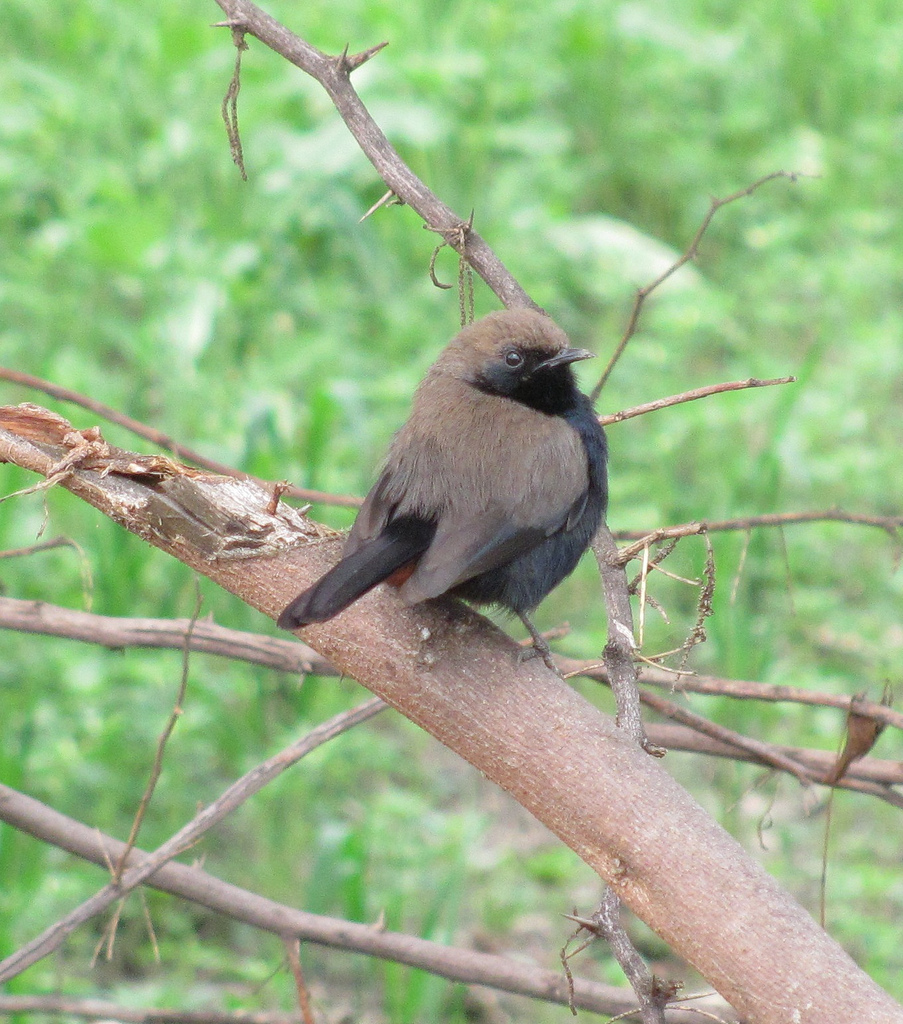
Indian robin in Bhindawas Sanctuary

Wildlife Sanctuaries in Haryana
Sanctuary	Declared	Area (km^{2})	District
Abubshahar Wildlife Sanctuary	1987	115.31	Sirsa
Bhindawas Wildlife Sanctuary	1986	4.12	Jhajjar
Bir Shikargah Wildlife Sanctuary	1987	7.67	Panchkula
Chhilchhila Wildlife Sanctuary	1986	0.29	Kaithal
Kalesar Wildlife Sanctuary	1996	54.36	Yamuna Nagar
Khaparwas Wildlife Sanctuary	1991	0.83	Jhajjar
Khol Hi-Raitan Wildlife Sanctuary	2004	48.83	Panchkula
Nahar Wildlife Sanctuary	1987	2.11	Rewari

== Himachal Pradesh ==
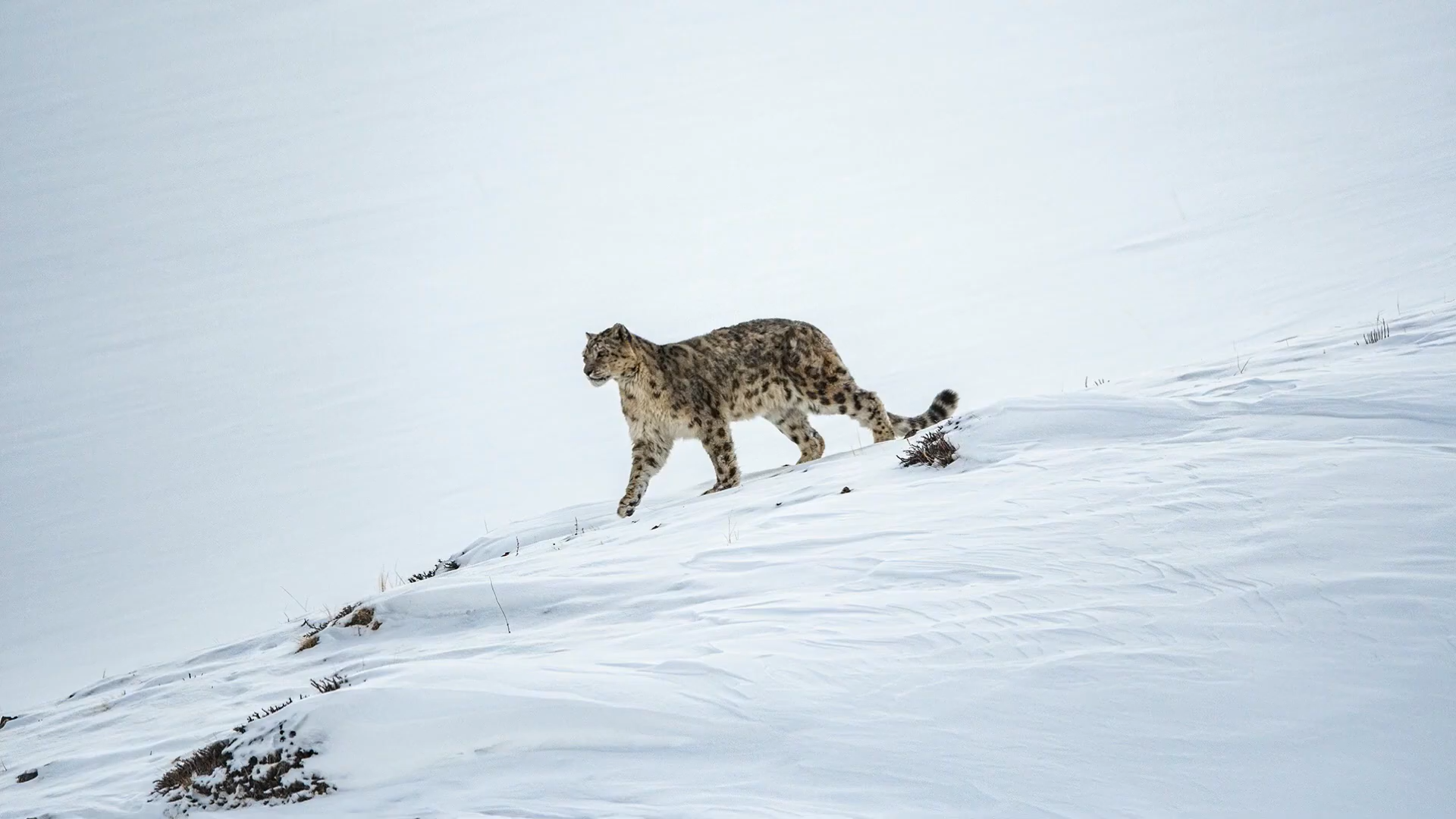
Snow leopard in Kibber

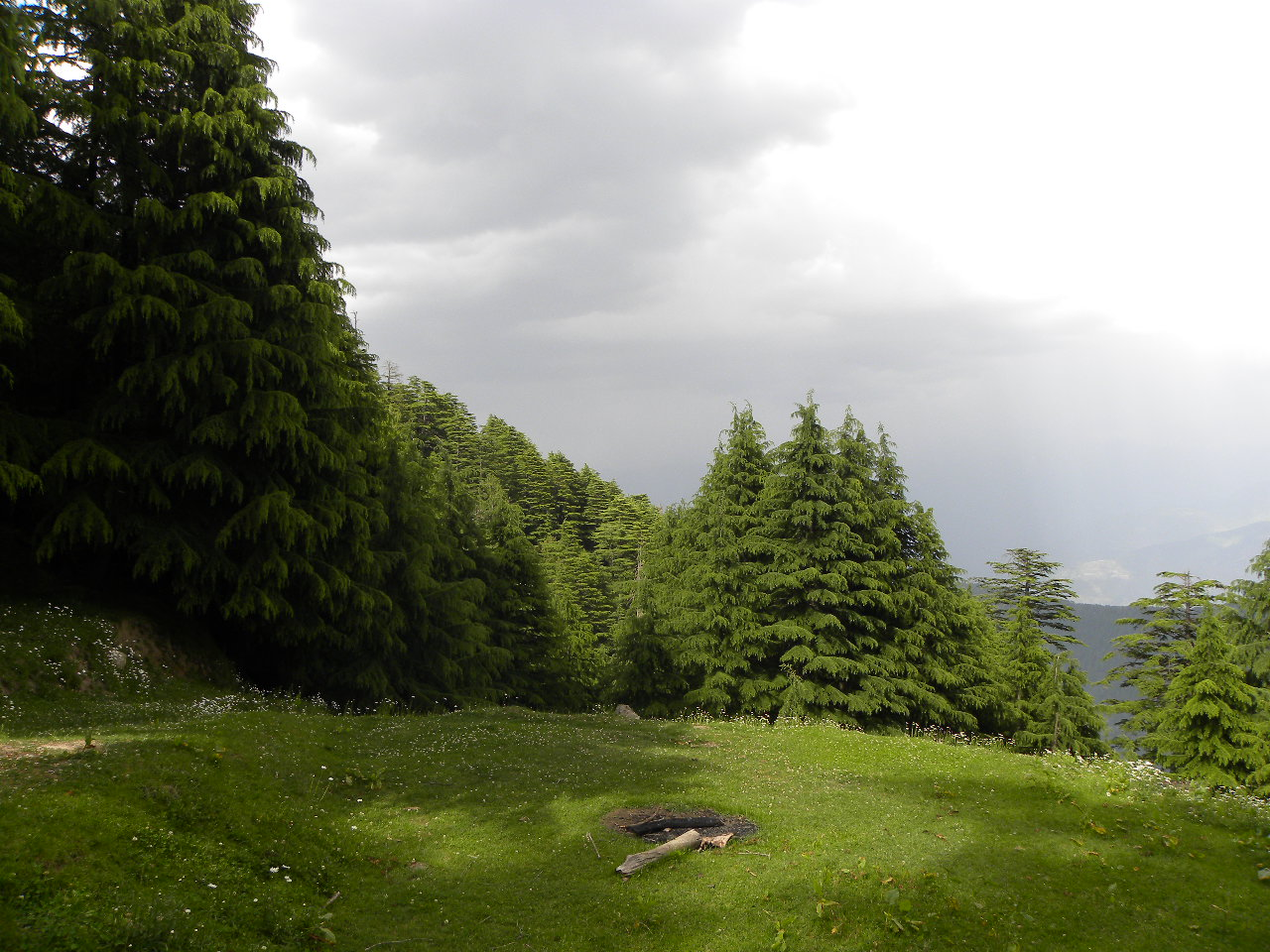
Kalatop Wildlife Sanctuary

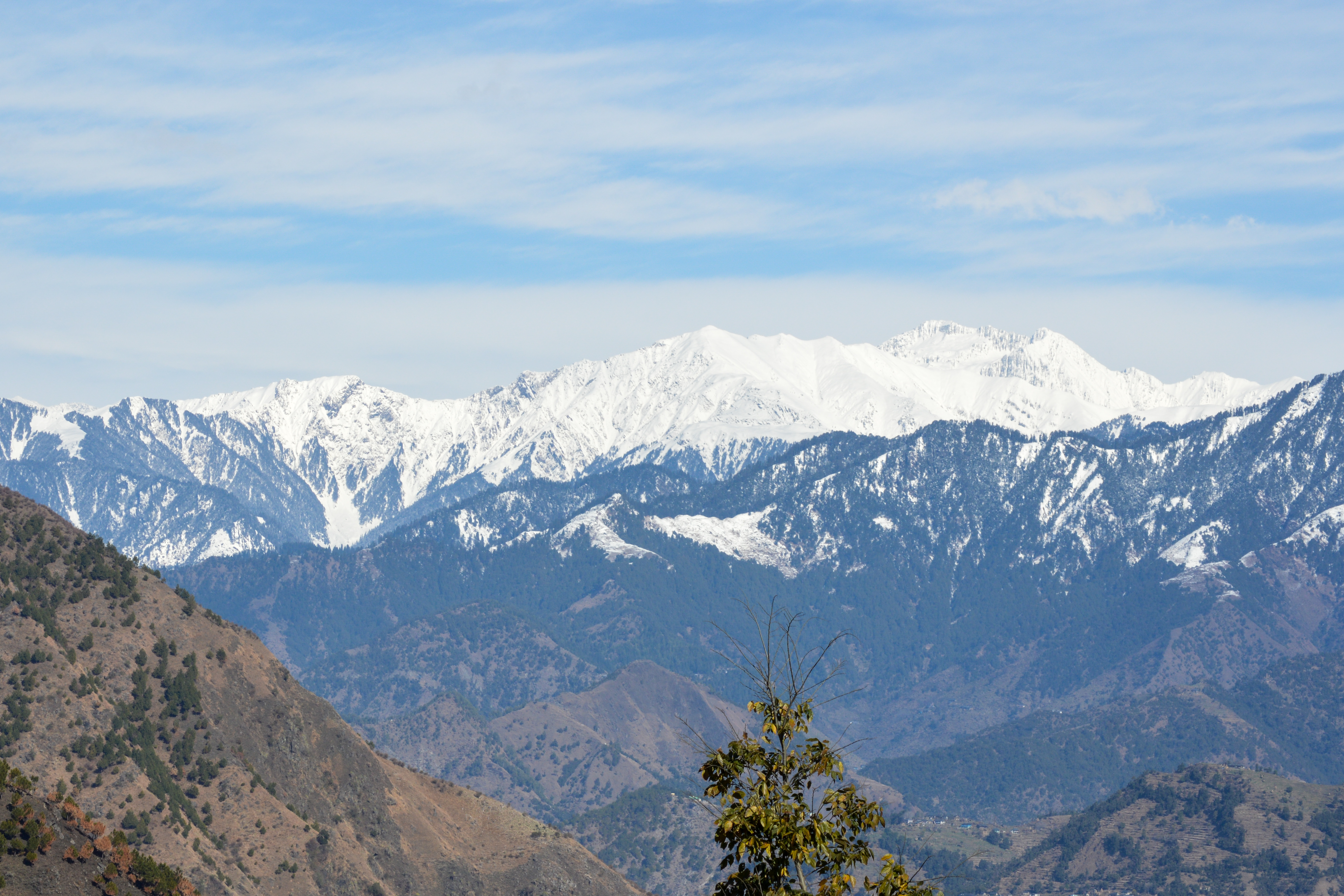
Snowy peaks in Nargu Wildlife Sanctuary

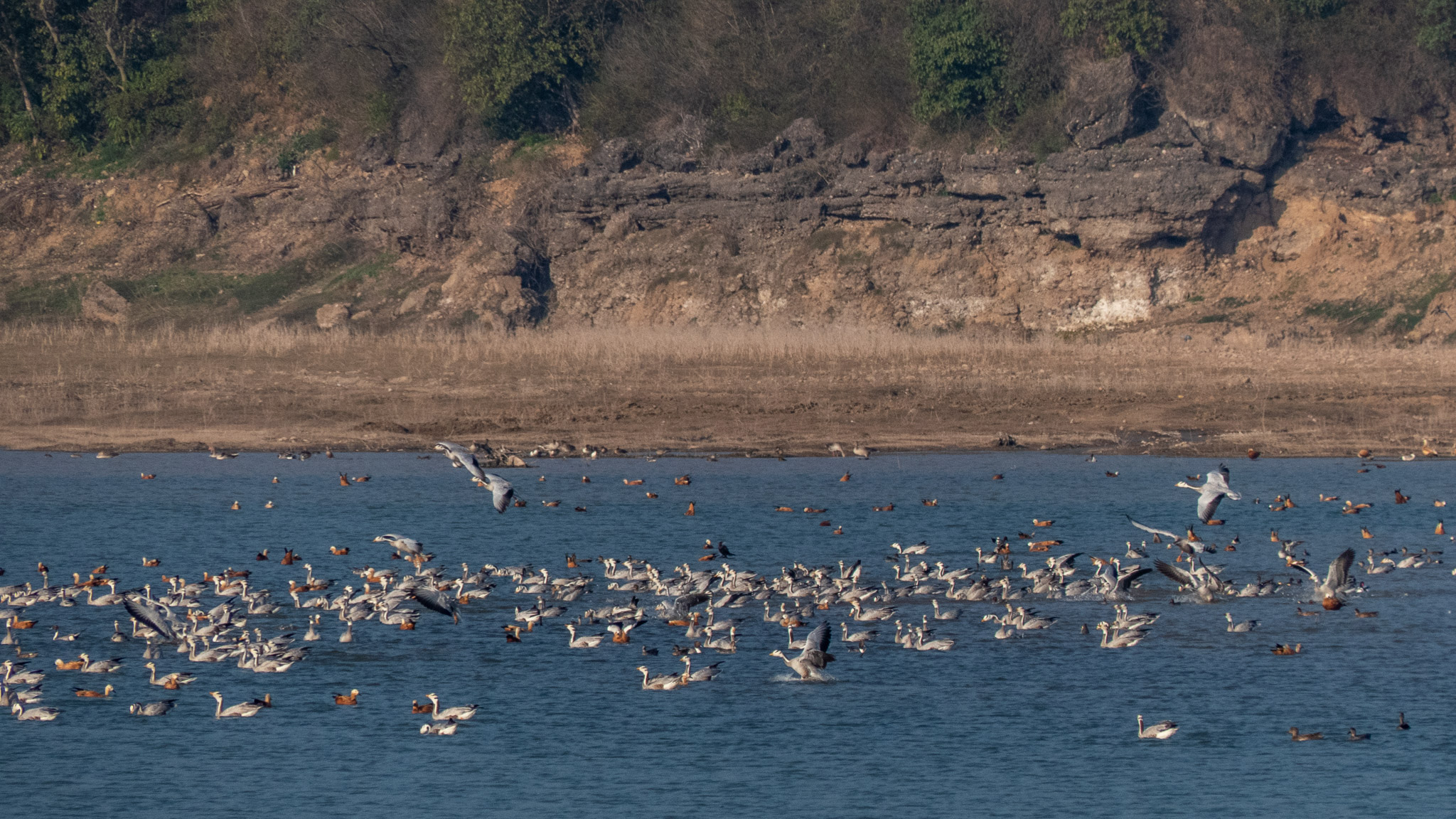
Birds in Pong Dam Lake

Wildlife Sanctuaries in Himachal Pradesh
Sanctuary	Declared	Area (km^{2})	District
Bandli Wildlife Sanctuary	1962	32.11	Mandi
Chail Wildlife Sanctuary	1976	16	Sirmaur
Chandratal Wildlife Sanctuary	2007	38.56	Lahaul and Spiti
Churdhar Wildlife Sanctuary	1985	55.52	Sirmaur
Daranghati Wildlife Sanctuary	1962	171.5	Shimla
Dhauladhar Wildlife Sanctuary	1994	982.96	Kangra
Gamgul Siahbehi Wildlife Sanctuary	1962	108.4	Chamba
Kais Wildlife Sanctuary	1954	12.61	Kullu
Kalatop Khajjiar Wildlife Sanctuary	1958	17.17	Chamba
Kanwar Wildlife Sanctuary	1954	107.29	Kullu
Khokhan Wildlife Sanctuary	1954	14.94	Kullu
Kibber Wildlife Sanctuary	1992	2220.12	Lahul and Spiti
Kugti Wildlife Sanctuary	1962	405.49	Chamba
Lippa Asrang Wildlife Sanctuary	2001	31	Kinnaur
Majathal Wildlife Sanctuary	1954	30.86	Solan
Manali Wildlife Sanctuary	1954	29	Kullu
Nargu Wildlife Sanctuary	1962	132.37	Mandi
Pong Dam Lake Wildlife Sanctuary	1982	207.59	Kangra
Rakchham Chitkul Wildlife Sanctuary	1989	304	Kinnaur
Renuka Wildlife Sanctuary	2013	3.87	Sirmaur
Rupi Bhaba Wildlife Sanctuary	1982	503	Kinnaur
Sainj Wildlife Sanctuary	1994	90	Kullu
Sechu Tuan Nala Wildlife Sanctuary	1962	390.29	Chamba
Shikari Devi Wildlife Sanctuary	1962	29.94	Mandi
Shimla Wildlife Sanctuary	1958	10	Shimla
Talra Wildlife Sanctuary	1962	46.48	Shimla
Tirthan Wildlife Sanctuary	1992	61	Kullu
Tundah Wildlife Sanctuary	1999	64	Chamba

== Jammu and Kashmir ==
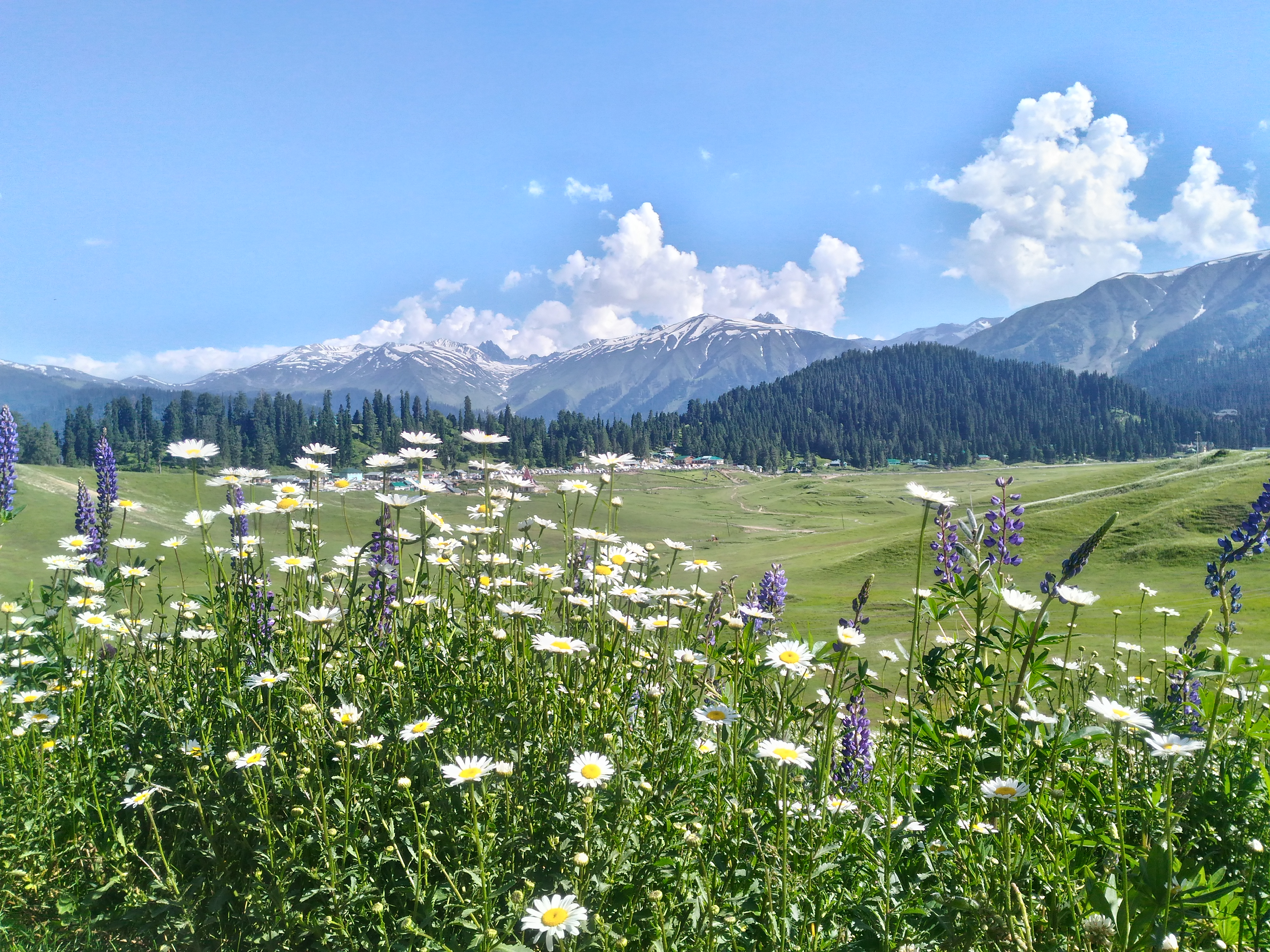
Flora in Gulmarg Wildlife Sanctuary

Wildlife Sanctuaries in Jammu and Kashmir
Sanctuary	Declared	Area (km^{2})	District
Baltal Thajwas Wildlife Sanctuary	1987	203	Srinagar
Gulmarg Wildlife Sanctuary	1987	180	Baramulla
Hirpora Wildlife Sanctuary	1987	341.25	Baramulla
Jasrota Wildlife Sanctuary	1987	10.04	Kathua
Lachipora Wildlife Sanctuary	1987	80	Baramulla
Limber Wildlife Sanctuary	1987	12	Baramulla
Nandini Wildlife Sanctuary	1990	33.34	Jammu
Overa-Aru Wildlife Sanctuary	1987	425	Anantnag
Rajparian Wildlife Sanctuary	1945	20	Anantnag
Ramnagar Rakha Wildlife Sanctuary	1990	31.5	Jammu
Surinsar-Mansar Wildlife Sanctuary	1990	97.82	Jammu
Tata Kutti Wildlife Sanctuary	2012	66.27	Jammu
Tral Wildlife Sanctuary	2019	154.15	Pulwama

== Jharkhand ==
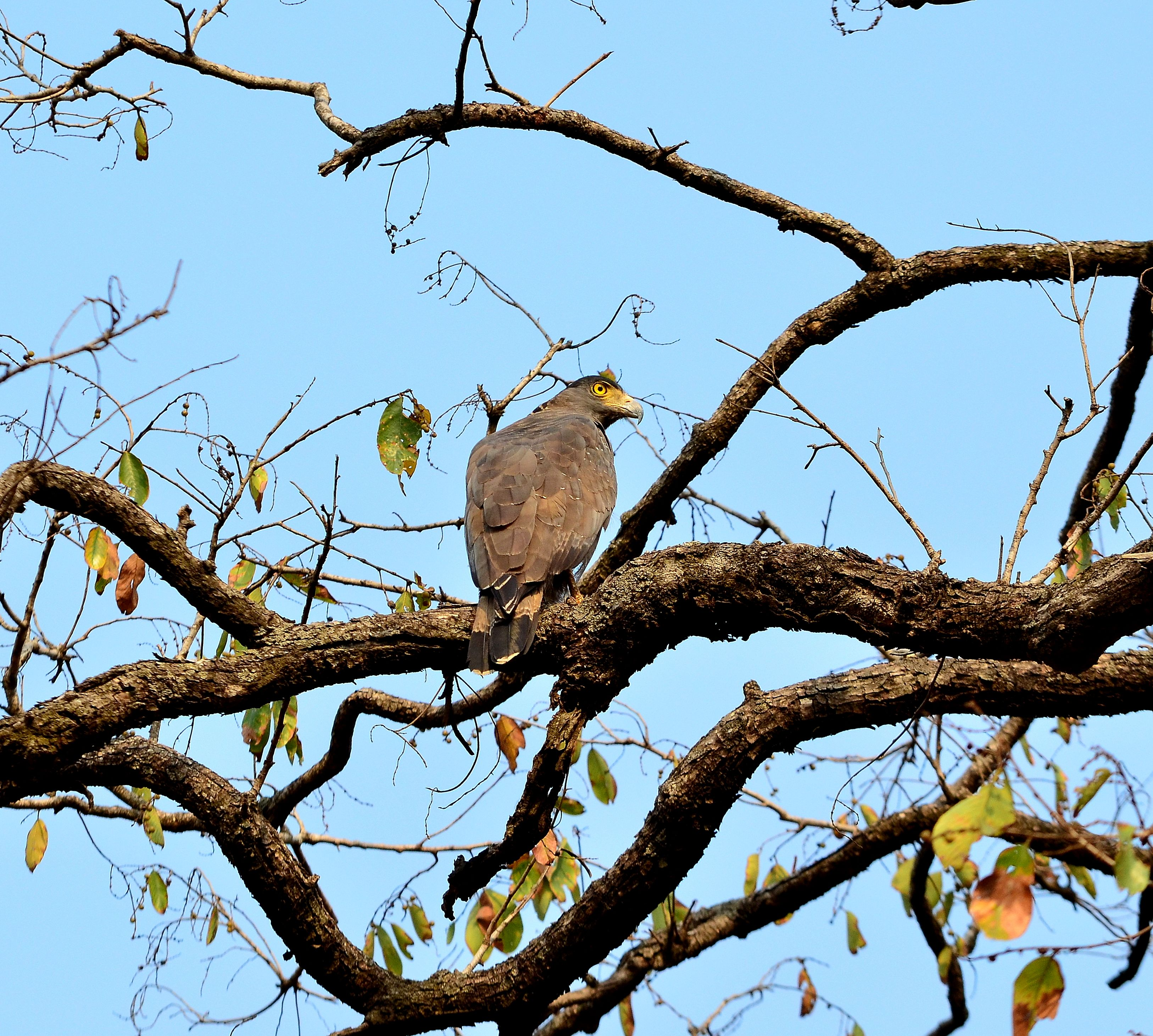
Crested serpent eagle in Dalma Wildlife Sanctuary

Wildlife Sanctuaries in Jharkhand
Sanctuary	Declared	Area (km^{2})	District
Dalma Wildlife Sanctuary	1976	193.22	Singhbhum East
Gautam Budha Wildlife Sanctuary	1976	121.14	Koderma
Hazaribagh Wildlife Sanctuary	1976	186.25	Hazaribagh
Koderma Wildlife Sanctuary	1985	177.35	Koderma
Lawalong Wildlife Sanctuary	1978	211.03	Chatra
Mahuadanr Wildlife Sanctuary	1976	63.26	Palamau
Palamau Wildlife Sanctuary	1976	752.94	Palamau
Palkot Wildlife Sanctuary	1990	182.83	Gumla
Parasnath Wildlife Sanctuary	1984	49.33	Giridih
Topchanchi Wildlife Sanctuary	1978	12.82	Dhanbad
Udhwa Lake Wildlife Sanctuary	1991	5.65	Sahebganj

== Karnataka ==
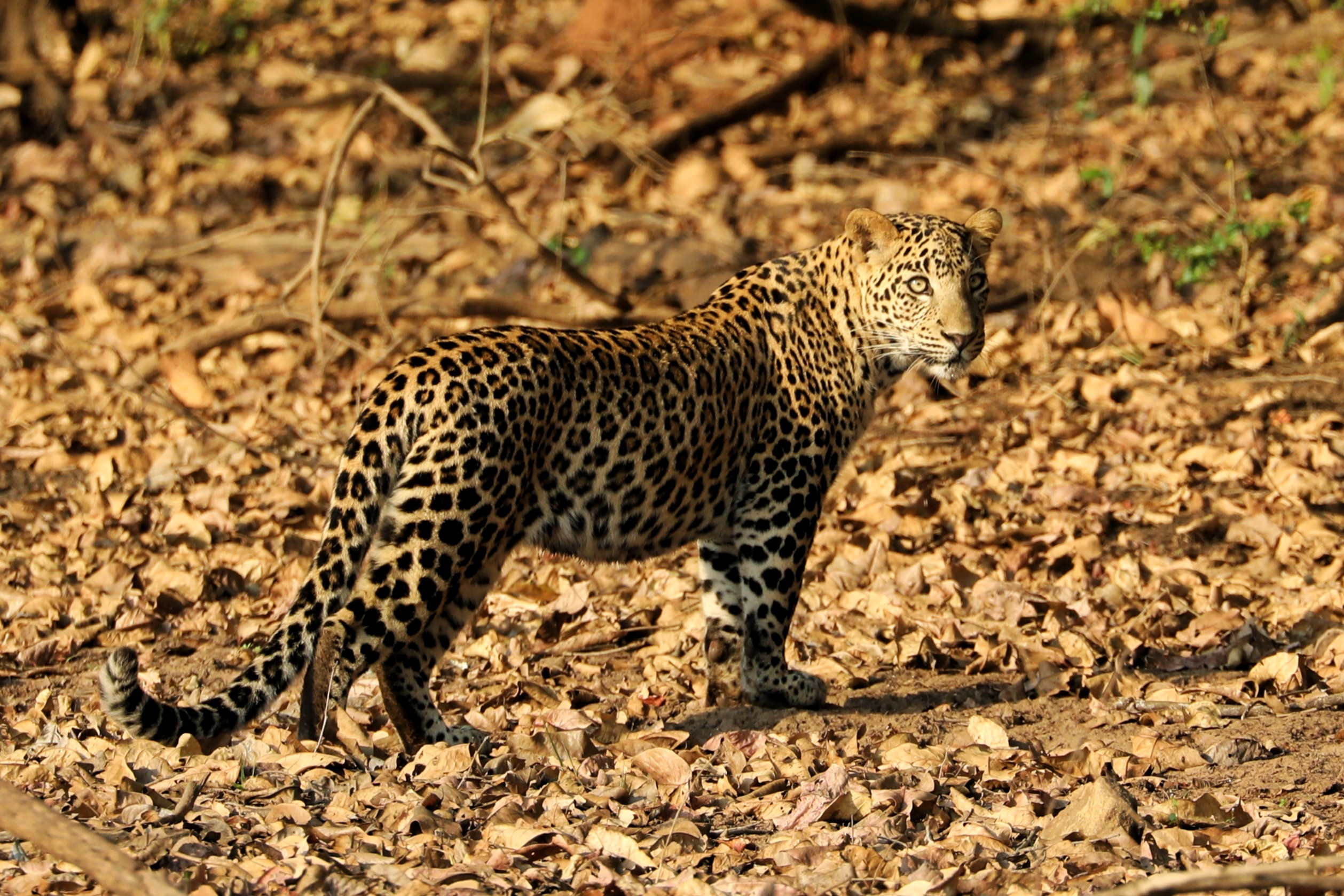
Indian leopard in Bhadra Wildlife Sanctuary

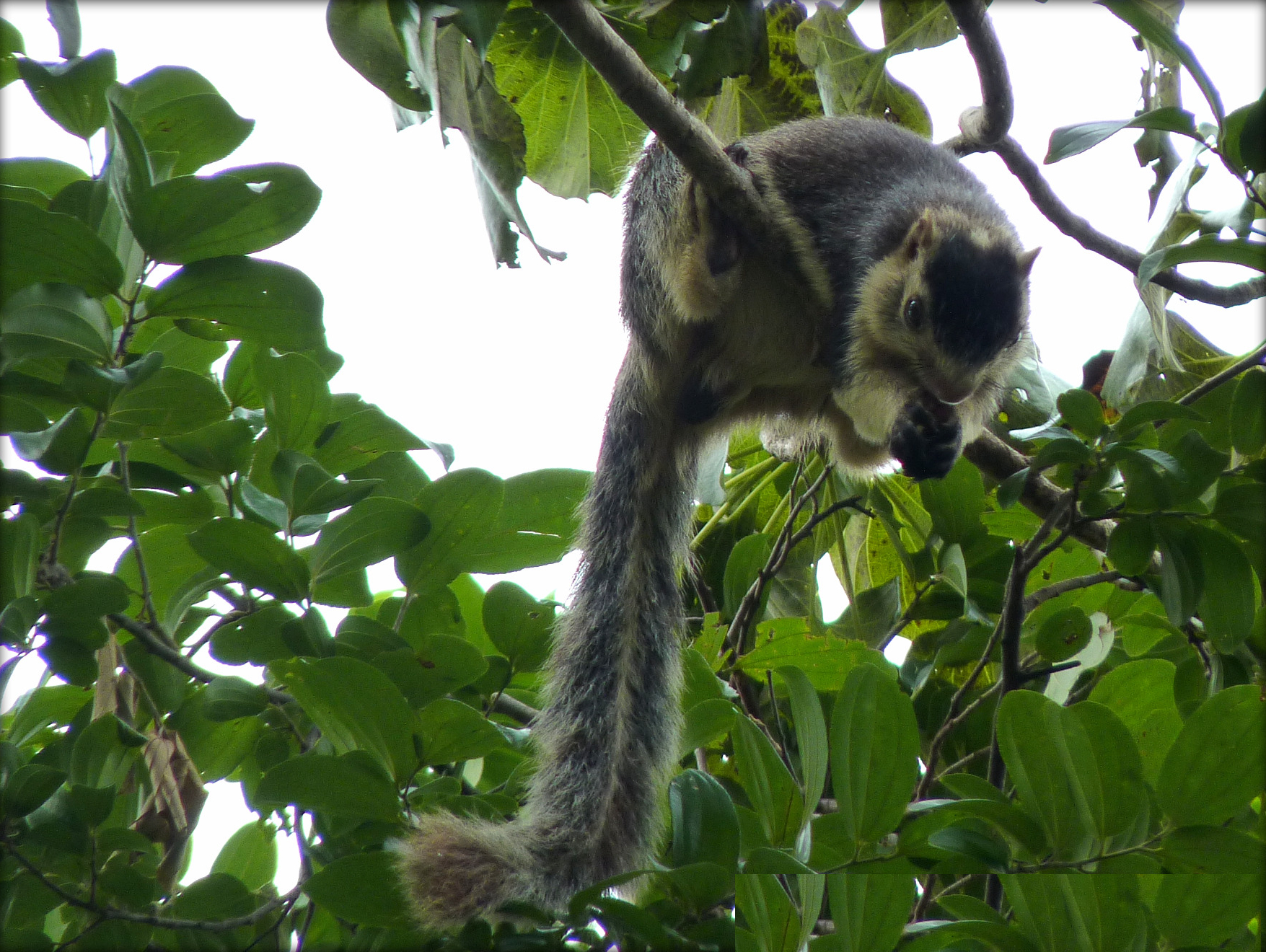
Grizzled giant squirrel in Cauvery Wildlife Sanctuary

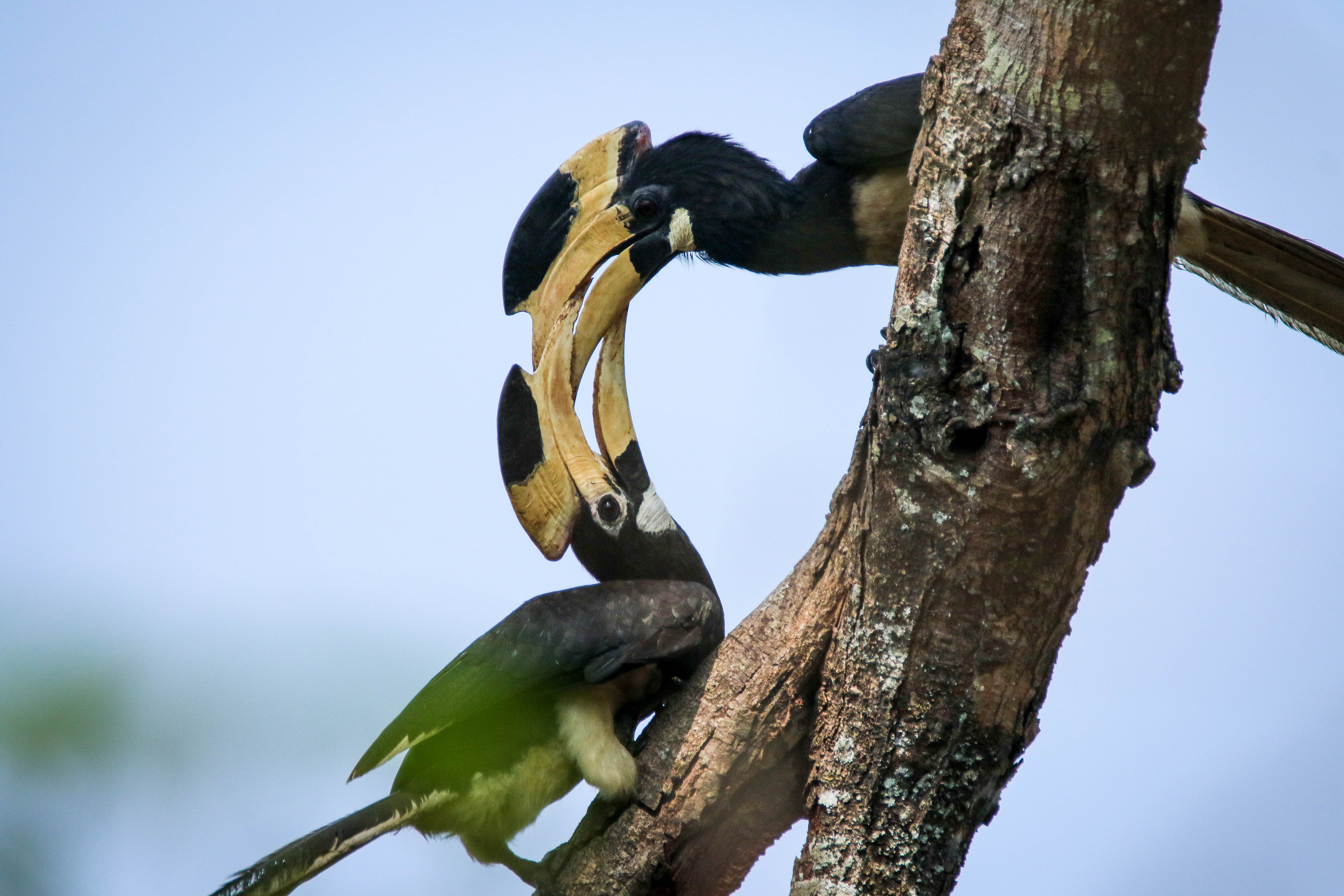
Malabar pied hornbills in Dandeli Wildlife Sanctuary

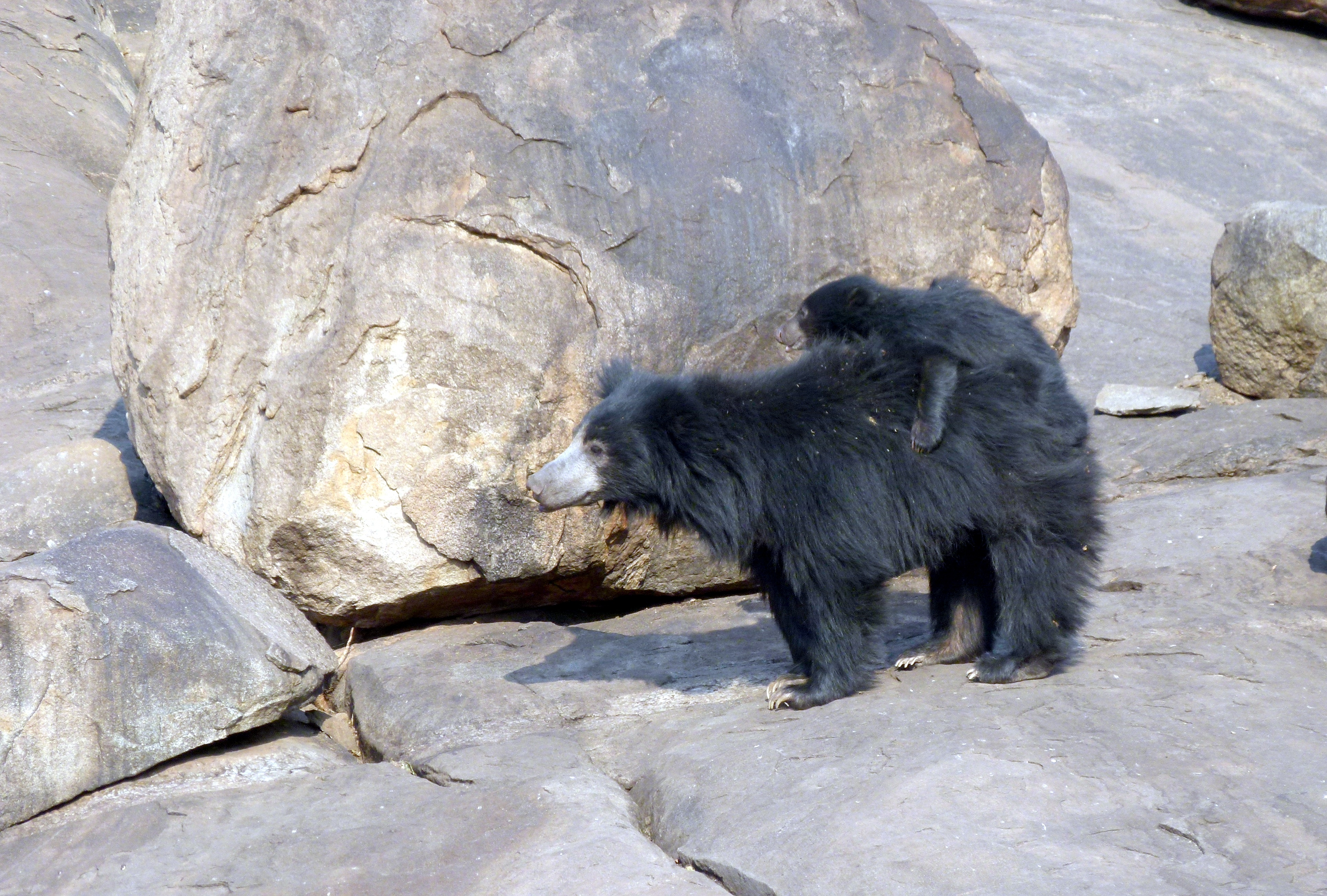
Sloth bear with cub at Daroji Sloth Bear Sanctuary

Wildlife Sanctuaries in Karnataka
Sanctuary	Declared	Area (km^{2})	District
Adichunchunagiri Wildlife Sanctuary	1981	0.84	Mandya
Arabithittu Wildlife Sanctuary	1985	13.5	Mysore
Arsikere Sloth Bear Wildlife Sanctuary	2023	100.88	Hassan
Attiveri Bird Sanctuary	1994	2.23	Uttara Kannada
Bankapura Wolf Wildlife Sanctuary	2023	3.32	Koppal
Bhadra Wildlife Sanctuary	1974	500.16	Chikmagalur, Shimoga
Bhimgad Wildlife Sanctuary	2010	190.42	Belgavi
Biligiri Rangaswamy Temple Wildlife Sanctuary	1987	539.52	Chamarajanagar
Brahmagiri Wildlife Sanctuary	1974	181.29	Kodagu
Bukkapatna Chinkara Wildlife Sanctuary	2019	148	Tumakuru
Cauvery Extension Wildlife Sanctuary			
Cauvery Wildlife Sanctuary	1987	1027.53	Chamarajanagar, Mandya, Ramanagar
Chincholi Wildlife Sanctuary	2011	134.88	Kalaburagi
Dandeli Wildlife Sanctuary	1987	886.41	Uttara Kannada
Daroji Sloth Bear Sanctuary	1992	82.72	Dharwar
Ghataprabha Wildlife Sanctuary	1974	29.78	Belgaum
Gudavi Bird Sanctuary	1989	0.73	Shimoga
Gudekote Extension Wildlife Sanctuary	2019	120.04	Ballari
Gudekote Wildlife Sanctuary	2013	47.16	Ballari
Jogimatti Wildlife Sanctuary	2015	100.48	Chitradurga
Kamasandra Wildlife Sanctuary	2019	78.62	Ramanagara
Kappathagudda Wildlife Sanctuary	2019	244.15	Gadag
Malai Mahadeshwara Wildlife Sanctuary	2013	906.19	Chamarajanagar
Melkote Temple Wildlife Sanctuary	1974	49.82	Mandya
Mookambika Wildlife Sanctuary	1974	370.37	Udipi
Nugu Wildlife Sanctuary	1974	30.32	Mysore
Pushpagiri Wildlife Sanctuary	1987	102.92	Dakshina Kannada, Kodagu
Ramadevarabetta Vulture Sanctuary	2012	3.46	Ramanagara
Ranganathittu Bird Sanctuary	1940	0.67	Mysore
Rangayyanadurga Wildlife Sanctuary	2011	77.23	Davanagere
Ranibennur Blackbuck Sanctuary	1974	119	Dharwad
Sharavati Valley Wildlife Sanctuary	1974	930.16	Shimoga
Shettihalli Wildlife Sanctuary	1974	395.6	Shimoga
Someshwara Wildlife Sanctuary	1974	314.25	Udipi
Talakaveri Wildlife Sanctuary	1987	105.59	Kodagu
Thimlapura Wildlife Sanctuary	2016	50.86	Tumkur
Uttaregudda Wildlife Sanctuary	2023	189.26	Chitradurga
Yadahalli Chinkara Wildlife Sanctuary	2015	96.36	Bagalkot

== Kerala ==
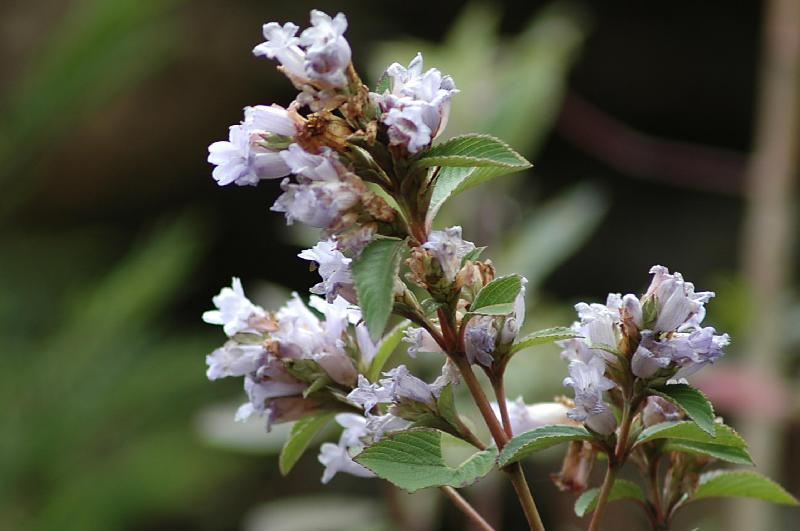
Kurinji flowers in Kurinjimala Sanctuary

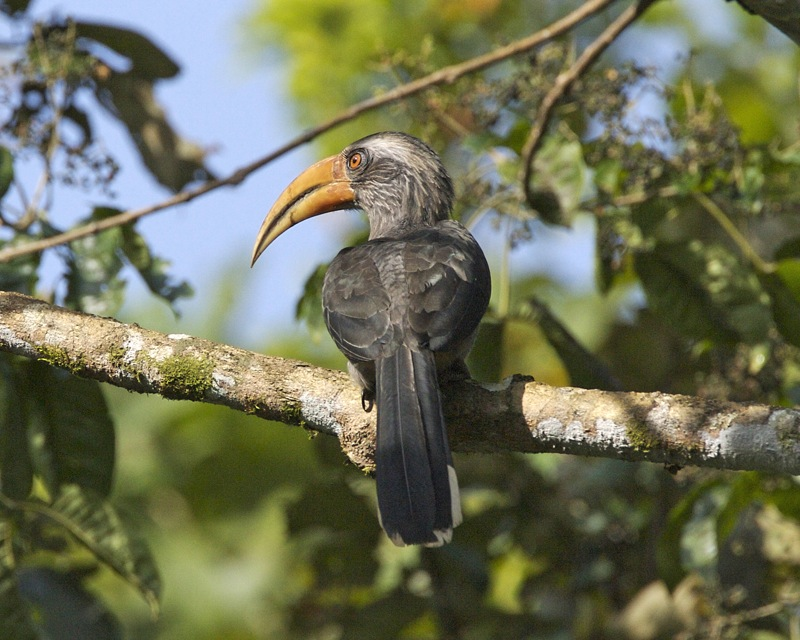
A Malabar grey hornbill in Thattekad Bird Sanctuary

Wildlife Sanctuaries in Kerala
Sanctuary	Declared	Area (km^{2})	District
Aralam Butterfly Sanctuary	1984	55	Kannur
Chimmony Wildlife Sanctuary	1984	85	Thrissur
Chinnar Wildlife Sanctuary	1984	90.44	Idukki
Choolannur Pea Fowl Sanctuary	2007	3.42	Palakkad
Idukki Wildlife Sanctuary	1976	70	Idukki
Karimpuzha Wildlife Sanctuary	2019	227.97	Malappuram
Kottiyoor Wildlife Sanctuary	2011	30.38	Kannur
Kurinjimala Sanctuary	2006	32	Idukki
Malabar Wildlife Sanctuary	2010	74.22	Kozhikode
Mangalavanam Bird Sanctuary	2004	0.03	Ernakulam
Neyyar Wildlife Sanctuary	1958	128	Thiruvananthapuram
Parambikulam Wildlife Sanctuary	1973	285	Palakkad
Peechi-Vazhani Wildlife Sanctuary	1958	125	Thrissur
Peppara Wildlife Sanctuary	1983	53	Thiruvananthapuram
Periyar Wildlife Sanctuary	1950	427	Idukki
Shendurney Wildlife Sanctuary	1984	100.32	Kollam
Thattekad Bird Sanctuary	1983	25	Idukki
Wayanad Wildlife Sanctuary	1973	344.44	Wayanad

== Ladakh ==
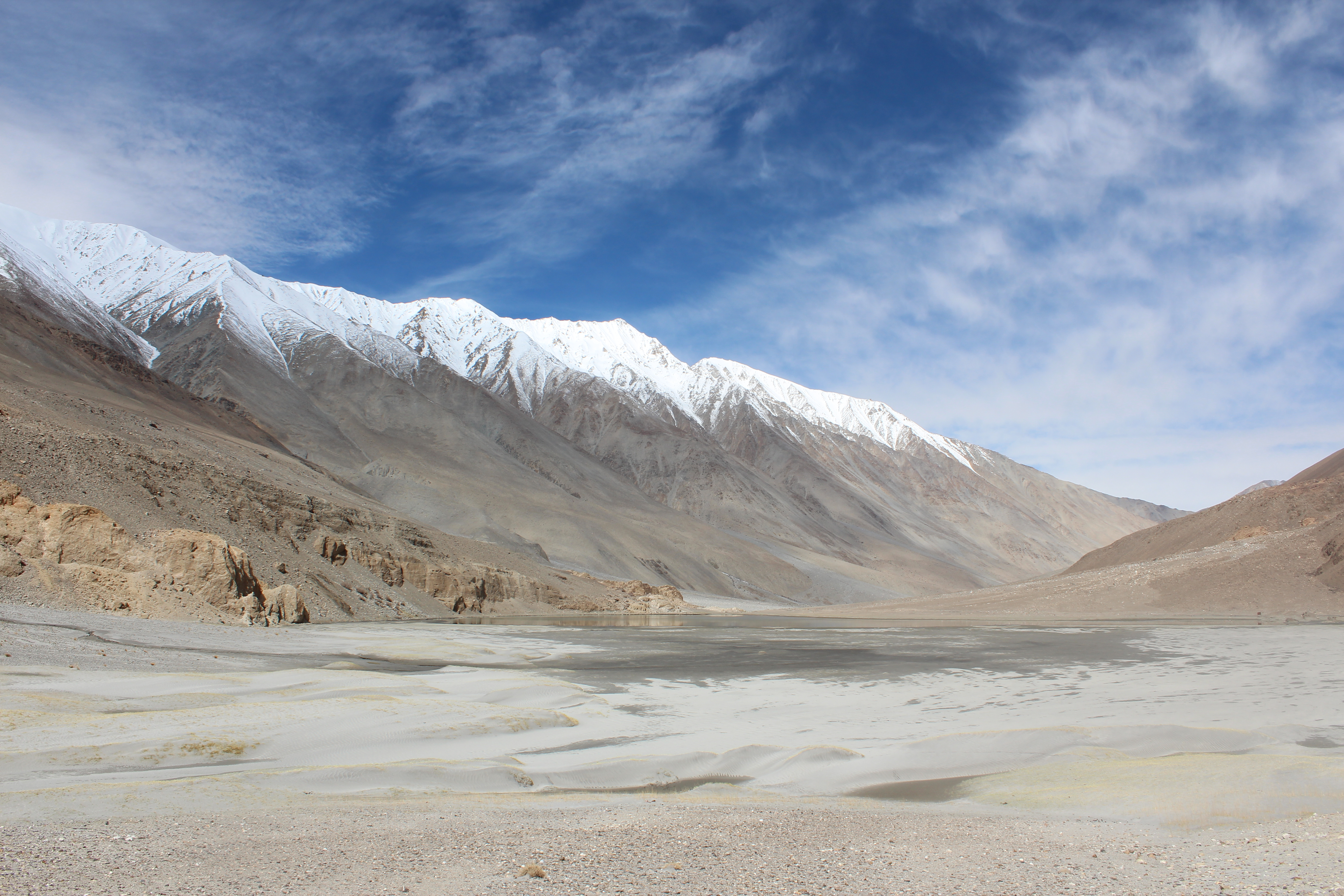
Changthang Wildlife Sanctuary

Wildlife Sanctuaries in Ladakh
Sanctuary	Declared	Area (km^{2})	District
Changthang Cold Desert Wildlife Sanctuary	1987	4000	Leh
Karakoram Wildlife Sanctuary	1987	5000	Leh

== Lakshadweep ==
Wildlife Sanctuaries in Lakshadweep
Sanctuary	Declared	Area (km^{2})	District
Pitti	2002	0.01	Lakshadweep

== Madhya Pradesh ==
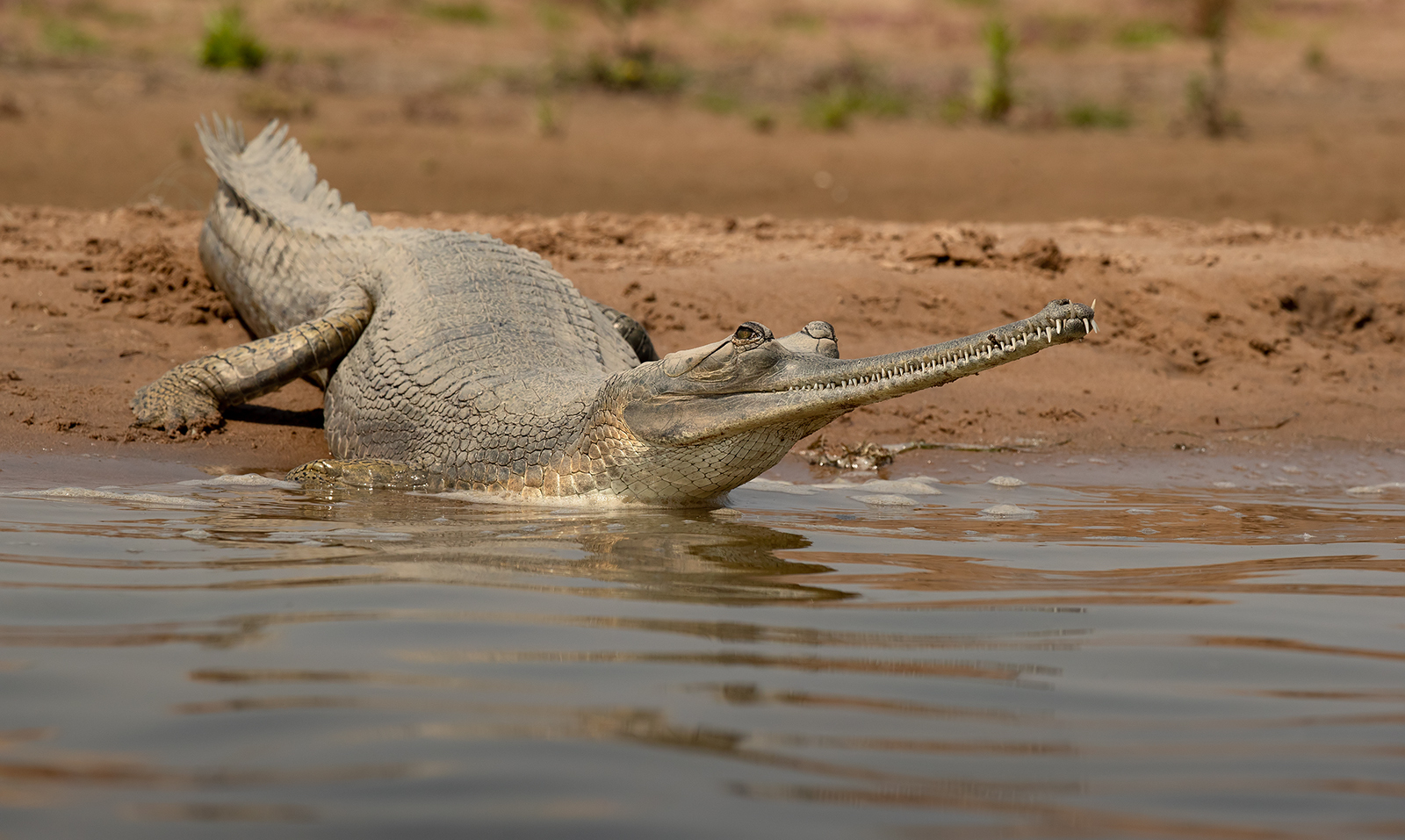
Gharial in National Chambal Sanctuary

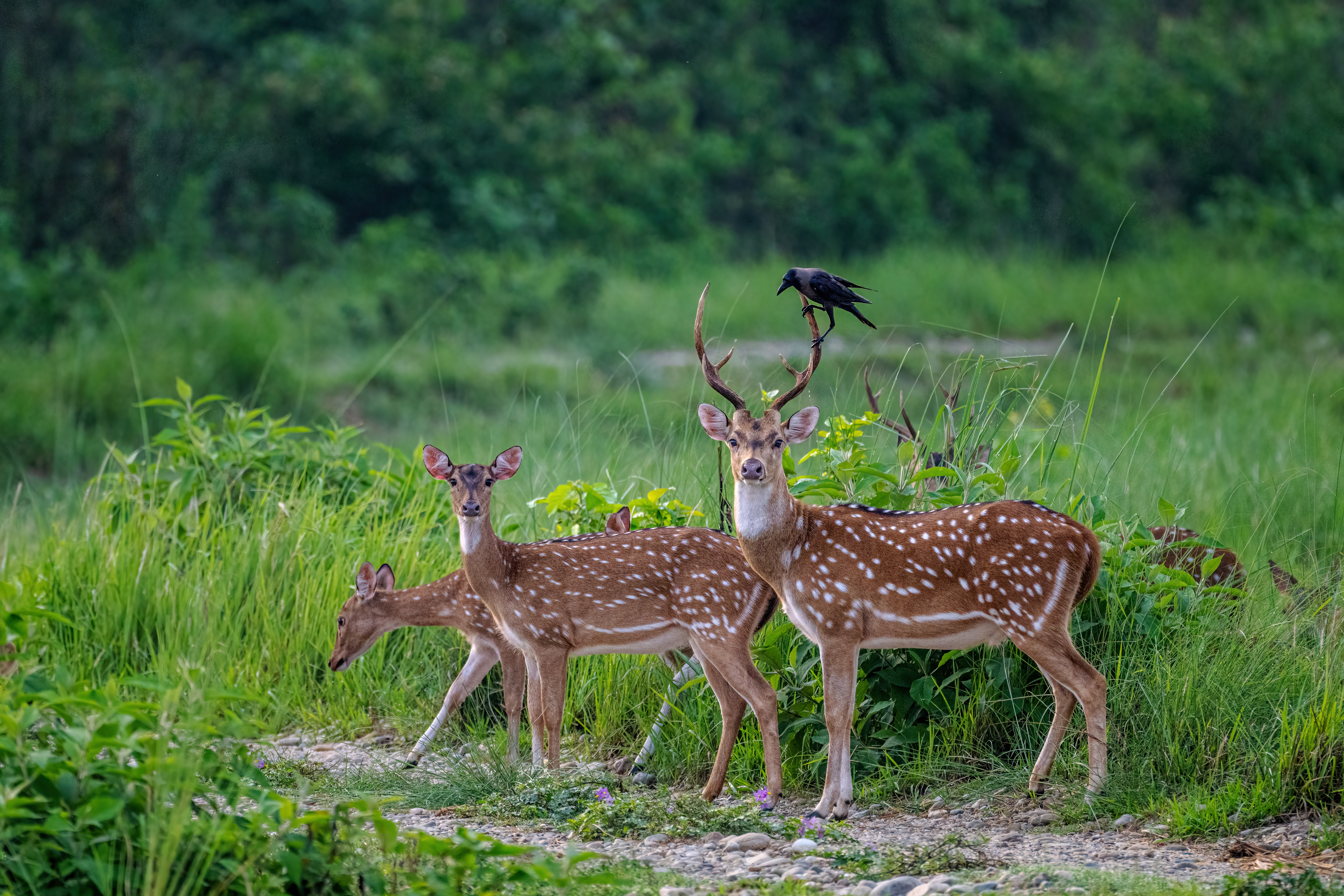
Spotted deer in Nauradehi Wildlife Sanctuary

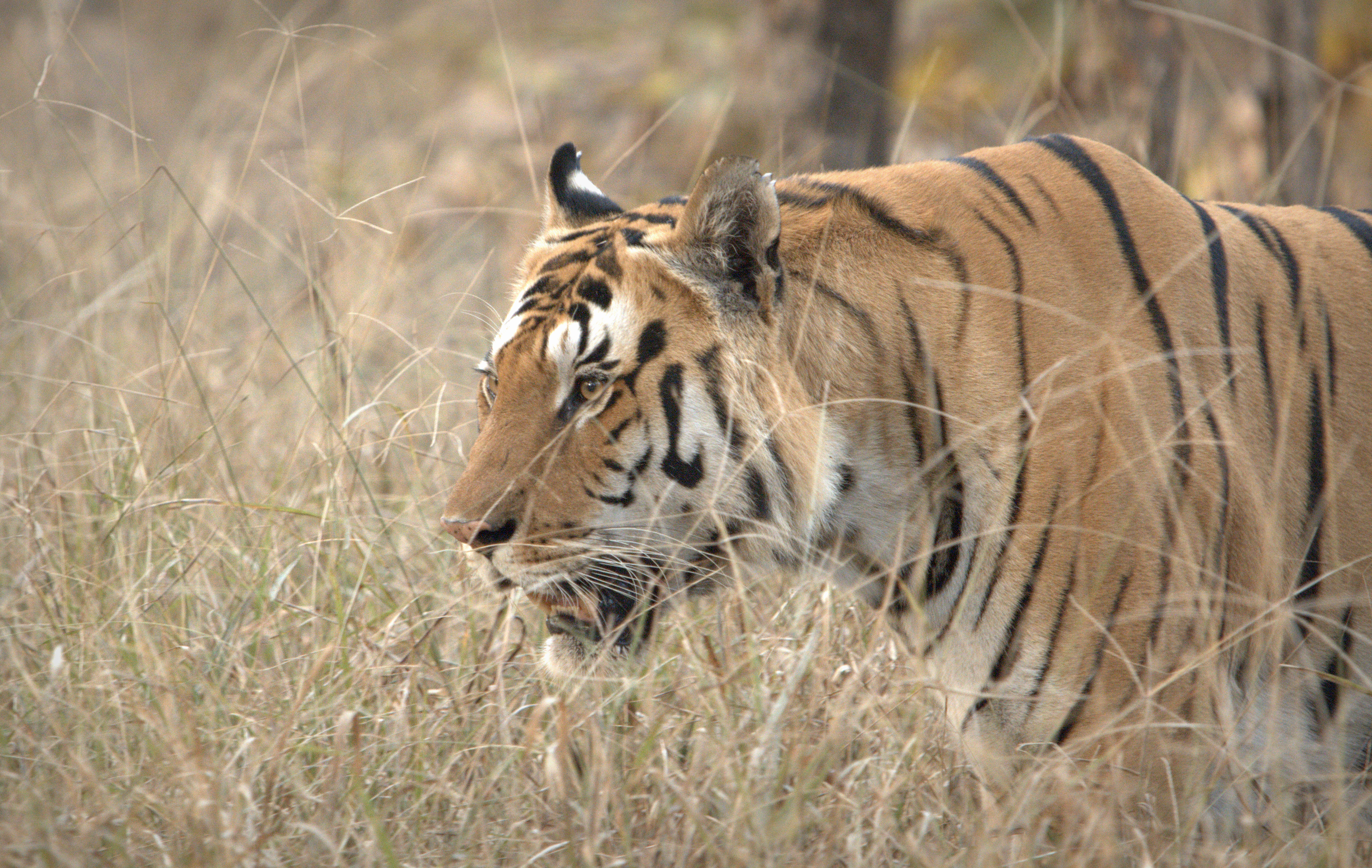
Bengal tiger in Pench Tiger Reserve

Wildlife Sanctuaries in Madhya Pradesh
Sanctuary	Declared	Area (km^{2})	District
Bagdara Wildlife Sanctuary	1978	478	Sidhi
Bori Wildlife Sanctuary	1977	485.72	Hoshangabad
Dr. Bhimrao Ambedkar Wildlife Sanctuary	2025	258.64	Sagar
Gandhi Sagar Sanctuary	1981	368.62	Mandsaur
Gangau Wildlife Sanctuary	1979	78.53	Chhatarpur
Ghatigaon Wildlife Sanctuary	1981	510.64	Gwalior
Karera Wildlife Sanctuary	1981	202.21	Shivpuri
Karmajhiri Wildlife Sanctuary	2022	14.1	Seoni
Ken Gharial Sanctuary	1981	45.2	Chhatarpur, Panna
Kheoni Wildlife Sanctuary	1982	134.78	Dewas, Sehore
Narsinghgarh Wildlife Sanctuary	1978	57.19	Raigarh
National Chambal Wildlife Sanctuary	1978	435	Morena, Bhind
Nauradehi Wildlife Sanctuary	1984	1197.04	Damoh, Narsimhapur, Sagar
Omkareshwar Wildlife Sanctuary	2025	611	Khandwa, Dewas
Orchha Wildlife Sanctuary	1994	44.91	Tikamgarh
Pachmarhi Wildlife Sanctuary	1977	491.63	Hoshangabad
Panpatha Wildlife Sanctuary	1983	245.84	Umaria
Pench Wildlife Sanctuary	1975	118.47	Chhindwara, Seoni
Phen Wildlife Sanctuary	1983	110.74	Mandla
Ralamandal Wildlife Sanctuary	1989	2.35	Indore
Ratapani Wildlife Sanctuary	1978	910.64	Raisen
Sailana Wildlife Sanctuary	1983	12.97	Ratlam
Sanjay Dubri Wildlife Sanctuary	1975	347.94	Sidhi
Sardarpur Wildlife Sanctuary	1983	348.12	Dhar
Singhori Wildlife Sanctuary	1976	312.04	Raisen
Son Gharial Wildlife Sanctuary	1981	83.68	Satna, Shahdol, Sidhi
Veerangana Durgavati Wildlife Sanctuary	1997	23.97	Damoh

== Maharashtra ==
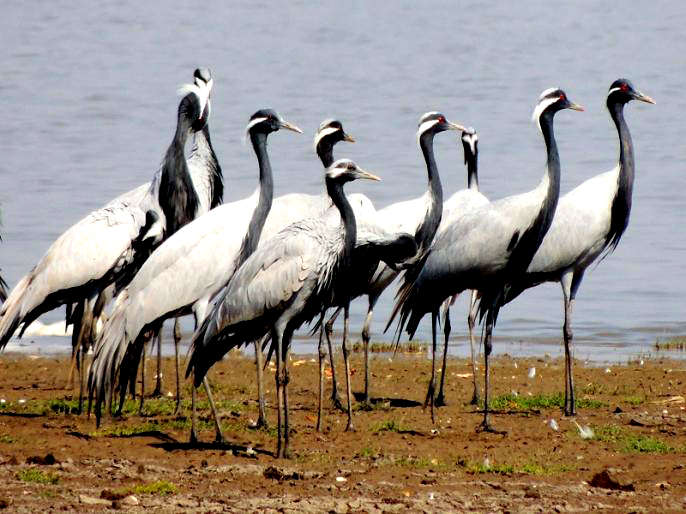
Demoiselle cranes in Jayakwadi Bird Sanctuary

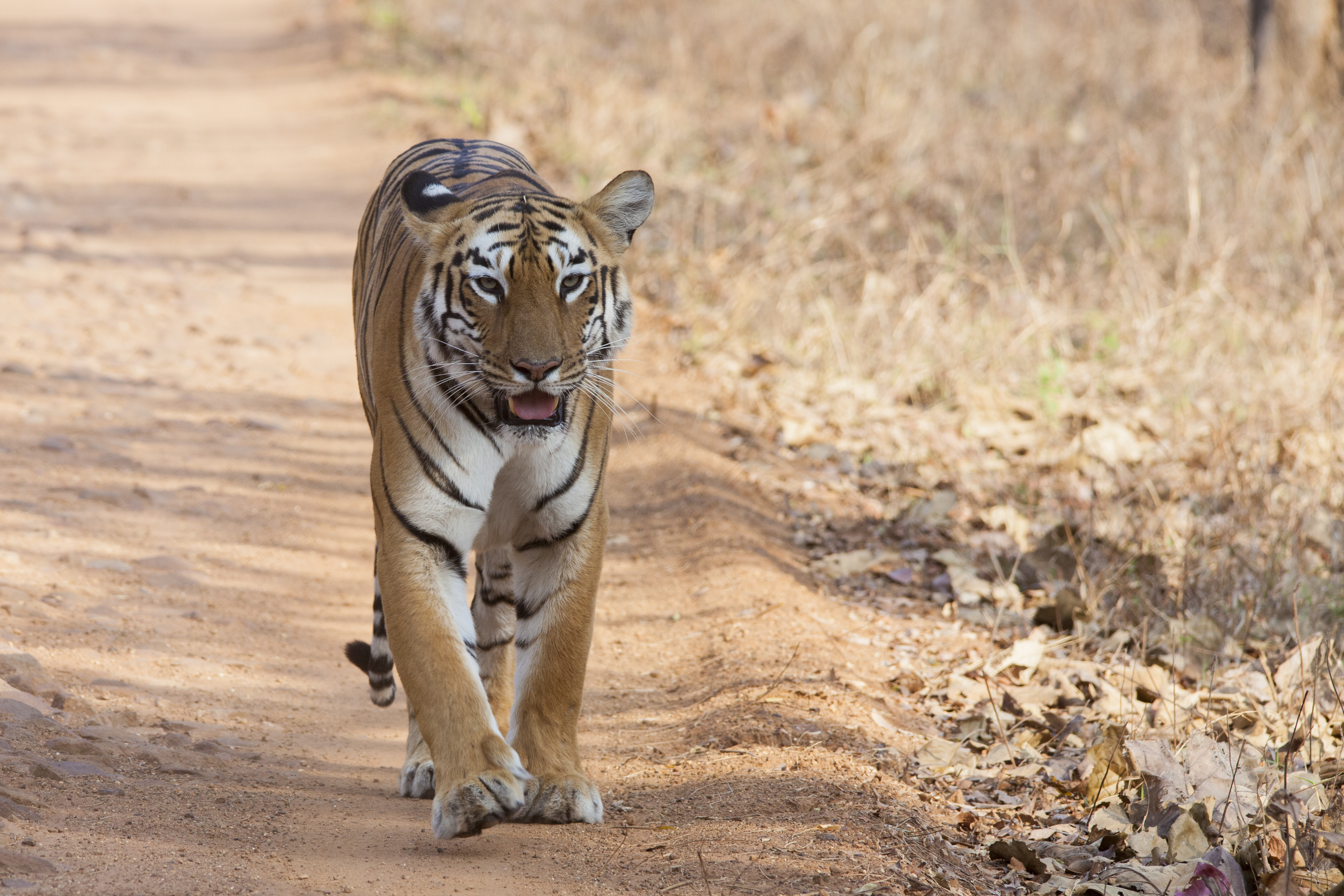
Bengal Tiger in Andhari Wildlife Sanctuary

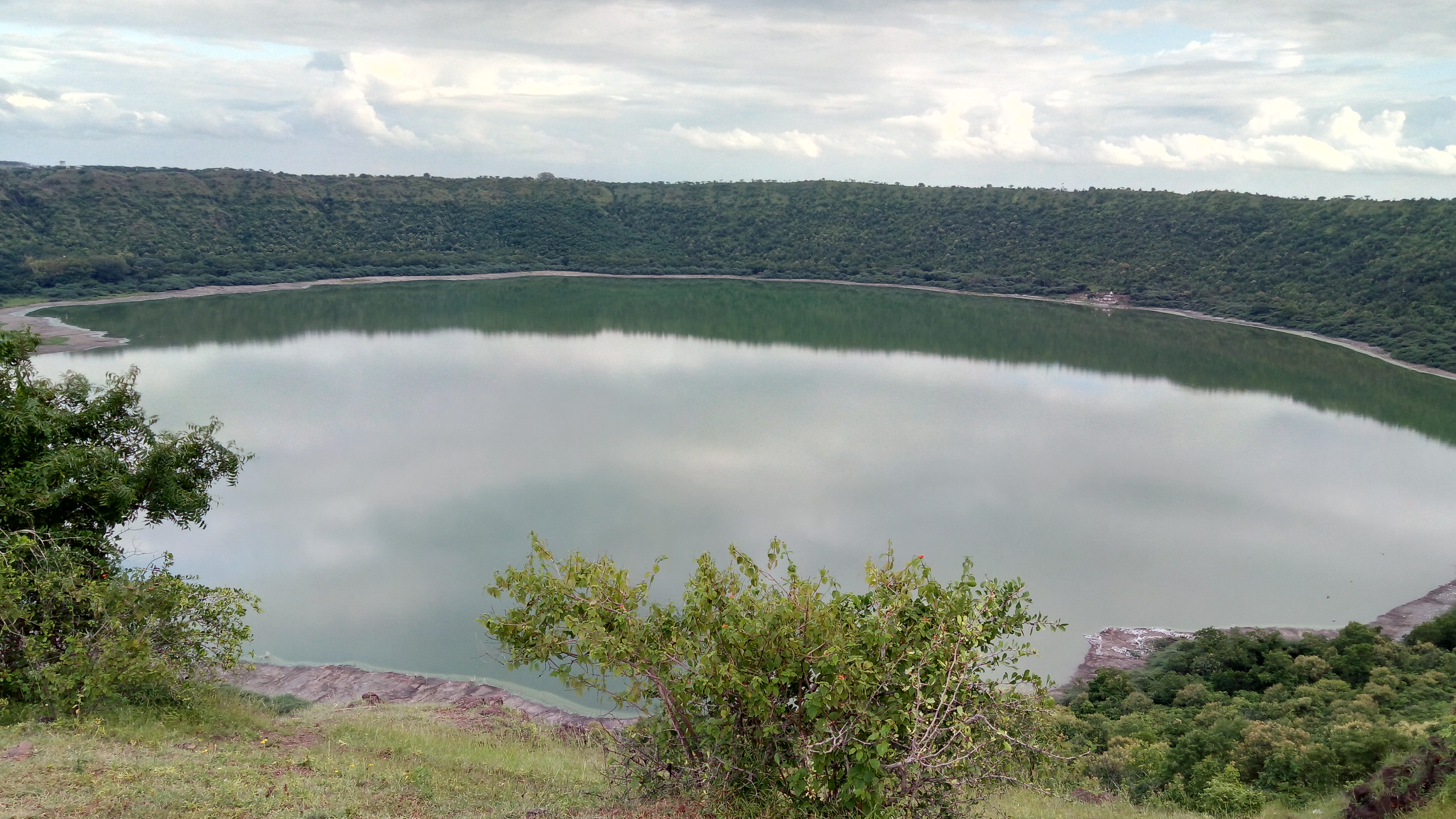
Lonar Lake, India's only meteorite impact crater lake, in Lonar Wildlife Sanctuary

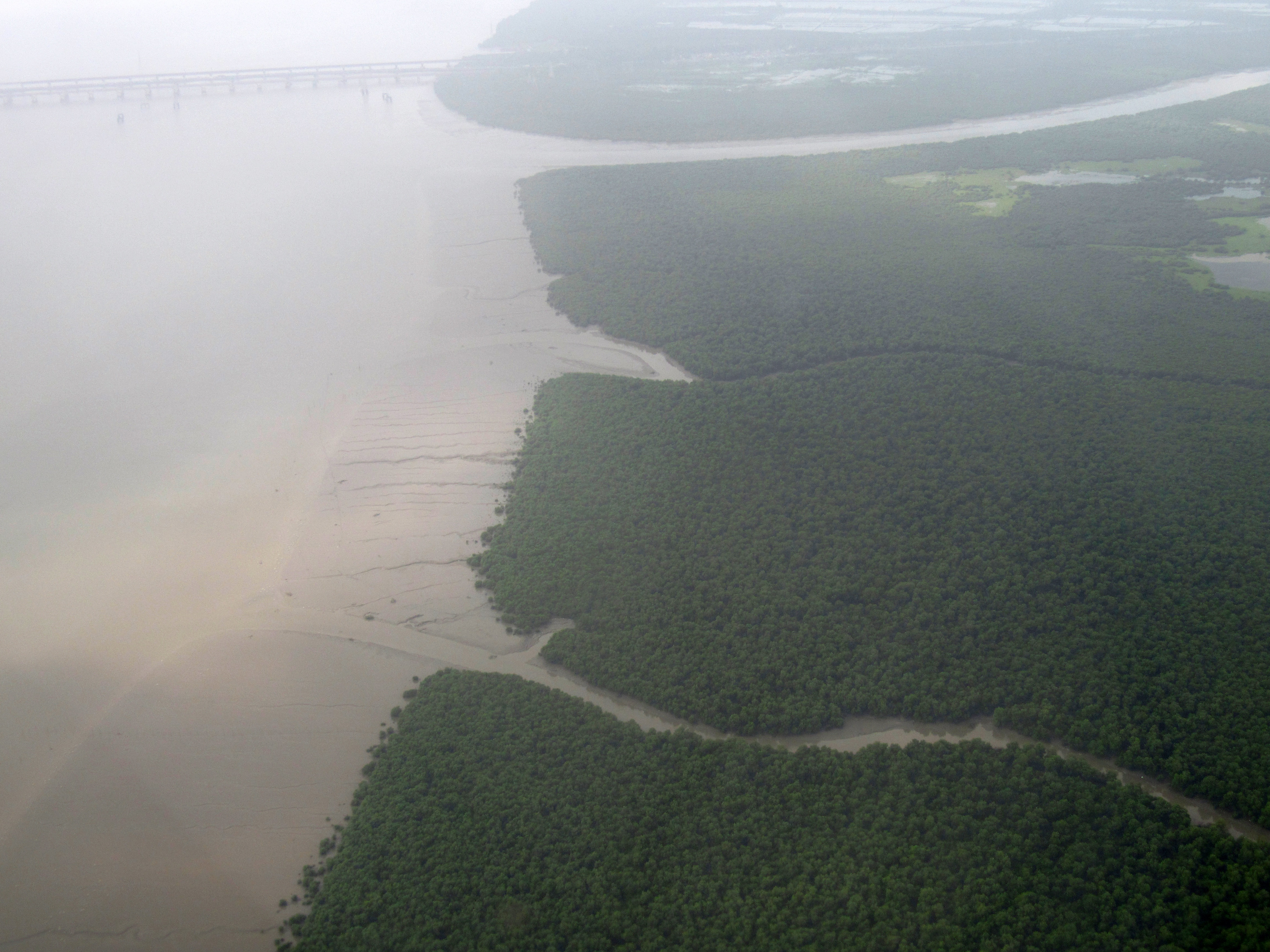
Thane creek

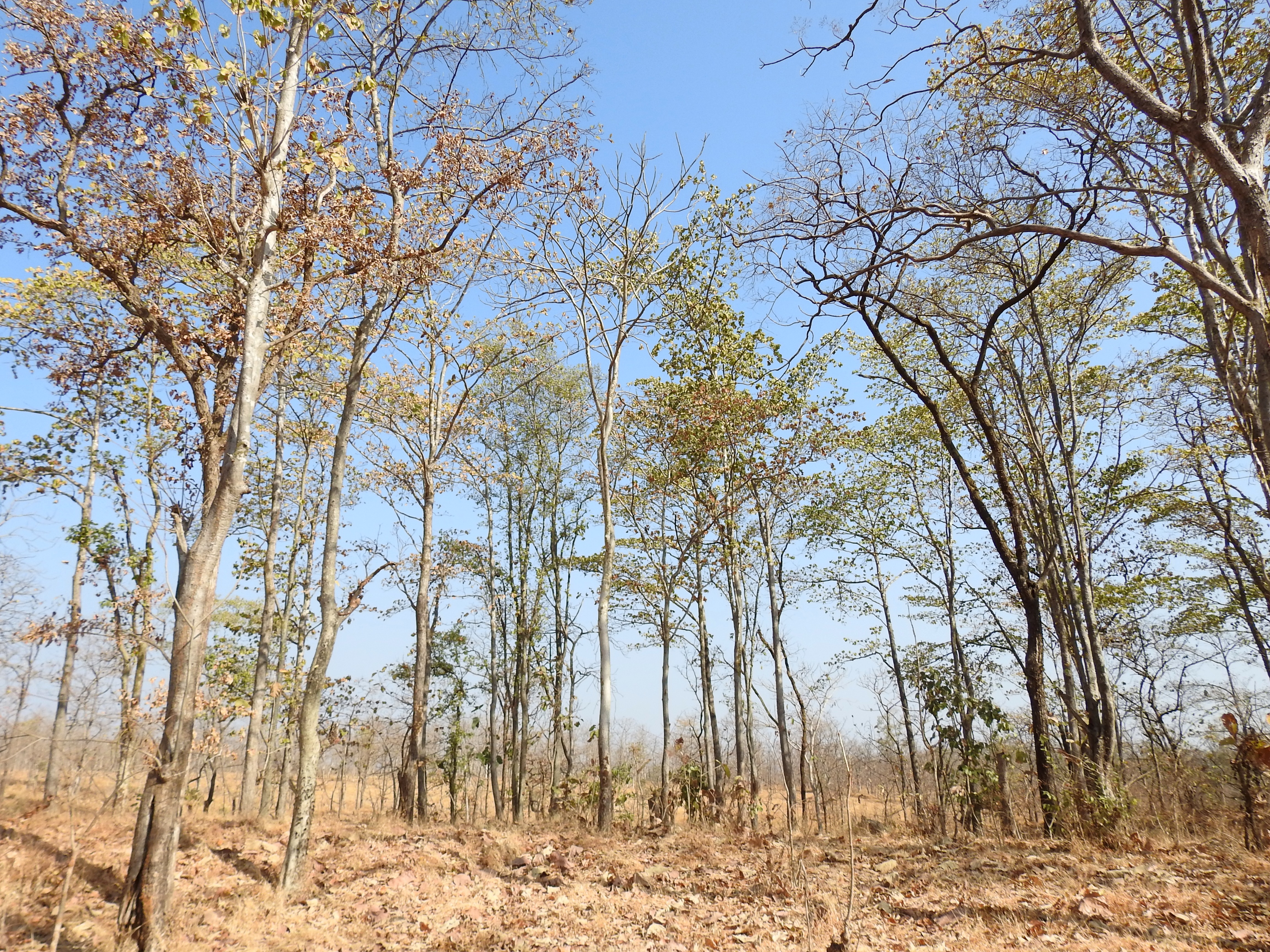
Dry forests in Tansa Wildlife Sanctuary

Wildlife Sanctuaries in Maharashtra
Sanctuary	Declared	Area (km^{2})	District
Amba Barwa Wildlife Sanctuary	1997	127.11	Buldhana
Andhari Wildlife Sanctuary	1986	509.27	Chandrapur
Aner Dam Wildlife Sanctuary	1986	82.94	Dhule
Bhamragarh Wildlife Sanctuary	1997	104.38	Gadchiroli
Bhimashankar Wildlife Sanctuary	1985	130.78	Pune, Raigad, Thane
Bor Wildlife Sanctuary	1970	61.1	Nagpur, Wardha
Chaprala Wildlife Sanctuary	1986	134.78	Gadchiroli
Deolgaon‑Rehkuri Wildlife Sanctuary	1980	2.17	Ahmednagar
Dnyanganga Wildlife Sanctuary	1997	205.21	Buldhana
Gautala Wildlife Sanctuary	1986	260.61	Aurangabad, Jalgaon
Ghodazari Wildlife Sanctuary	2018	153.31	Chandrapur
Great Indian Bustard Sanctuary	1979	366.73	Ahmednagar, Solapur
Isapur Wildlife Sanctuary	2014	37.8	Yavatmal
Jayakwadi Bird Sanctuary	1986	341.05	Ahmednagar, Aurangabad
Kalsubai Harishchandragad Wildlife Sanctuary	1986	361.71	Ahmednagar
Kanhargaon Wildlife Sanctuary	2021	269.4	Chandrapur
Karanja Sohol Wildlife Sanctuary	2000	18.32	Akola
Karnala Bird Sanctuary	1968	12.16	Raigad
Katepurna Wildlife Sanctuary	1988	73.68	Akola
Koka Wildlife Sanctuary	2013	100.14	Bhandara
Koyna Wildlife Sanctuary	1985	335.3	Satara
Lonar Wildlife Sanctuary	2000	3.83	Buldhana
Malvan Wildlife Sanctuary	1987	29.12	Sindhudurg
Mayureswar Wildlife Sanctuary	1997	5.15	Pune
Mansingdeo Wildlife Sanctuary	2010	182.58	Nagpur
Melghat Wildlife Sanctuary	1985	778.75	Amravati
Nagzira Wildlife Sanctuary	1970	152.81	Bhandara
Naigaon Mayur Wildlife Sanctuary	1994	29.89	Beed
Nandur Madhameshwar Wildlife Sanctuary	1986	100.12	Nashik
Narnala Wildlife Sanctuary	1997	12.35	Akola
Nawegaon Wildlife Sanctuary	2012	122.76	Gondia
New Bor Wildlife Sanctuary	2012	60.7	Nagpur, Wardha
New Maldhok Bird (Gangewadi) Wildlife Sanctuary	2015	1.98	Solapur
New Nagzira Wildlife Sanctuary	2012	151.33	Bhandara
Painganga Wildlife Sanctuary	1986	424.89	Nanded, Yavatmal
Phansad Wildlife Sanctuary	1986	69.79	Raigad
Pranhita Wildlife Sanctuary	2014	420.06	Gadchiroli
Radhanagari Wildlife Sanctuary	1958	351.16	Kolhapur
Sagareshwar Wildlife Sanctuary	1985	10.87	Sangli
Sudhagad Wildlife Sanctuary	2014	77.13	Raigad
Tamhini Wildlife Sanctuary	2013	49.62	Pune
Tansa Wildlife Sanctuary	1970	304.81	Thane
Thane Creek Wildlife Sanctuary	2015	16.9	Thane
Tipeshwar Wildlife Sanctuary	1997	148.63	Yavatmal
Tungareshwar Wildlife Sanctuary	2003	85	Palghar
Umred Pauni Karhandla Wildlife Sanctuary	2012	189.29	Bhandara, Nagpur
Wan Wildlife Sanctuary	1997	211	Amravati
Yawal Wildlife Sanctuary	1969	177.52	Jalgaon
Yedsi Ramling Ghat Wildlife Sanctuary	1997	22.38	Osmanabad

== Manipur ==
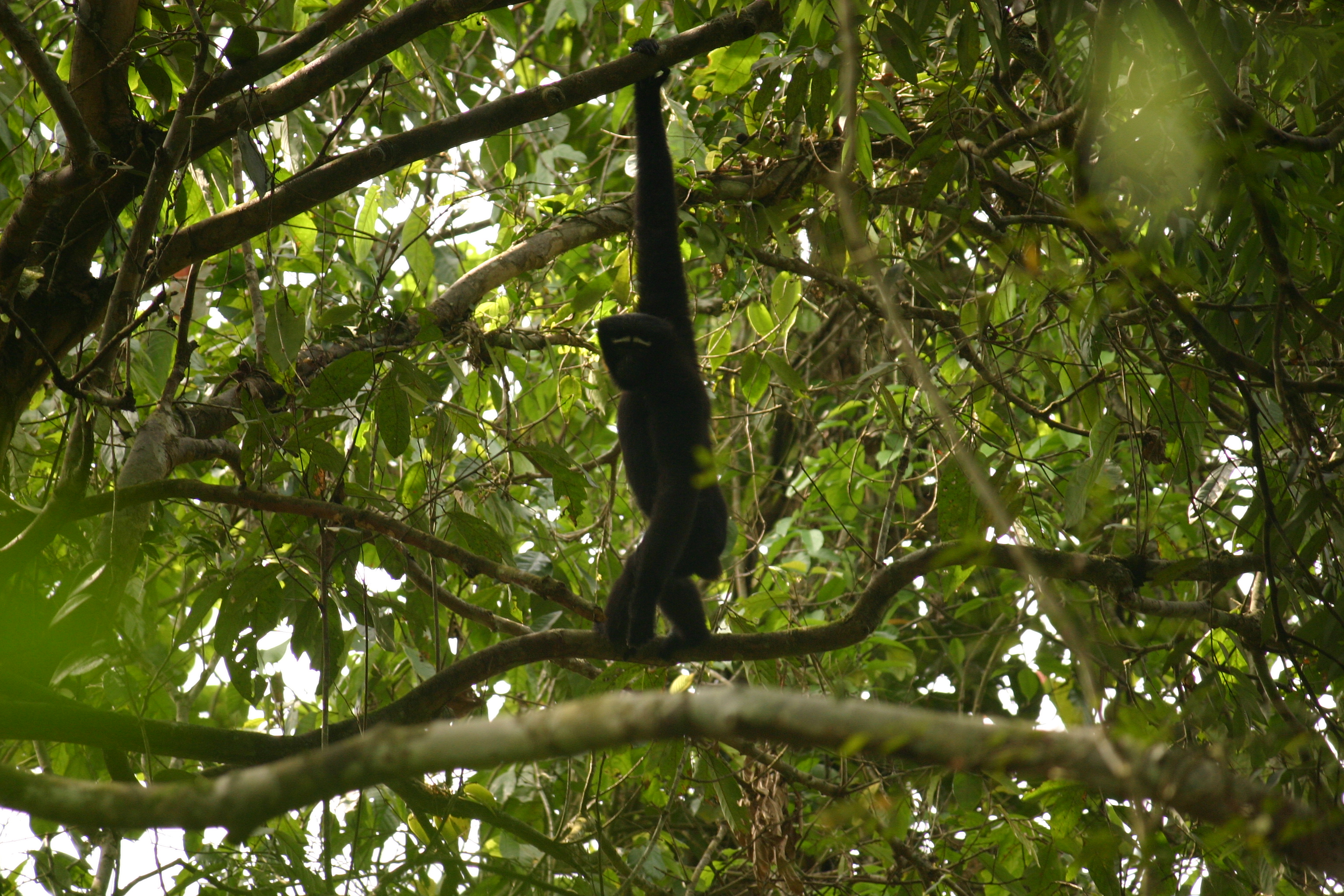
Hoolock gibbon in Yangoupokpi-Lokchao Wildlife Sanctuary

Wildlife Sanctuaries in Manipur
Sanctuary	Declared	Area (km^{2})	District
Bunning Wildlife Sanctuary	1997	115.8	Tamenglong
Jiri-Makru Wildlife Sanctuary	1997	198	Imphal East, Tamenglong
Kailam Wildlife Sanctuary	1997	187.5	Churachandpur
Khongjaingamba Ching Wildlife Sanctuary	2016	0.41	Imphal East
Thinungei Bird Sanctuary	2019	1.03	Bishnupur
Yangoupokpi-Lokchao Wildlife Sanctuary	1989	184.4	Chandel
Zeilad Wildlife Sanctuary	1997	21	Tamenglong

== Meghalaya ==
Wildlife Sanctuaries in Meghalaya
Sanctuary	Declared	Area (km^{2})	District
Baghmara Pitcher Plant Wildlife Sanctuary	1984	0.02	South Garo Hills
Narpuh Wildlife Sanctuary	2014	59.9	East Jaintia Hills, West Jaintia Hills
Nongkhyllem Wildlife Sanctuary	1981	29	Ri Bhoi
Siju Wildlife Sanctuary	1979	5.18	South Garo Hills

== Mizoram ==
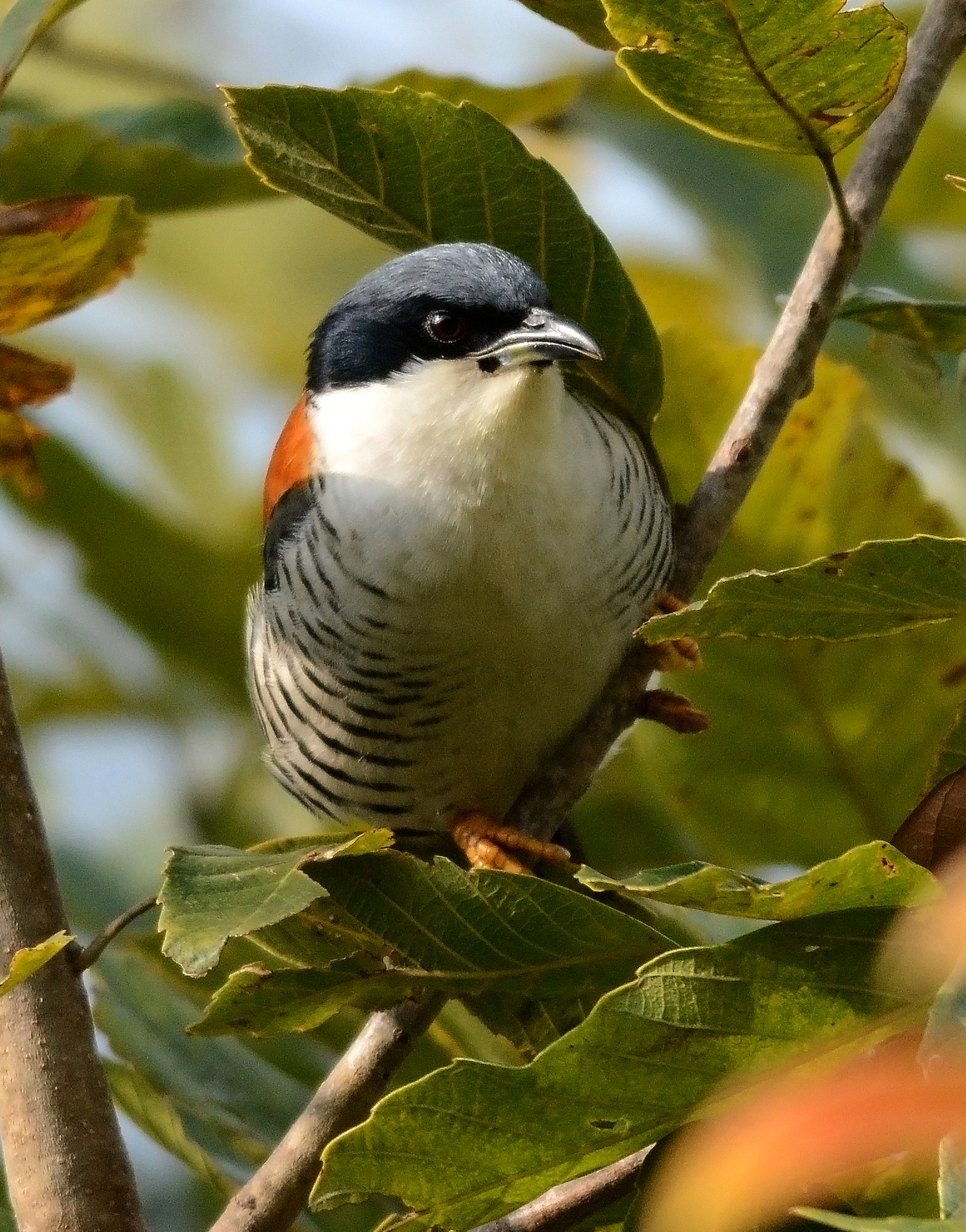
Himalayan cutia in Lengteng Wildlife Sanctuary

Wildlife Sanctuaries in Mizoram
Sanctuary	Declared	Area (km^{2})	District
Dampa Wildlife Sanctuary	1985	500	Aizawl
Khawnglung Wildlife Sanctuary	2000	35	Serchhip
Lengteng Wildlife Sanctuary	2002	60	Champhai
Ngengpui Wildlife Sanctuary	1997	110	Lawngtlai
Pualreng Wildlife Sanctuary	2013	50	Kolasib
Tawi Wildlife Sanctuary	2001	35.75	Lunglei
Thorangtlang Wildlife Sanctuary	2015	180	Lunglei
Tokalo Wildlife Sanctuary	2007	250	Saiha

== Nagaland ==
Wildlife Sanctuaries in Nagaland
Sanctuary	Declared	Area (km^{2})	District
Fakim Wildlife Sanctuary	1980	6.42	Tuensang
Puliebadze Wildlife Sanctuary	1980	9.23	Kohima
Rangapahar Wildlife Sanctuary	1986	4.7	Dimapur
Singphan Wildlife Sanctuary	2009	23.57	Mon

== Odisha ==
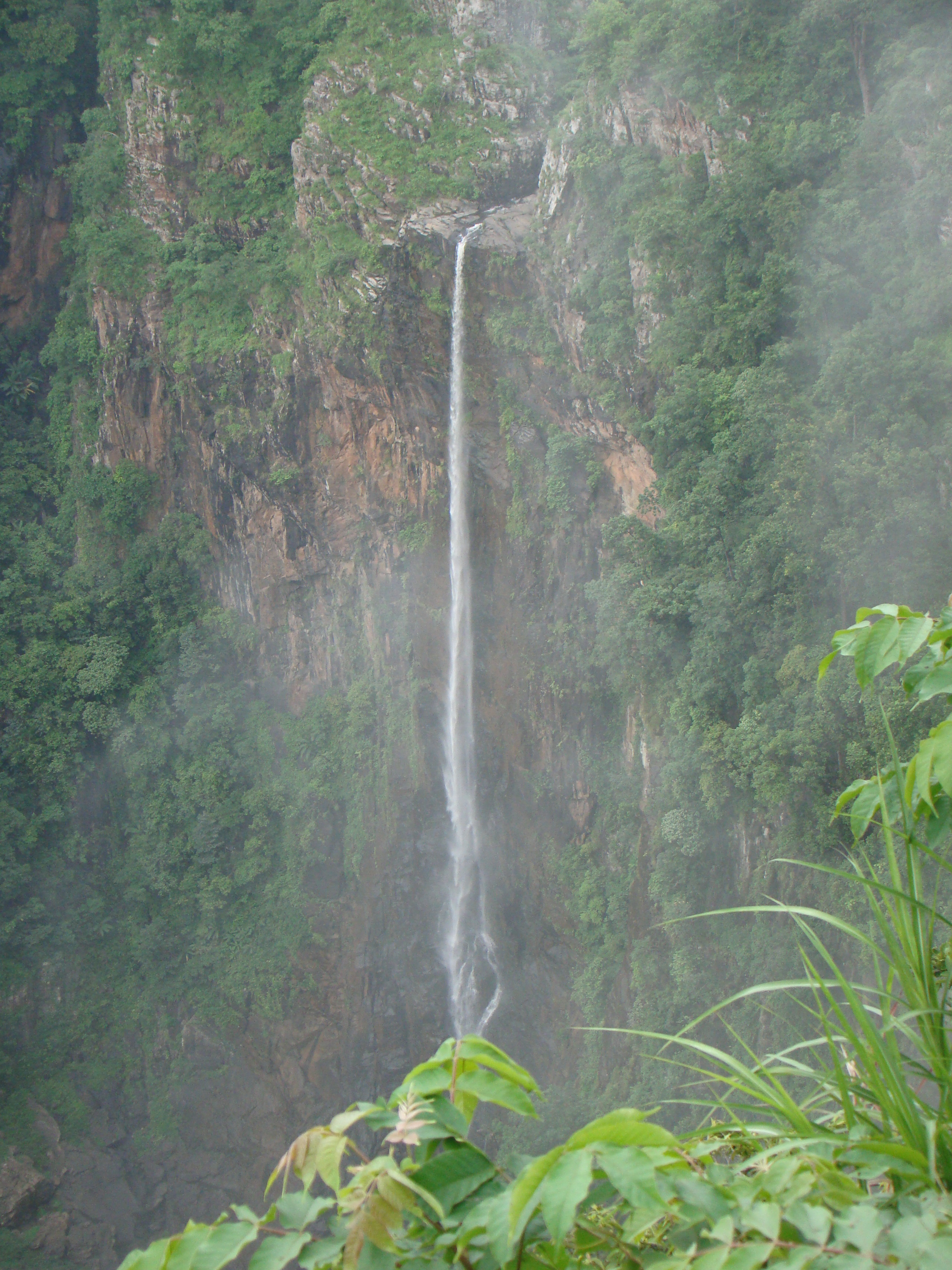
A waterfall in Simlipal Wildlife Sanctuary

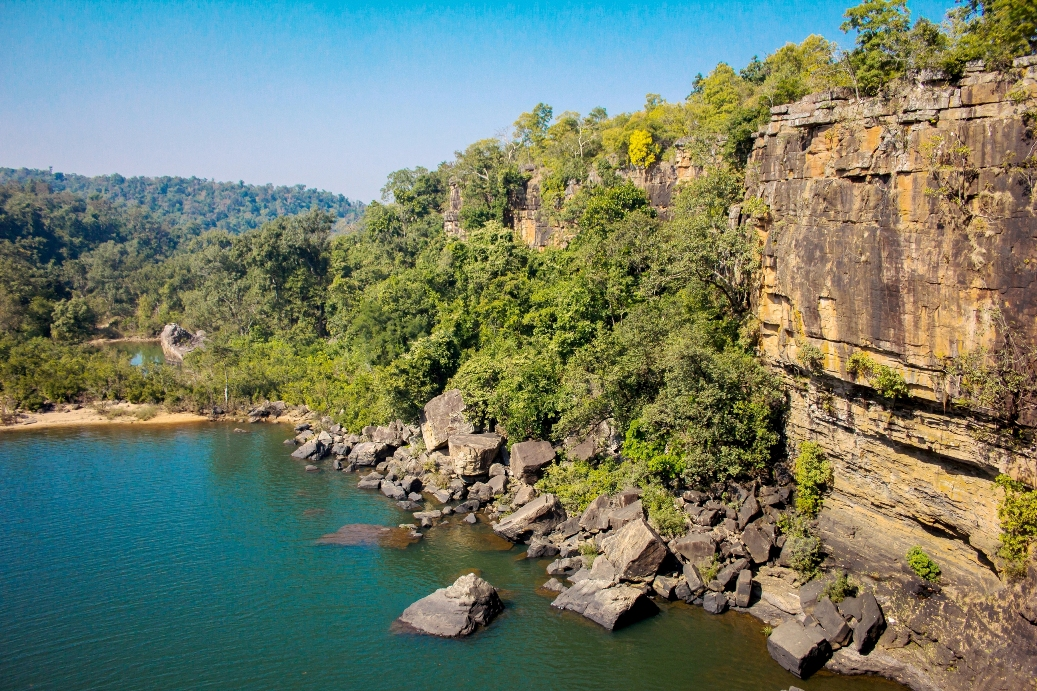
Cliffs in Sunabeda Wildlife Sanctuary

Wildlife Sanctuaries in Odisha
Sanctuary	Declared	Area (km^{2})	District
Badrama Wildlife Sanctuary	1962	304.03	Sambalpur
Baisipalli Wildlife Sanctuary	1981	168.35	Nayagarh
Balukhand-Konark Wildlife Sanctuary	1984	71.72	Puri
Bhitarkanika Wildlife Sanctuary	1975	525	Kendrapara
Chandaka Dampara Wildlife Sanctuary	1982	175.79	Khurda, Cuttack
Debrigarh Wildlife Sanctuary	1985	346.91	Sambalpur
Gahirmatha Marine Sanctuary	1997	1435	Kendrapara
Hadgarh Wildlife Sanctuary	1978	191.06	Keonjhar, Mayurbhanj
Kapilasa Wildlife Sanctuary	2011	125.5	Dhenkanal
Karlapat Wildlife Sanctuary	1992	147.66	Kalahandi
Khalasuni Wildlife Sanctuary	1982	116	Sambalpur
Kotgarh Wildlife Sanctuary	1981	399.5	Phulbani
Kuldiha Wildlife Sanctuary	1984	272.75	Balasore
Lakhari Valley Wildlife Sanctuary	1985	185.87	Gajapati
Nalbana Bird Sanctuary	1987	15.53	Ganjam, Khurda, Puri
Nandankanan Wildlife Sanctuary	1979	14.16	Khurda
Satkosia Gorge Wildlife Sanctuary	1976	745.52	Angul, Boudh, Cuttack
Simlipal Wildlife Sanctuary	1979	1354.3	Mayurbhanj
Sunabeda Wildlife Sanctuary	1988	500	Nuapada

== Punjab ==
Wildlife Sanctuaries in Punjab
Sanctuary	Declared	Area (km^{2})	District
Abohar Wildlife Sanctuary	1988	186.5	Firozpur
Bir Aishvan Wildlife Sanctuary	1952	2.64	Sangrur
Bir Bhadson Wildlife Sanctuary	1952	10.23	Patiala
Bir Bhunerheri Wildlife Sanctuary	1952	6.62	Patiala
Bir Dosanjh Wildlife Sanctuary	1952	5.18	Patiala
Bir Gurdialpura Wildlife Sanctuary	1977	6.2	Patiala
Bir Mehaswala Wildlife Sanctuary	1952	1.23	Patiala
Bir Motibagh Wildlife Sanctuary	1952	6.54	Patiala
Harike Lake Wildlife Sanctuary	1982	86	Firozpur
Jhajjar Bacholi Wildlife Sanctuary	1998	1.16	Rupnagar
Kathlaur Kushlian Wildlife Sanctuary	2007	7.58	Gurdaspur
Nangal Wildlife Sanctuary	2009	2.9	Rupnagar
Takhni-Rehampur Wildlife Sanctuary	1992	3.82	Hoshiarpur

== Puducherry ==
Wildlife Sanctuaries in Puducherry
Sanctuary	Declared	Area (km^{2})	District
Oussudu Bird Sanctuary	2008	3.9	Puducherry

== Rajasthan ==
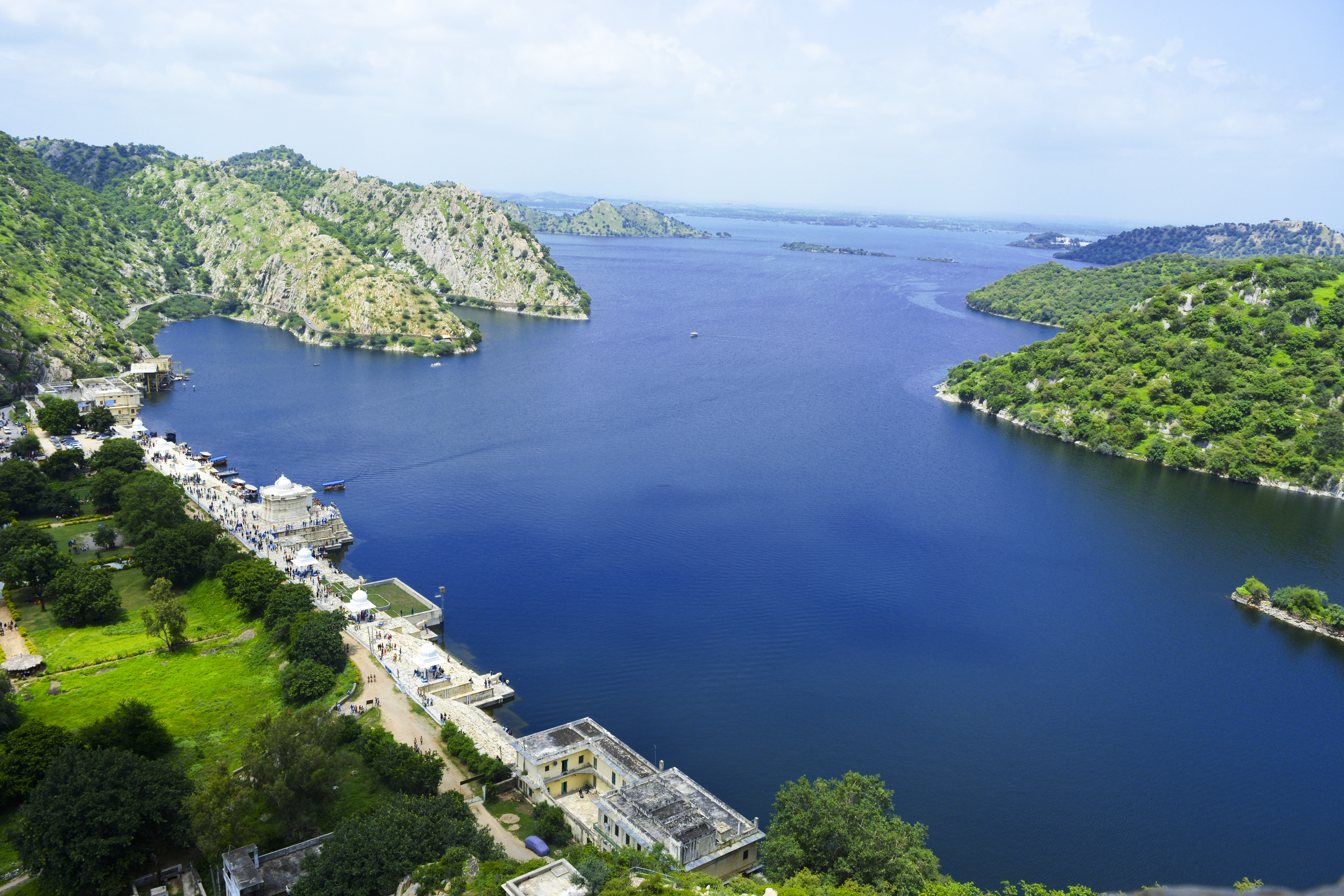
Dhebar Lake in Jaisamand Wildlife Sanctuary

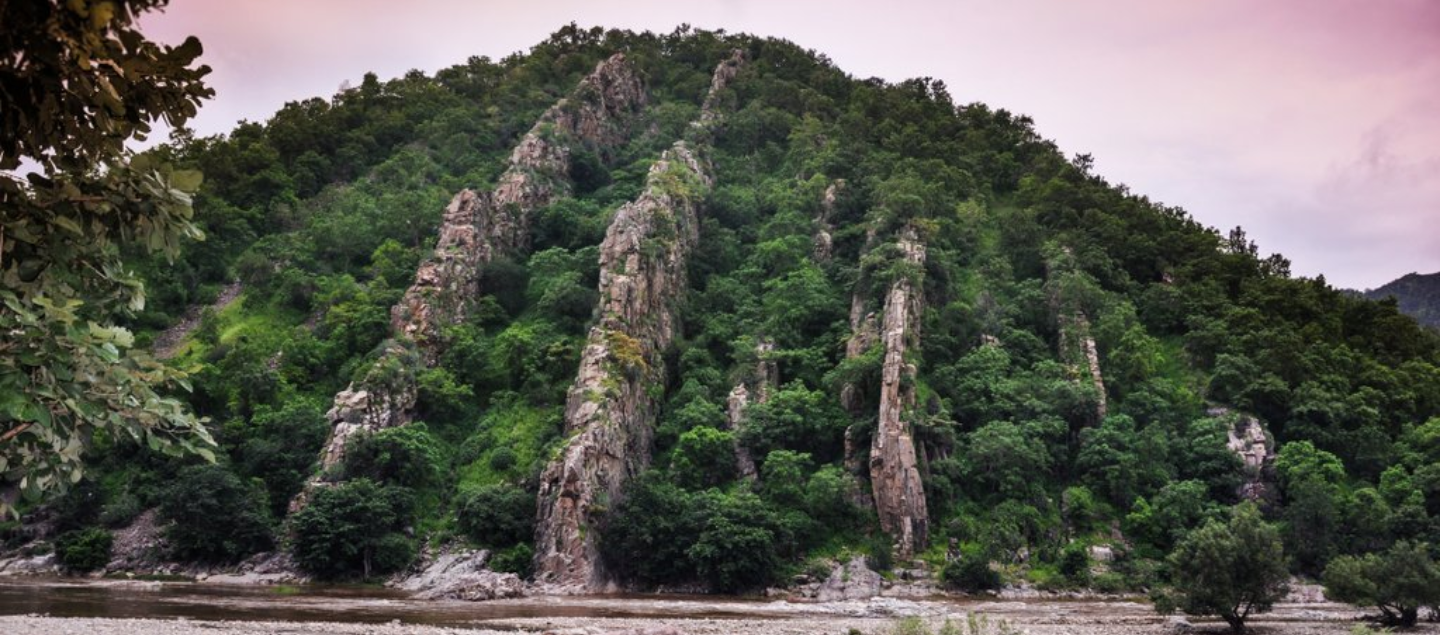
Rocks in Phulwari Ki Nal Wildlife Sanctuary

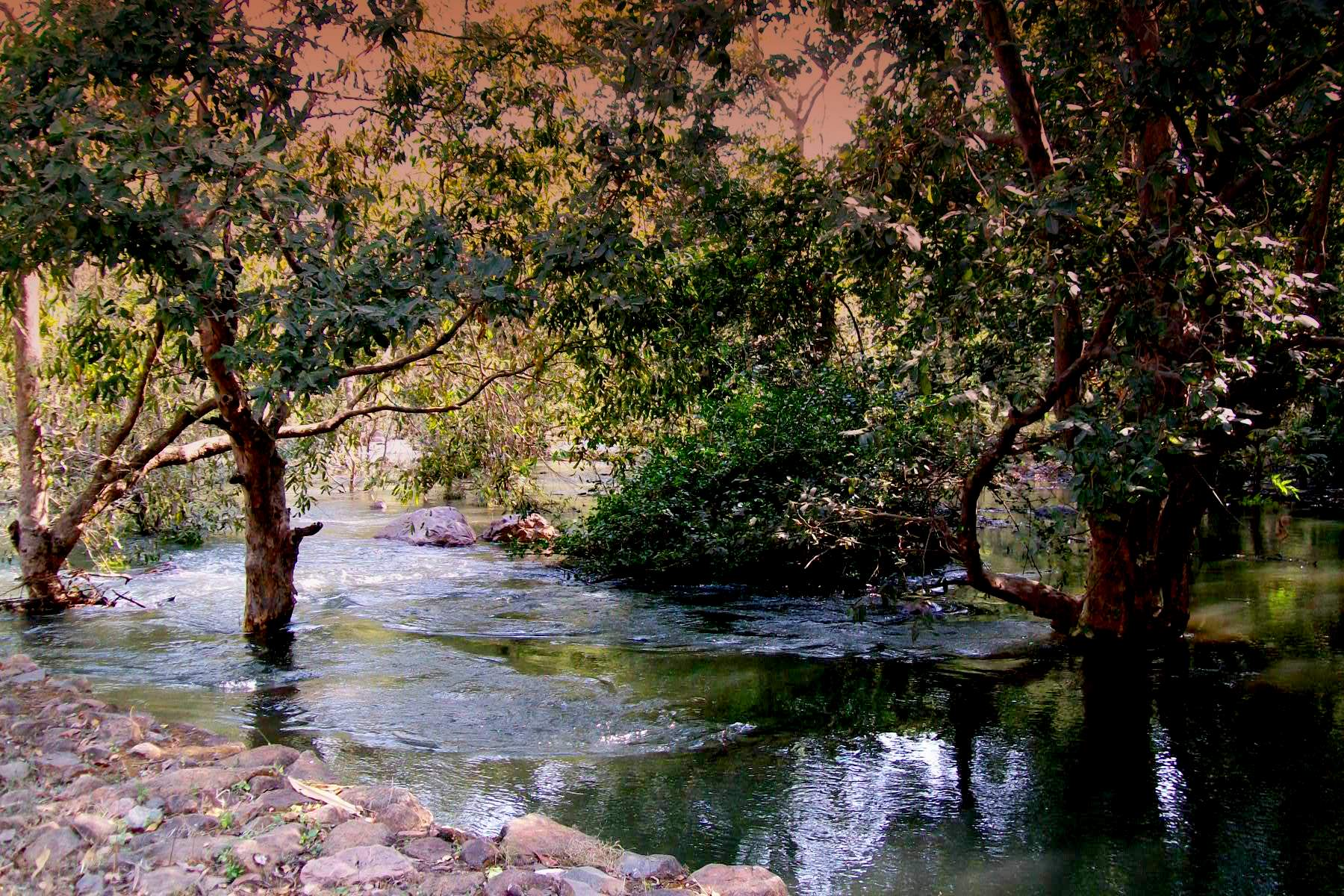
A stream in Sita Mata Wildlife Sanctuary

Wildlife Sanctuaries in Rajasthan
Sanctuary	Declared	Area (km^{2})	District
Bandh Baretha Wildlife Sanctuary	1985	171.39	Bharatpur, Karauli
Bassi Wildlife Sanctuary	1988	138.69	Chittaurgarh
Bhensrodgarh Wildlife Sanctuary	1983	201.4	Chittaurgarh
Darrah Wildlife Sanctuary	1955	227.63	Jhalawar, Kota
Desert National Sanctuary	1981	3162	Barmer, Jaisalmer
Jaisamand Wildlife Sanctuary	1955	52.34	Rajsamand
Jamwa Ramgarh Wildlife Sanctuary	1982	300	Jaipur
Jawahar Sagar Wildlife Sanctuary	1975	194.6	Kota
Kailadevi Wildlife Sanctuary	1983	676.82	Karauli
Kesarbagh Wildlife Sanctuary	1955	14.76	Dholpur
Kumbhalgarh Wildlife Sanctuary	1971	610.53	Pali, Udaipur
Mount Abu Wildlife Sanctuary	1960	103.97	Sirohi
Nahargarh Wildlife Sanctuary	1980	52.4	Jaipur
National Chambal Wildlife Sanctuary	1979	564.03	Kota
Phulwari Ki Nal Wildlife Sanctuary	1983	511.41	Pali, Udaipur
Ramgarh Vishdhari Wildlife Sanctuary	1982	303.05	Bundi
Ramsagar Wildlife Sanctuary	1955	34.4	Dholpur
Sajjangarh Wildlife Sanctuary	1987	5.19	Udaipur
Sariska Wildlife Sanctuary	1955	544.22	Alwar
Sawai Madhopur Wildlife Sanctuary	1955	131.3	Sawai Madhopur
Sawai Man Singh Wildlife Sanctuary	1984	113.07	Sawai Madhopur
Shergarh Wildlife Sanctuary	1983	81.67	Kota
Sita Mata Wildlife Sanctuary	1979	422.94	Chittaurgarh, Udaipur
Tal Chhapar Wildlife Sanctuary	1971	7.19	Churu
Todgarh-Raoli Wildlife Sanctuary	1983	495.27	Ajmer, Pali, Rajsamand
Van Vihar Wildlife Sanctuary	1955	25.6	Dholpur

== Sikkim ==
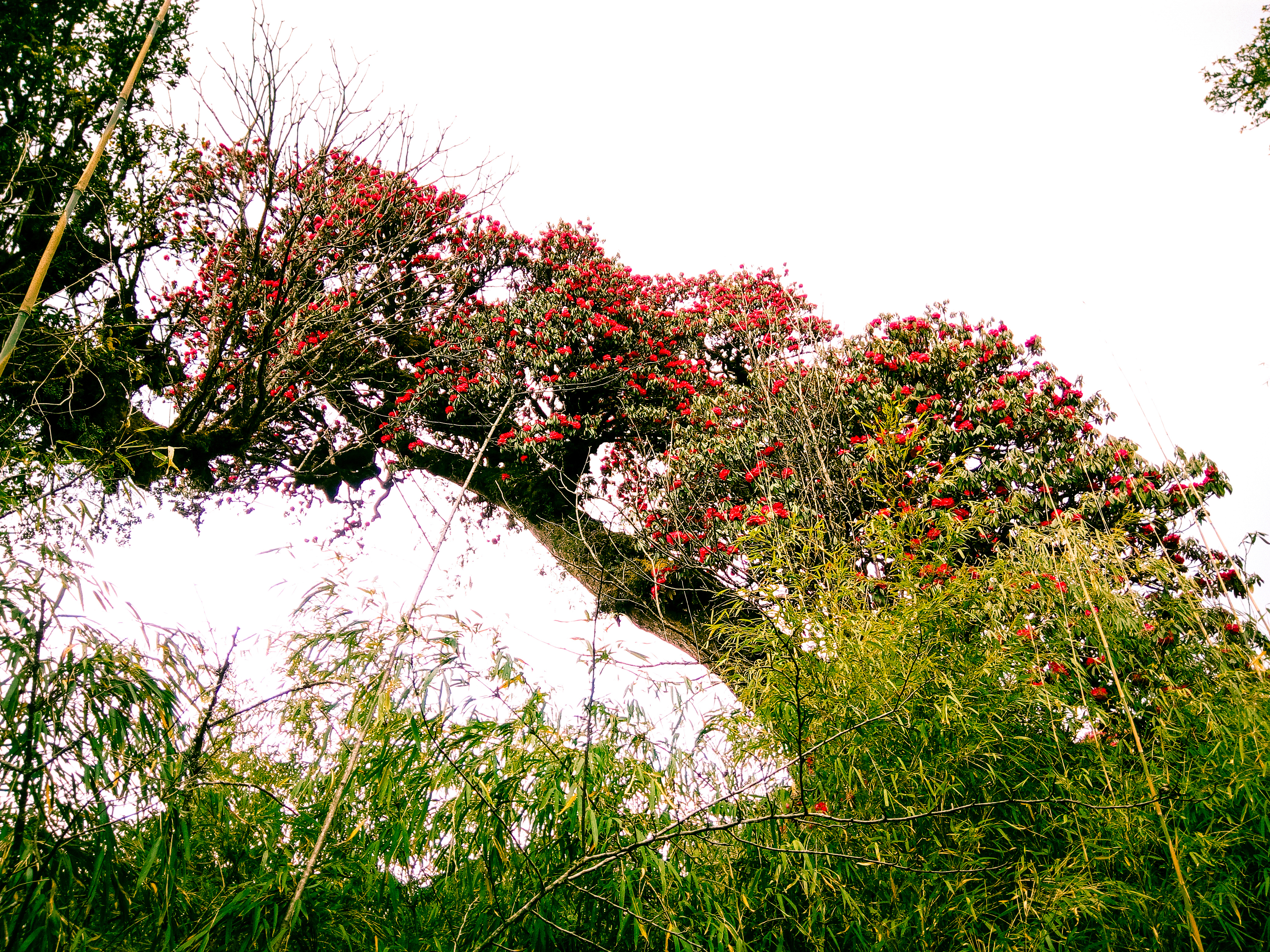
Rhododendron in Varsey Rhododendron Sanctuary

Wildlife Sanctuaries in Sikkim
Sanctuary	Declared	Area (km^{2})	District
Fambong Lho Wildlife Sanctuary	1984	51.76	East Sikkim
Kitam Bird Sanctuary	2005	6	Namchi
Kyongnosla Alpine Sanctuary	1977	31	East Sikkim
Maenam Wildlife Sanctuary	1987	35.34	South Sikkim
Pangolakha Wildlife Sanctuary	2002	128	East Sikkim
Shingba Rhododendron Sanctuary	1984	43	North Sikkim
Varsey Rhododendron Sanctuary	1998	104	West Sikkim

== Tamil Nadu ==
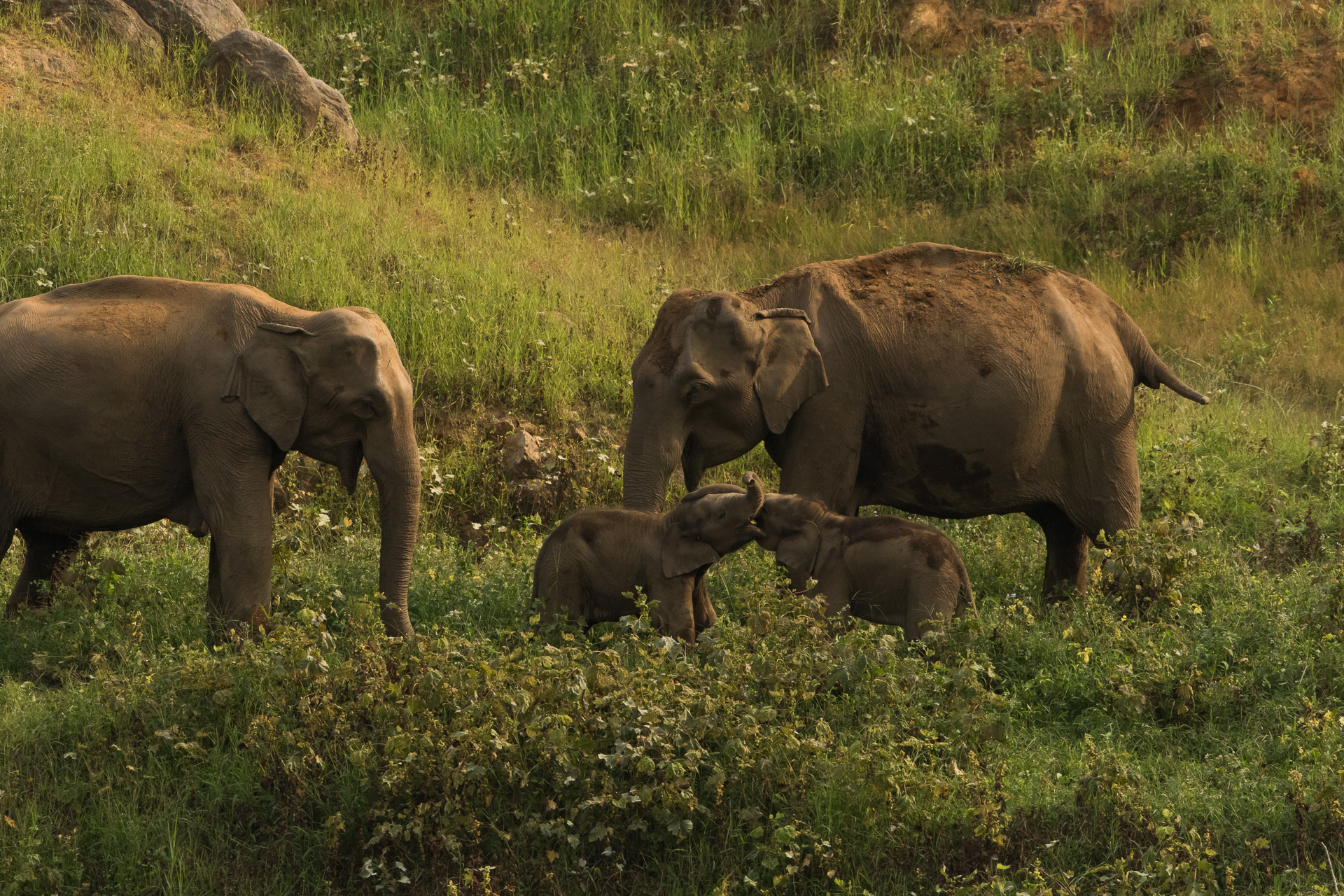
Indian elephants in Anamalai Wildlife Sanctuary

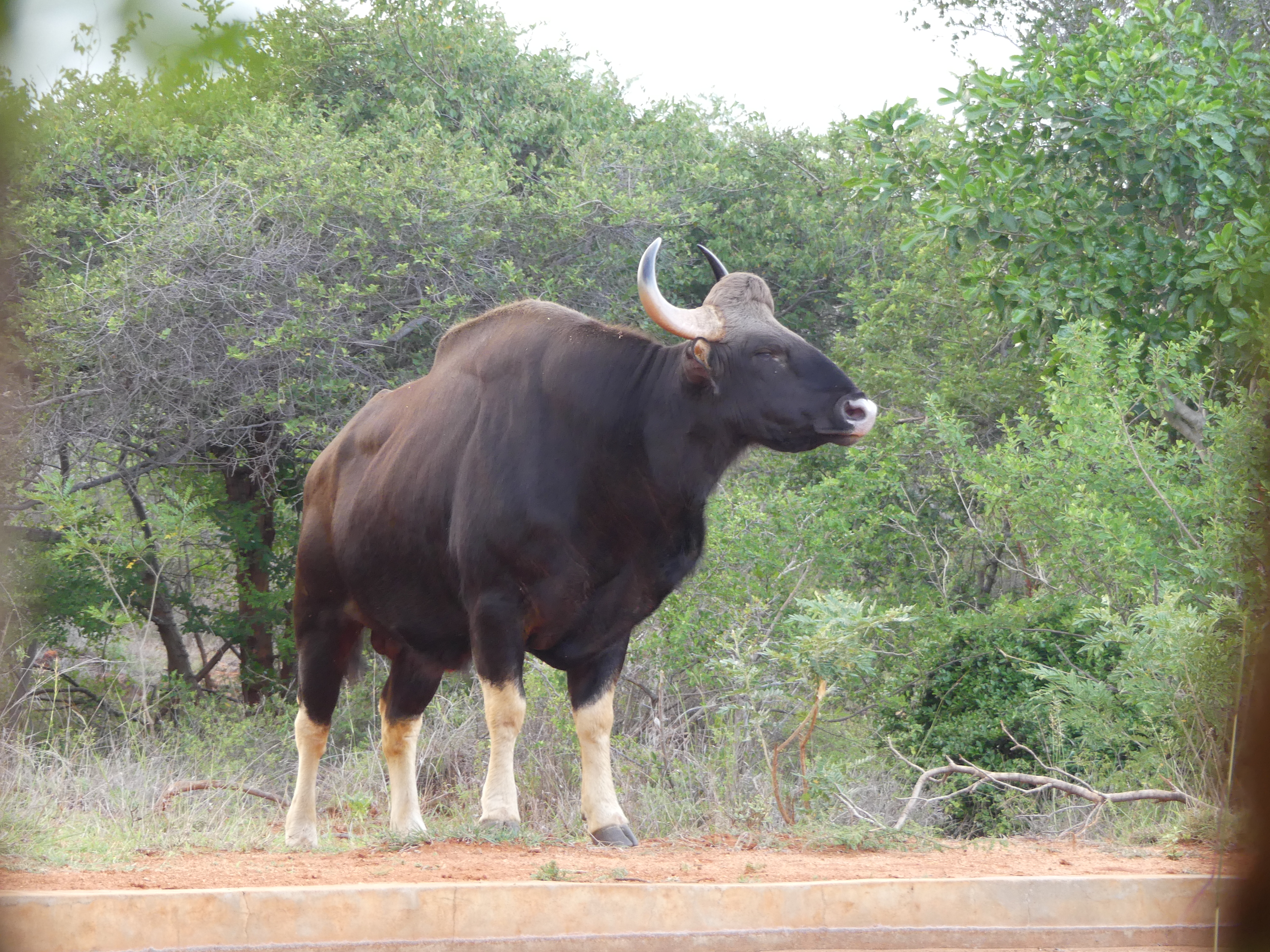
Indian gaur in Kalakkad Mundanthurai Tiger Reserve

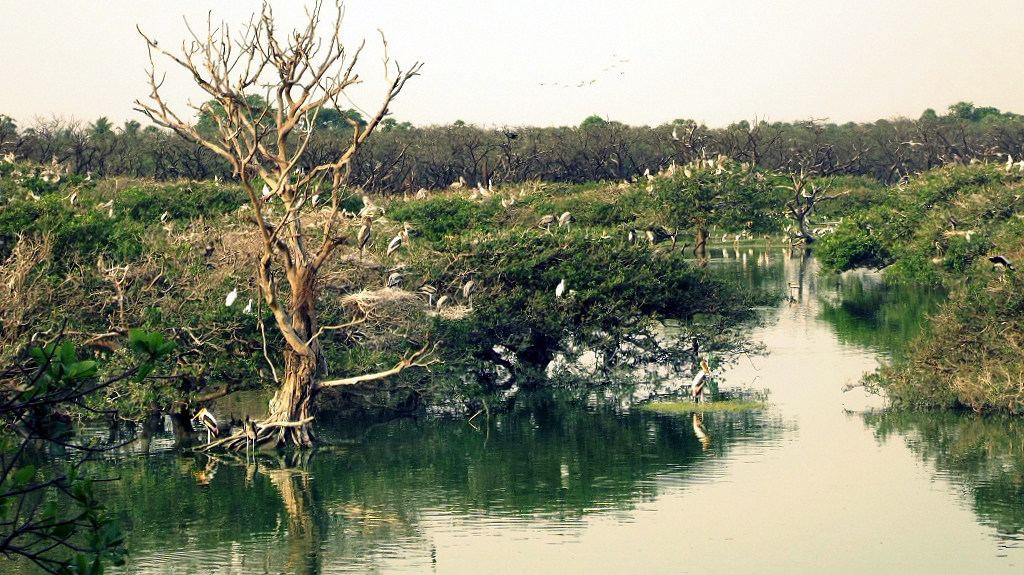
Vedanthangal Bird Sanctuary, India's first wildlife sanctuary

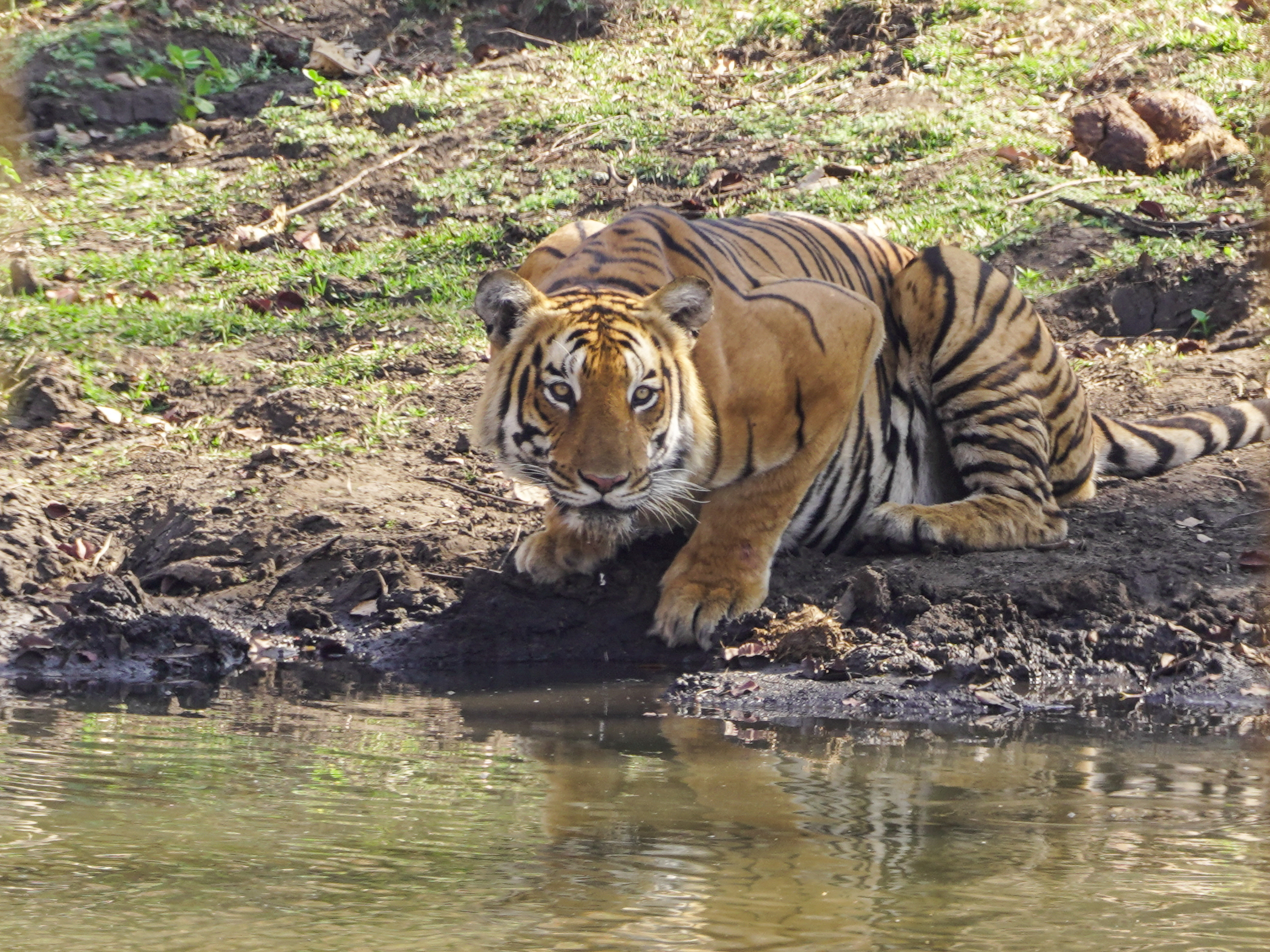
Bengal tiger in Mudumalai Wildlife Sanctuary

Wildlife Sanctuaries in Tamil Nadu
Sanctuary	Declared	Area (km^{2})	District
Anamalai Wildlife Sanctuary	1976	841.49	Coimbatore, Tiruppur
Cauvery North Wildlife Sanctuary	2014	504.33	Dharmapuri, Krishnagiri
Cauvery South Wildlife Sanctuary	2022	686.41	Dharmapuri, Krishnagiri
Chitrangudi Bird Sanctuary	1989	0.48	Ramanathapuram
Gangaikondan Spotted Deer Sanctuary	2013	2.88	Tirunelveli
Grizzled Squirrel Wildlife Sanctuary	1988	485.2	Virudhunagar
Kadavur Wildlife Sanctuary	2022	118.07	Dindigul, Karur
Kalakkad Wildlife Sanctuary	1976	223.58	Tirunelveli
Kallaperambur Lake Bird Sanctuary	2015	64	Thanjavur
Kanjirankulam Bird Sanctuary	1989	1.04	Ramanathapuram
Kanyakumari Wildlife Sanctuary	2007	402.4	Kanyakumari
Karaivetti Bird Sanctuary	1999	4.54	Perambalur
Karikili Bird Sanctuary	1989	0.61	Kanchipuram
Kazhuveli Bird Sanctuary	2021	51.52	Villupuram
Kodaikanal Wildlife Sanctuary	2008	608.95	Dindigul, Theni
Koonthankulam Bird Sanctuary	1994	1.29	Tirunelveli
Megamalai Wildlife Sanctuary	2009	269.11	Madurai, Theni
Melaselvanur-Kilaselvanur Bird Sanctuary	2010	5.93	Ramanathapuram
Mudumalai Wildlife Sanctuary	1940	217.76	Nilgiris
Mundanthurai Wildlife Sanctuary	1962	582.08	Tirunelveli
Nanjarayan Tank Bird Sanctuary	2022	1.26	Tiruppur
Nellai Wildlife Sanctuary	2014	356.73	Tirunelveli
Point Calimere Wildlife and Bird Sanctuary	1967	141.36	Nagapattinam, Thanjavur, Thiruvarur
Pulicat Lake Bird Sanctuary	1980	153.67	Tiruvallur
Sakkarakottai Bird Sanctuary	2012	2.3	Ramanathapuram
Sathyamangalam Wildlife Sanctuary	2008	1,411.61	Erode
Thanthai Periyar Wildlife Sanctuary	2023	805.67	Erode
Therthangal Bird Sanctuary	2010	0.29	Ramanathapuram
Udayamarthandapuram Bird Sanctuary	1998	0.45	Thiruvarur
Vaduvoor Bird Sanctuary	1991	1.28	Thiruvarur
Vedanthangal Bird Sanctuary	1936	0.3	Chengalpattu
Vallanadu Wildlife Sanctuary	1987	16.41	Thoothukudi
Vellode Bird Sanctuary	2000	0.77	Erode
Vettangudi Bird Sanctuary	1977	0.38	Sivagangai

== Telangana ==
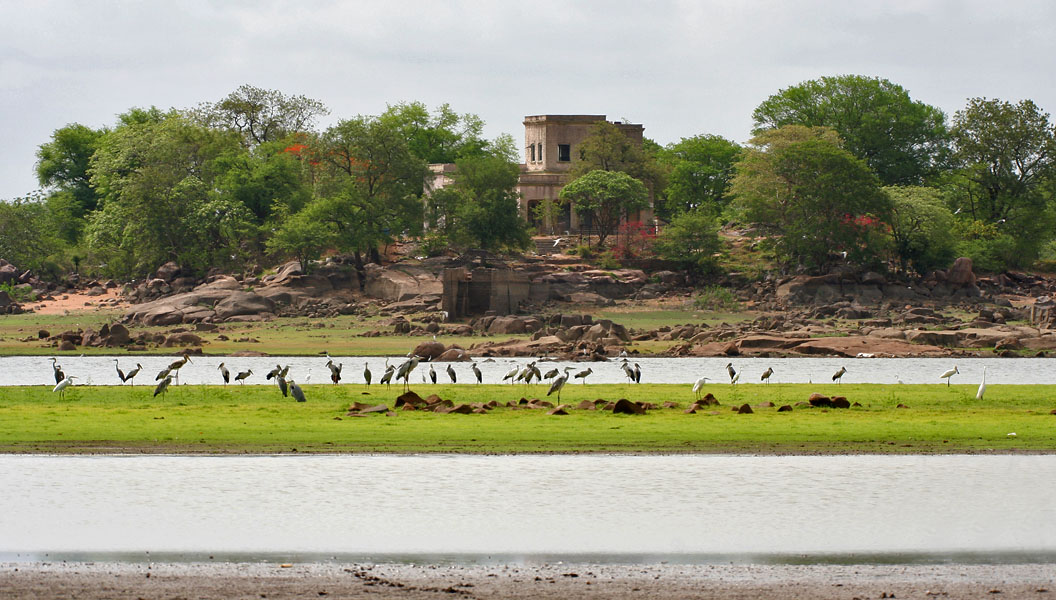
Birds in Pocharam Wildlife Sanctuary

Wildlife Sanctuaries in Telangana
Sanctuary	Declared	Area (km^{2})	District
Eturnagaram Wildlife Sanctuary	1953	803	Karimnagar, Warangal
Kawal Wildlife Sanctuary	1965	892.23	Adilabad
Kinnerasani Wildlife Sanctuary	1977	635.41	Khammam
Manjira Wildlife Sanctuary	1978	20	Medak
Nagarjunsagar-Srisailam Tiger Reserve	1978	2166.37	Mahabub Nagar, Nalgonda
Pakhal Wildlife Sanctuary	1952	860	Warangal
Pocharam Wildlife Sanctuary	1952	129.84	Medak, Nizamabad
Pranahita Wildlife Sanctuary	1980	136.03	Adilabad
Shivaram Wildlife Sanctuary	1978	29.81	Adilabad, Karimnagar

== Tripura ==
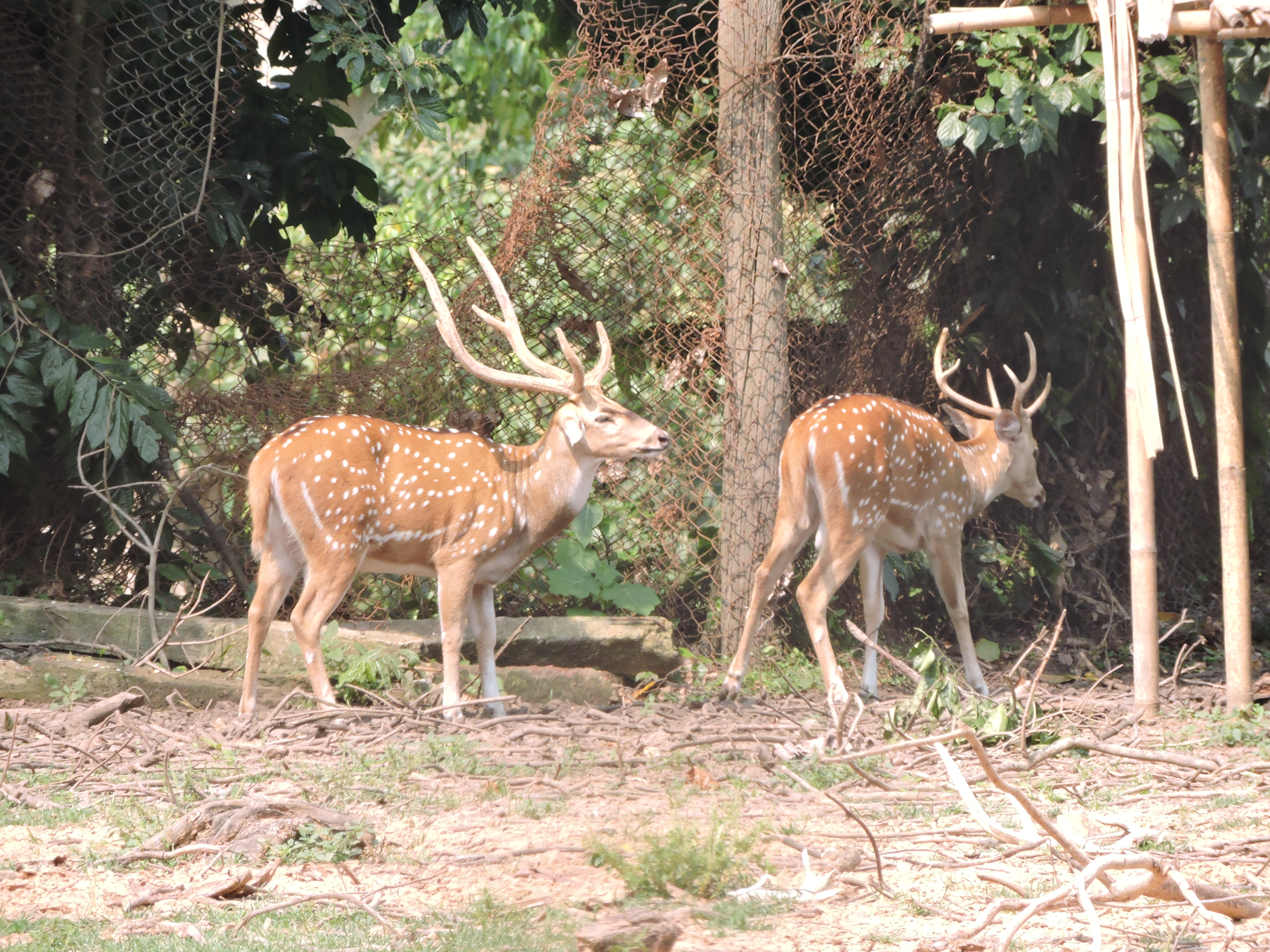
Chital in Sepahijala Sanctuary

Wildlife Sanctuaries in Tripura
Sanctuary	Declared	Area (km^{2})	District
Gumti Wildlife Sanctuary	1988	389.54	South Tripura
Rowa Wildlife Sanctuary	1988	0.86	North Tripura
Sepahijala Wildlife Sanctuary	1987	18.53	West Tripura
Trishna Wildlife Sanctuary	1988	194.71	South Tripura

== Uttar Pradesh ==
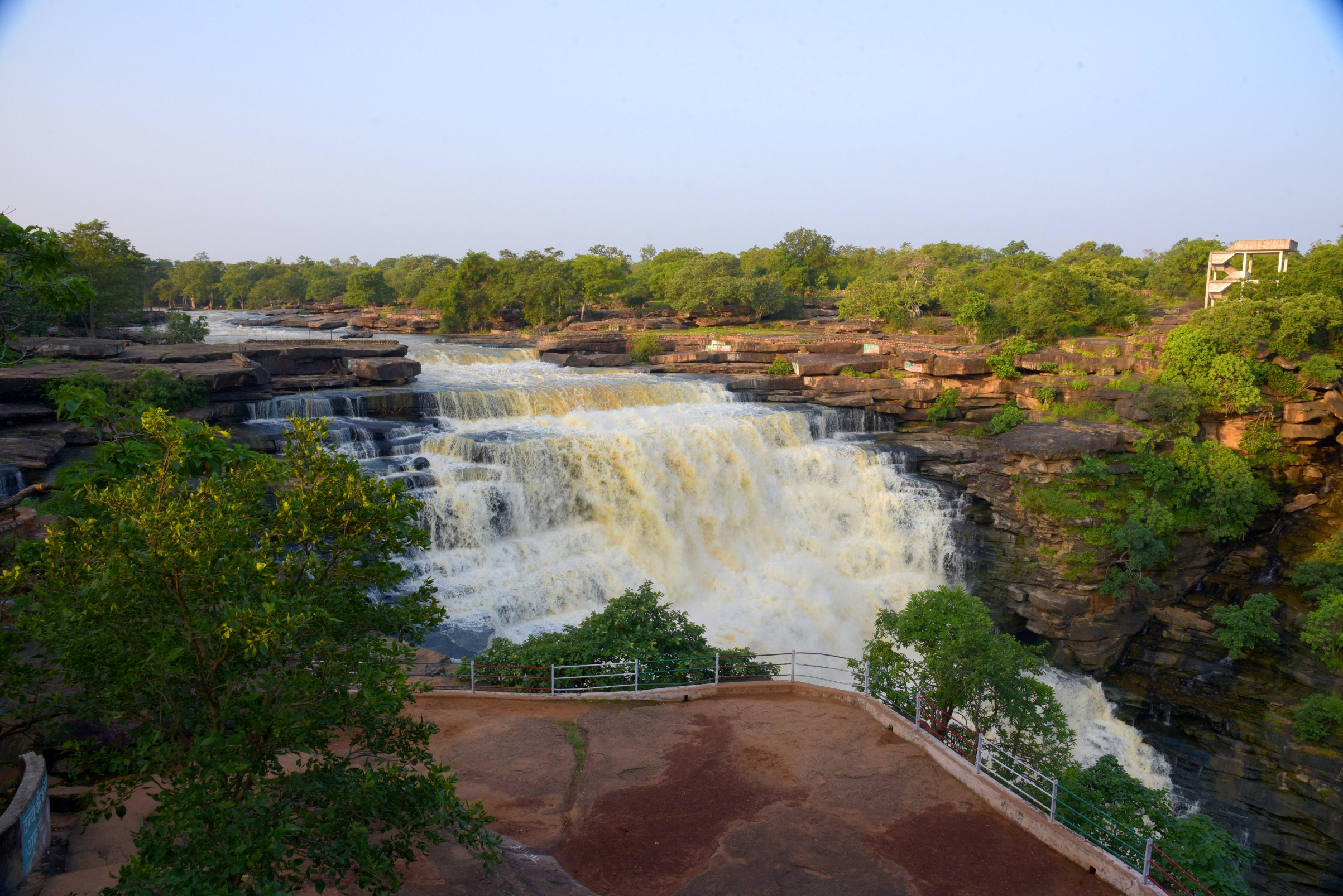
A waterfall in Chandra Prabha Wildlife Sanctuary

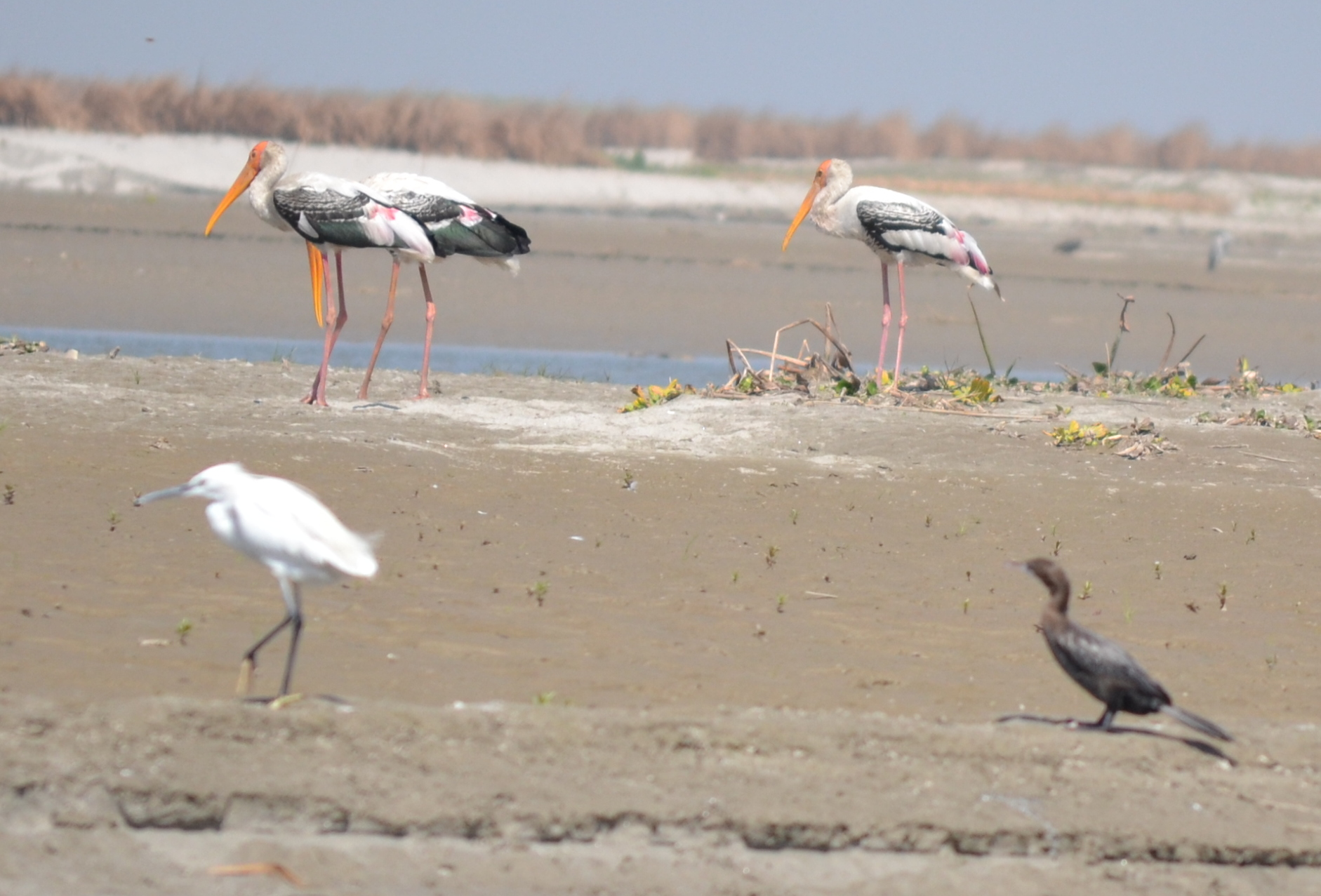
Birds in Hastinapur Wildlife Sanctuary

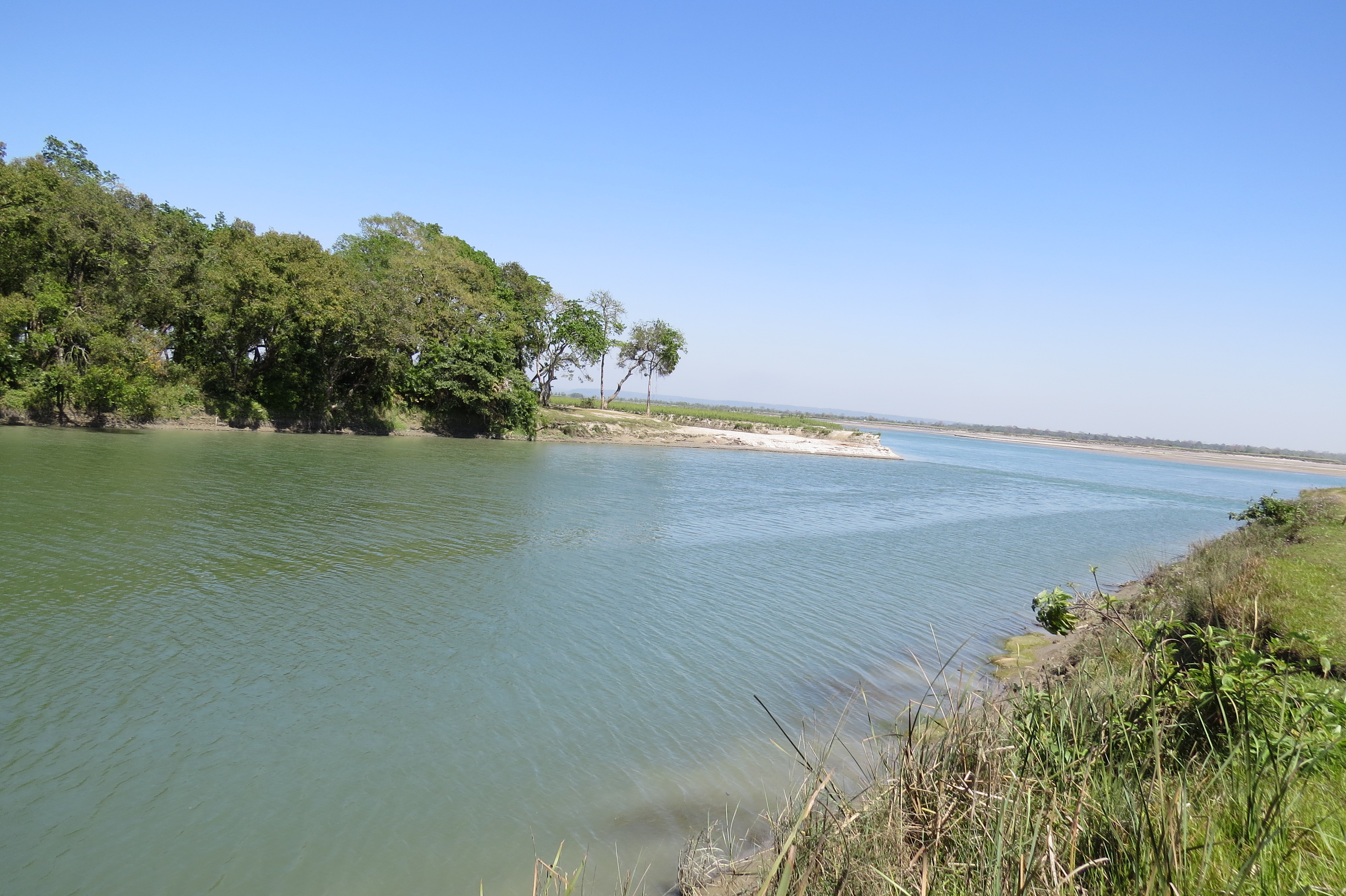
Gandaki River in Sohagi Barwa Wildlife Sanctuary

Wildlife Sanctuaries in Uttar Pradesh
Sanctuary	Declared	Area (km^{2})	District
Bakhira Wildlife Sanctuary	1990	28.94	Sant Kabir Nagar
Chandra Prabha Wildlife Sanctuary	1957	78	Chandauli
Dr. Bhimrao Ambedkar Bird Sanctuary	2003	4.27	Raebareli
Hastinapur Wildlife Sanctuary	1986	2073	Bijnore, Ghaziabad, Jyotiba Nagar, Meerut, Muzaffarnagar
Kachhua Wildlife Sanctuary	1989	7	Varanasi
Kaimoor Wildlife Sanctuary	1982	500.73	Mirzapur, Sonbhadra
Katarniaghat Wildlife Sanctuary	1976	400.09	Bahraich
Kishanpur Wildlife Sanctuary	1972	227	Lakhimpur-Kheri, Shahjahanpur
Lakh Bahosi Wildlife Sanctuary	1988	80.24	Farrukhabad
Mahavir Swami Wildlife Sanctuary	1977	5.41	Lalitpur
National Chambal Wildlife Sanctuary	1979	635	Agra, Etawah
Nawabganj Bird Sanctuary	1984	2.25	Unnao, Lucknow
Okhla Wildlife Sanctuary	1990	4	Gautam Buddh Nagar
Parvati Arga Wildlife Sanctuary	1990	10.84	Gonda
Patna Bird Sanctuary	1990	1.09	Etah
Pilibhit Wildlife Sanctuary	2014	730.24	Pilibhit
Ranipur Wildlife Sanctuary	1977	230.31	Banda, Chitrakoot
Saman Bird Sanctuary	1990	5.26	Mainpuri
Samaspur Bird Sanctuary	1987	7.99	Rae Bareli
Sandi Bird Sanctuary	1990	3.09	Hardoi
Shekha Bird Sanctuary	2016	0.25	Aligarh
Sohagi Barwa Wildlife Sanctuary	1987	428.2	Maharajganj
Sohelwa Wildlife Sanctuary	1988	452.47	Balrampur, Shravasti
Sur Sarovar Bird Sanctuary	1991	4.03	Agra
Surha Tal Bird Sanctuary	1991	34.32	Ballia
Vijai Sagar Wildlife Sanctuary	1990	2.62	Mahoba

== Uttarakhand ==
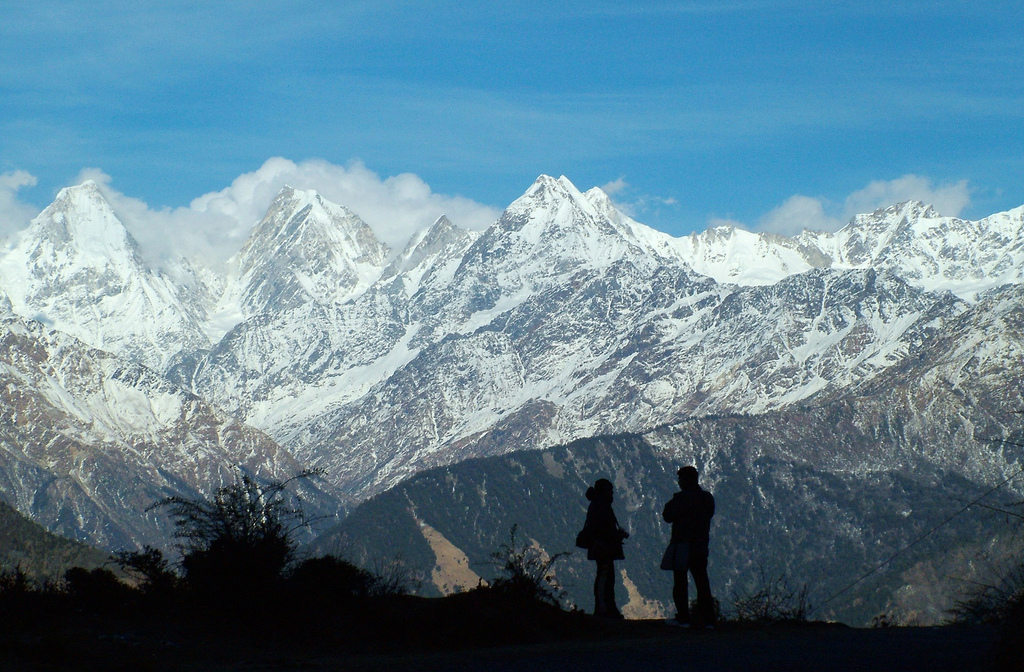
Himalayan peaks visible from Askot Musk Deer Sanctuary

Wildlife Sanctuaries in Uttarakhand
Sanctuary	Declared	Area (km^{2})	District
Askot Musk Deer Sanctuary	1986	600	Pithoragarh
Binsar Wildlife Sanctuary	1988	47.07	Almora
Govind Pashu Vihar Wildlife Sanctuary	1955	485.89	Uttarkashi
Kedarnath Wildlife Sanctuary	1972	975.2	Chamoli, Rudraprayag
Mussoorie Wildlife Sanctuary	1993	10.82	Dehradun
Nandhaur Wildlife Sanctuary	2012	269.96	Champawat, Nainital
Sonanadi Wildlife Sanctuary	1987	301.18	Pauri Garhwal

== West Bengal ==
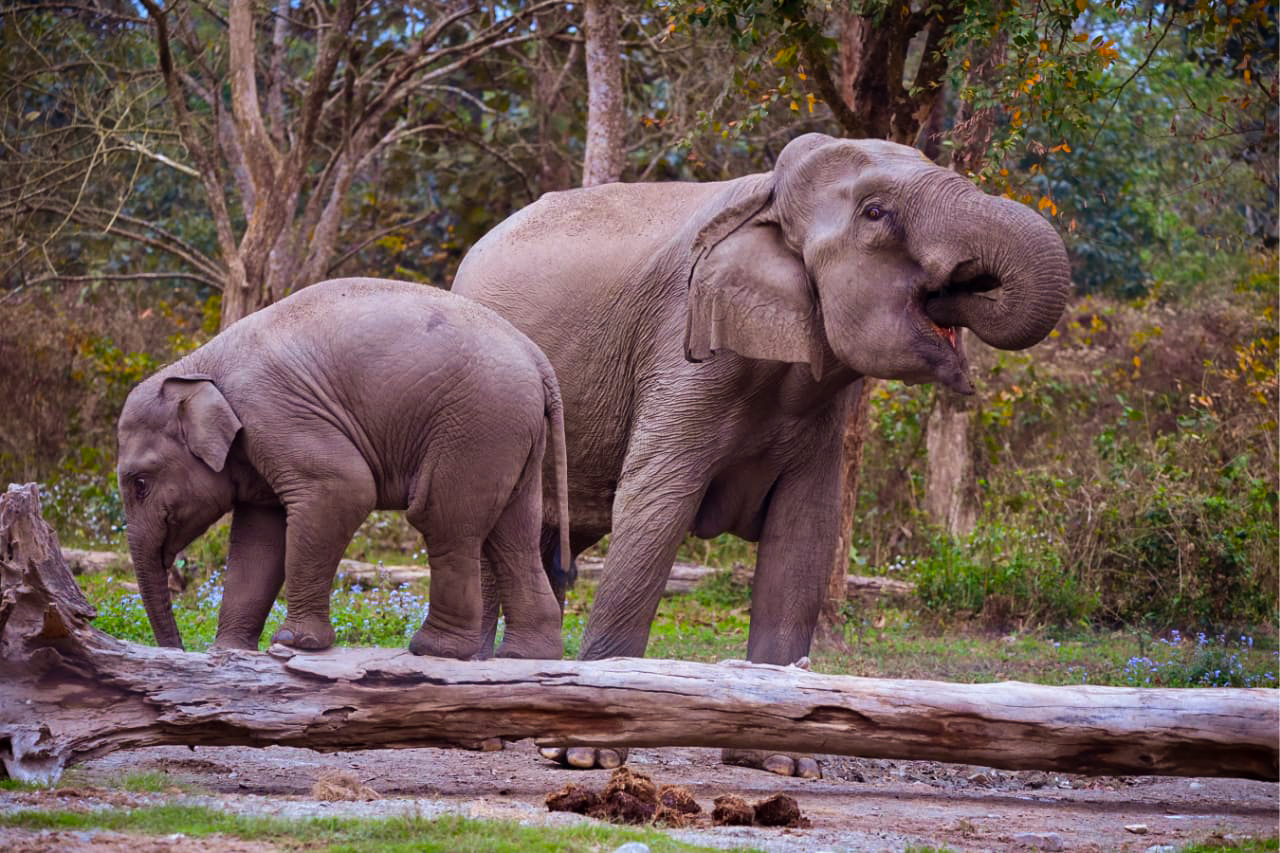
Indian elephants in Buxa Tiger Reserve

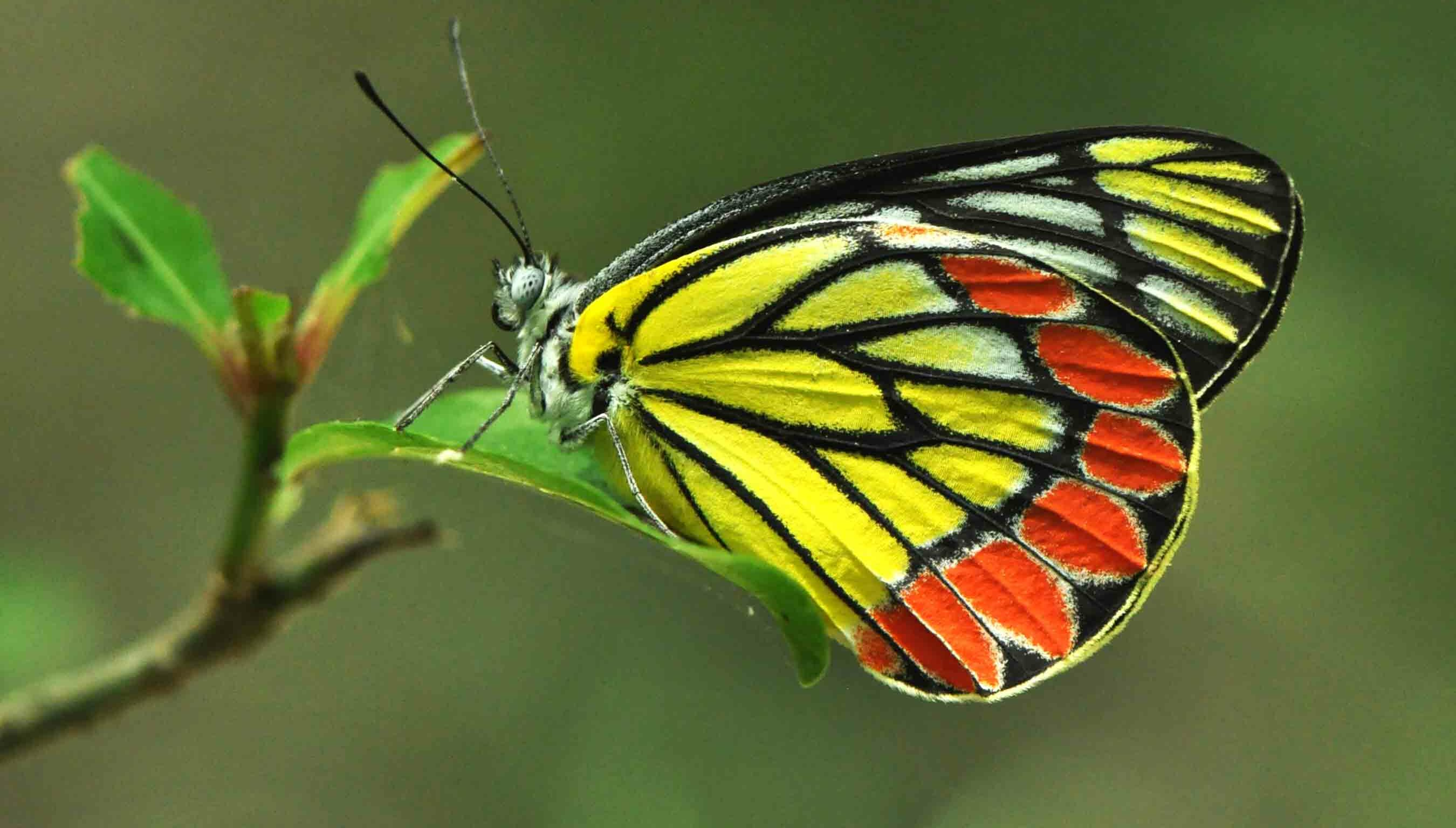
Common jezebel in Raiganj Wildlife Sanctuary

Wildlife Sanctuaries in West Bengal
Sanctuary	Declared	Area (km^{2})	District
Ballabhpur Wildlife Sanctuary	1977	2.02	Birbhum
Bethuadahari Wildlife Sanctuary	1980	0.67	Nadia
Bibhutibhushan Wildlife Sanctuary	1985	0.64	North 24-Paraganas
Buxa Wildlife Sanctuary	1986	251.89	Jalpaiguri
Chapramari Wildlife Sanctuary	1976	9.6	Jalpaiguri
Chintamoni Kar Wildlife Sanctuary	1982	0.07	South 24 Parganas
Haliday Island Wildlife Sanctuary	1976	5.95	South 24-Paraganas
Jore Pokhri Wildlife Sanctuary	1985	0.04	Darjeeling
Lothian Island Wildlife Sanctuary	1976	38	South 24-Paraganas
Mahananda Wildlife Sanctuary	1976	158.04	Darjeeling
Pakhibitan Wildlife Sanctuary	2011	14.09	Jalpaiguri
Raiganj Wildlife Sanctuary	1985	1.3	North Dinajpur
Ramnabagan Wildlife Sanctuary	1981	0.15	Burdwan
Sajnakhali Wildlife Sanctuary	1976	362.4	South 24-Paraganas
Senchal Wildlife Sanctuary	1976	38.88	Darjeeling
West Sunderban Wildlife Sanctuary	2013	556.45	South 24-Paraganas

== See also ==
- List of national parks of India
- List of botanical gardens in India
- Elephant reserves
- Tiger reserves of India
