= Eastern Highlands moist deciduous forests =

Ecoregion of India

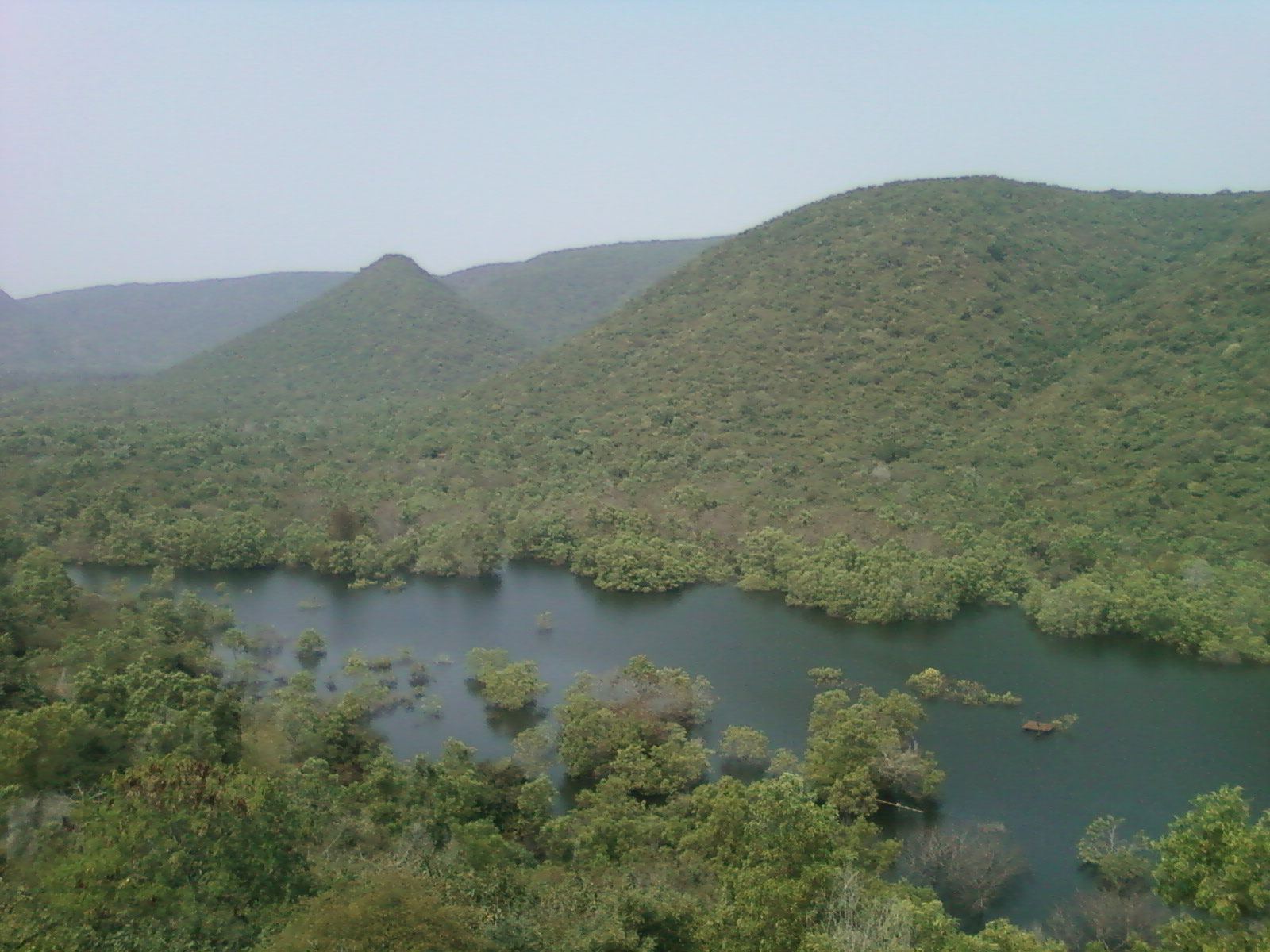
- Tropical moist deciduous forest in Kambalakonda Wildlife Sanctuary, Andhra Pradesh

- Location of the ecoregion

Ecology
- Realm: Indomalayan
- Biome: tropical and subtropical moist broadleaf forests
- Borders: List: Central Deccan Plateau dry deciduous forests; Chhota-Nagpur dry deciduous forests; Godavari-Krishna mangroves; Lower Gangetic Plains moist deciduous forests; Narmada Valley dry deciduous forests; North Deccan dry deciduous forests; Odisha semi-evergreen forests
- Bird species: 313

Geography
- Area: 341,100 km^{2} (131,700 sq mi)
- Country: India
- States: Andhra Pradesh; Chhattisgarh; Jharkhand; Madhya Pradesh; Maharashtra; Odisha; Telangana
- Coordinates: 19°12′N 80°30′E

Conservation
- Conservation status: Critical/endangered
- Protected: 3.97%

The Eastern Highlands moist deciduous forests, presently known as East Deccan moist deciduous forests, is a tropical and subtropical moist broadleaf forests ecoregion in east-central India. The ecoregion covers an area of 341,100 square kilometers (131,700 sq mi), extending across portions of Andhra Pradesh, Chhattisgarh, Jharkhand, Madhya Pradesh, Maharashtra, Odisha, and Telangana states.

== Setting ==
The Eastern Highlands moist deciduous forests extend from the Bay of Bengal coast in northern Andhra Pradesh and southern Odisha, across the northern portion of the Eastern Ghats range and the northeastern Deccan Plateau, to the eastern Satpura Range and the upper Narmada River valley.

The forests of the ecoregion are sustained by the moisture-bearing monsoon winds from the Bay of Bengal. The ecoregion is bounded on the north and west by tropical dry deciduous forest ecoregions, including the Central Deccan Plateau dry deciduous forests to the southwest and west, the Narmada valley dry deciduous forests to the northwest, and the Chota Nagpur dry deciduous forests to the north and northeast. The drier Northern dry deciduous forests ecoregion, lying west of the Eastern Ghats range, is completely surrounded by the Eastern Highlands moist deciduous forests, in the rain shadow of the Ghats, which partially block the moisture-laden monsoon winds off the Bay of Bengal. The humid Orissa semi-evergreen forests ecoregion lies to the northeast in the coastal lowlands of Orissa.

== Flora ==
The ecoregion's forests are dominated by Sal (Shorea robusta), in association with Terminalia, Adina, Toona, Syzygium, Buchanania, Cleistanthus, and Anogeissus, according to soil variations. The flora of the ecoregion shares many species with the moist forests of the Western Ghats and the Eastern Himalayas.

From the Western Ghats this includes plants like jackfruit and several hu lianas such as Schefflera vine (Heptapleurum venulosum), joint fir (Gnetum edule), and common rattan.

From the Eastern Himalayas this includes the peculiar Indian pepper tree and several shrubs, herbs and flowers such as yellow Himalayan raspberry, false nettle (Boehmeria macrophylla), and whipcord cobra lily among others.

Several globally threatened plant species are found in this ecoregion, including the two endemic plants Leucas mukerjiana and Phlebophyllum jeyporensis.

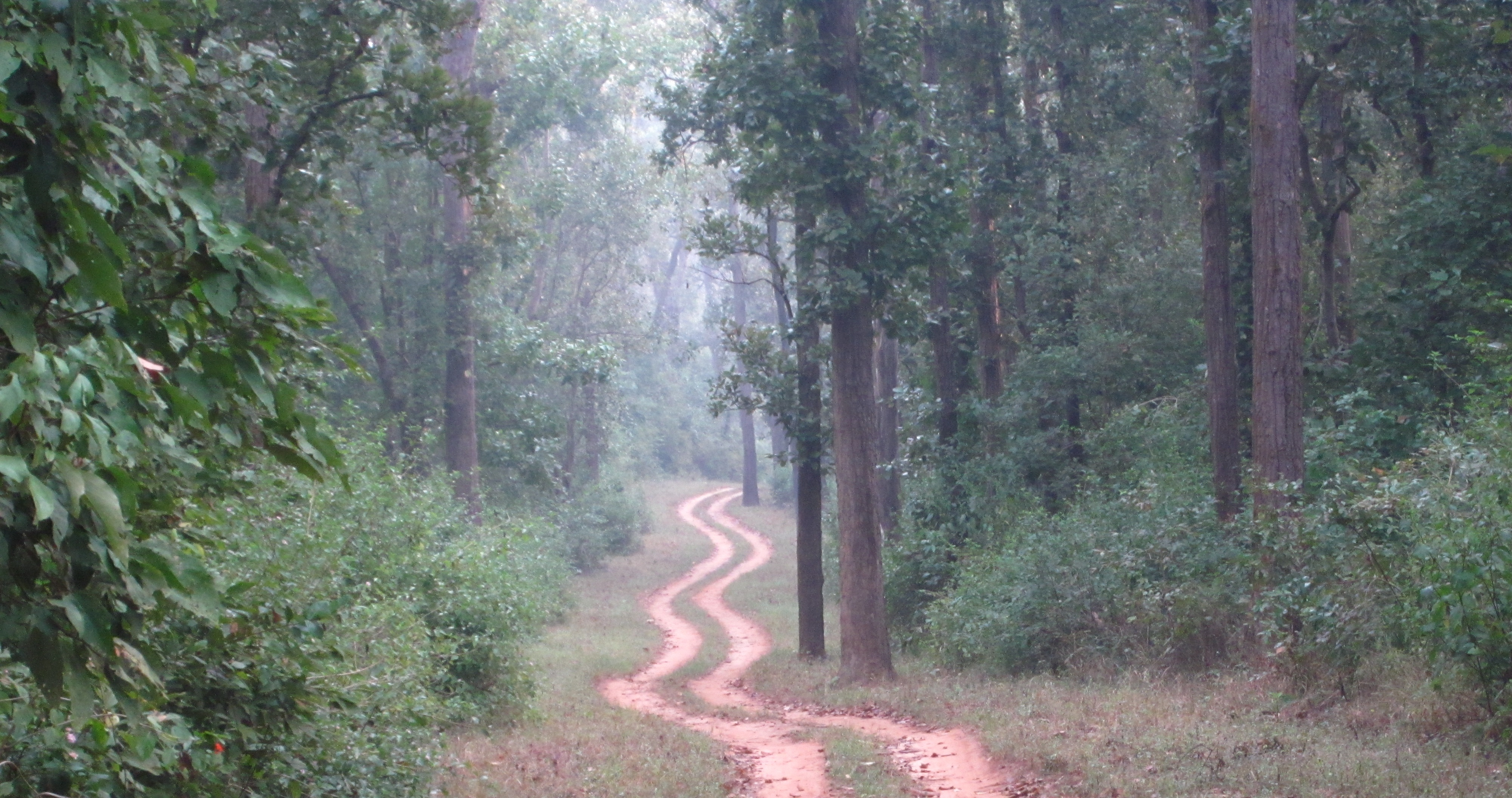
Inside a tropical moist deciduous forest

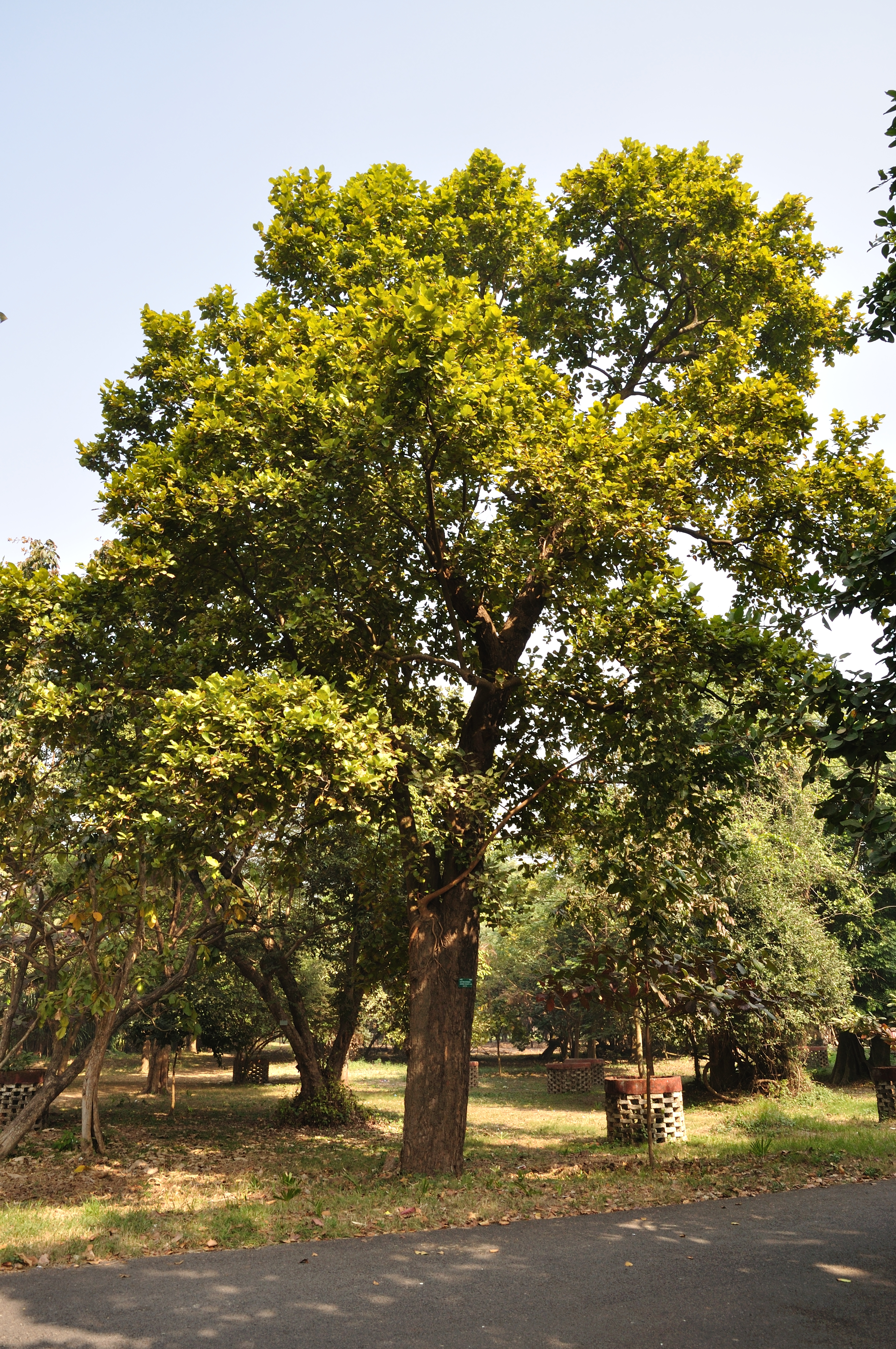
Sal trees are common in these forests

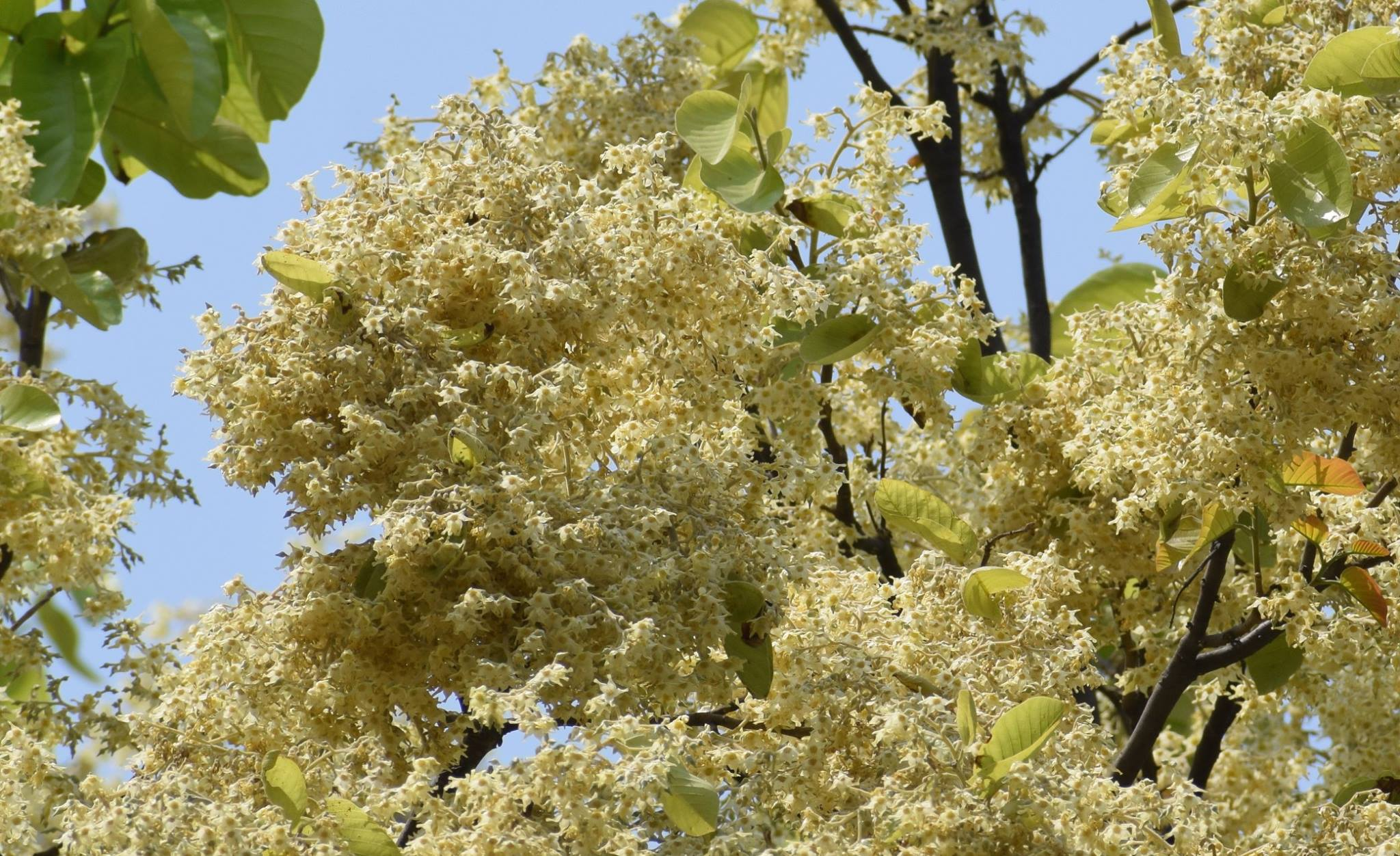
Characteristic yellow-white sal-flowers in winter coincides with leaffall

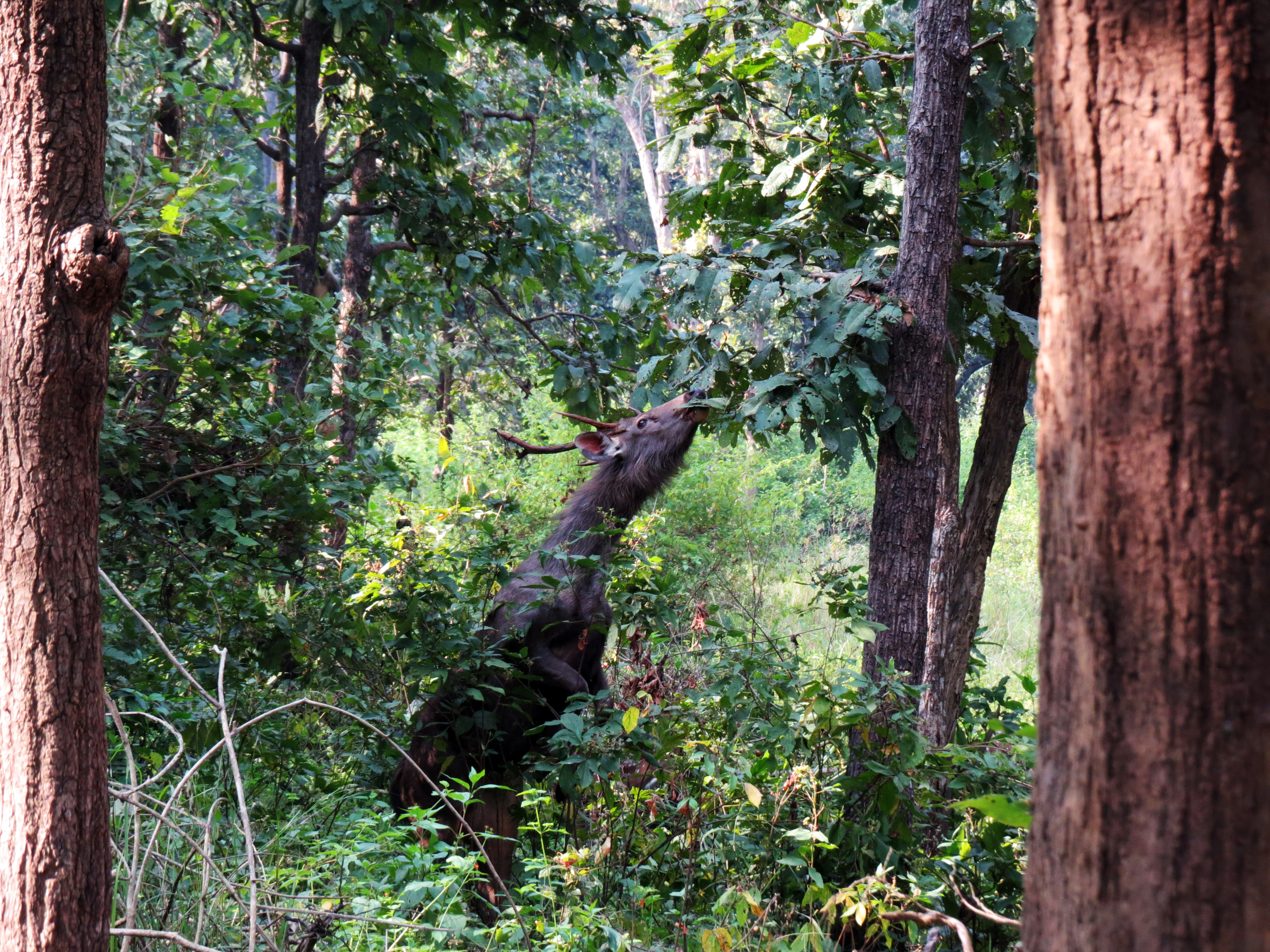
Terminalia, and especially asna trees (Indian laurel), are also common.

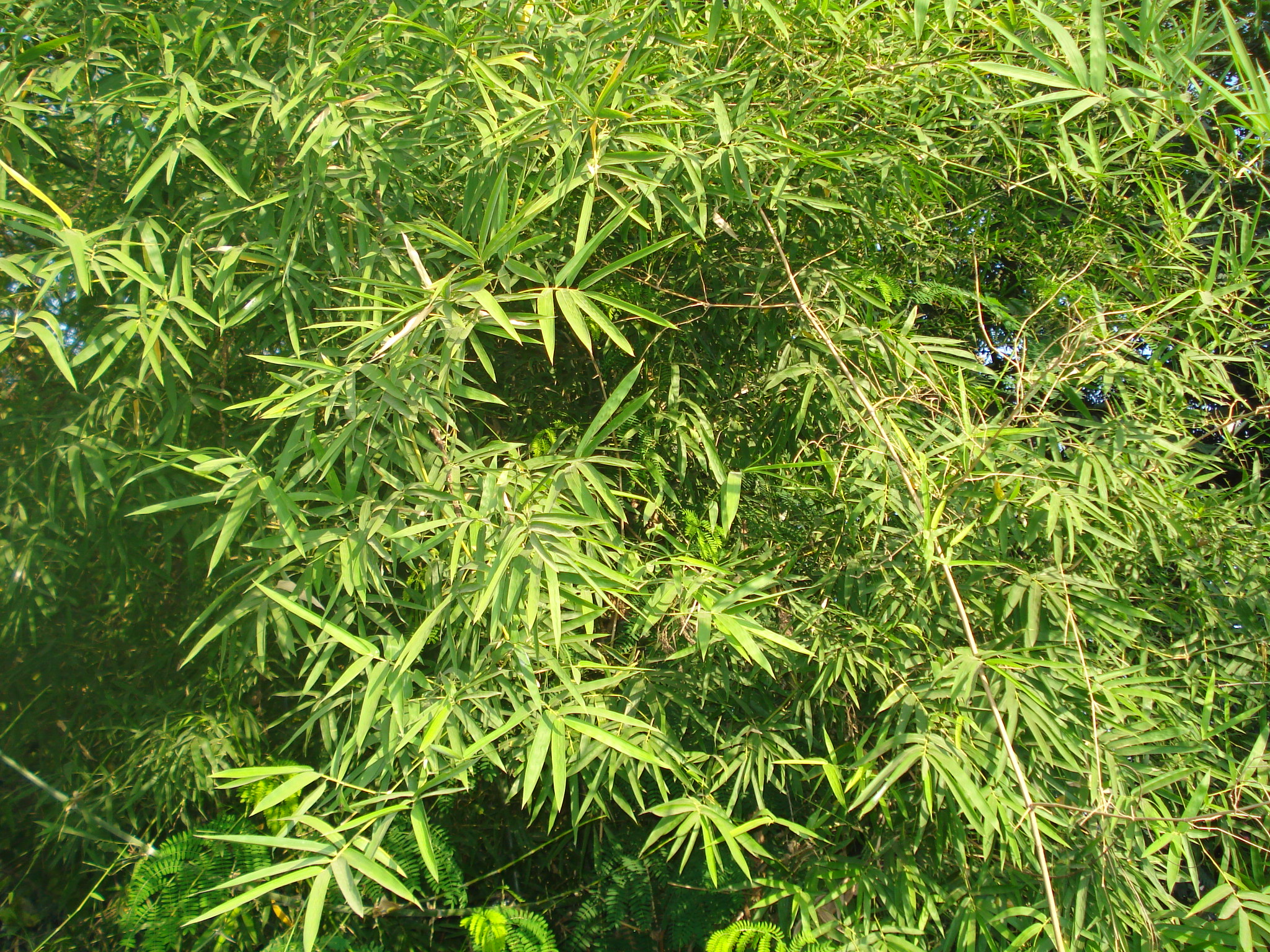
Bamboo, especially calcutta bamboo, is prominent in many parts of this ecoregion

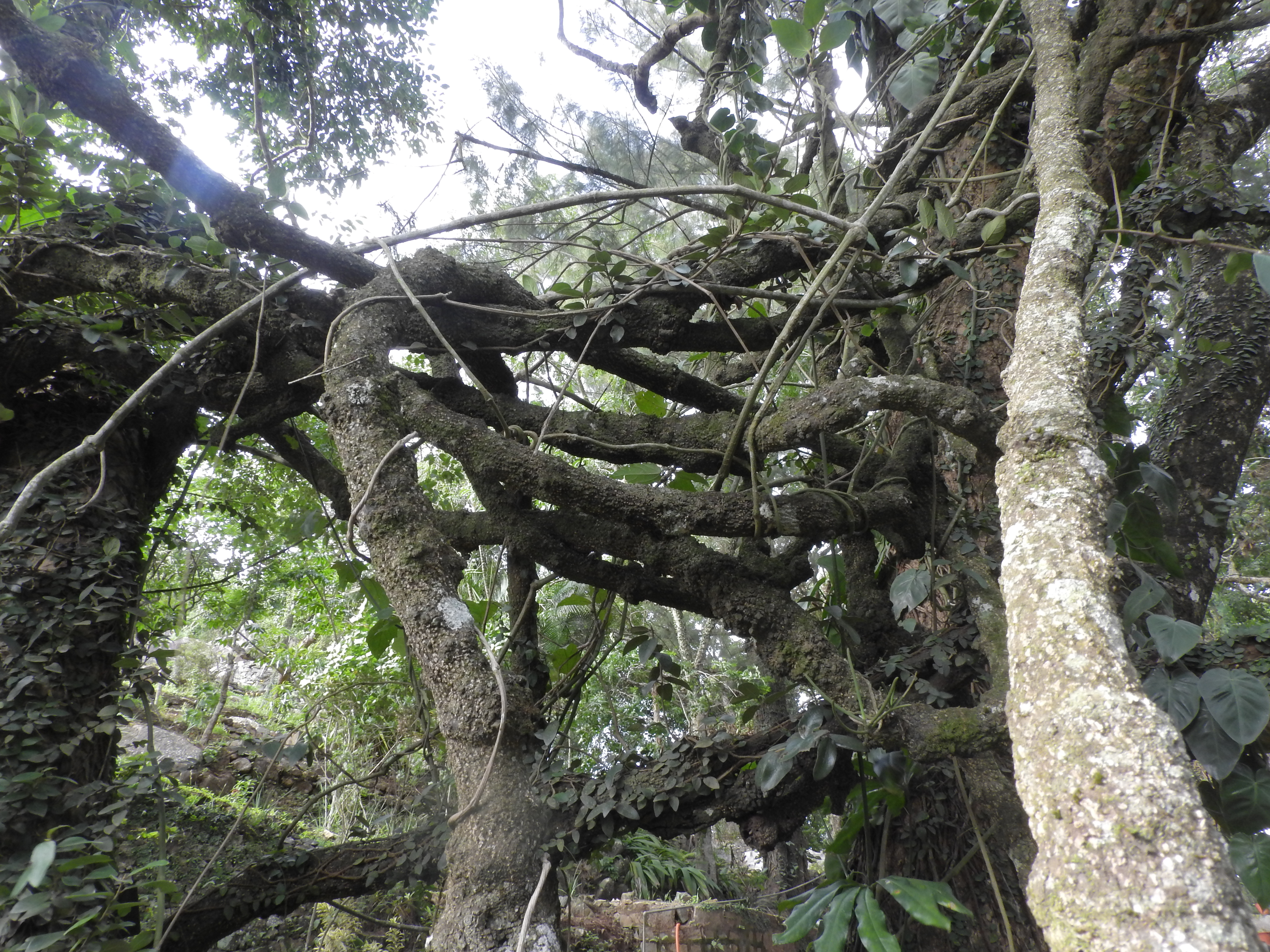
Plants in common with the Western Ghats includes several types of lianas (Joint Fir).

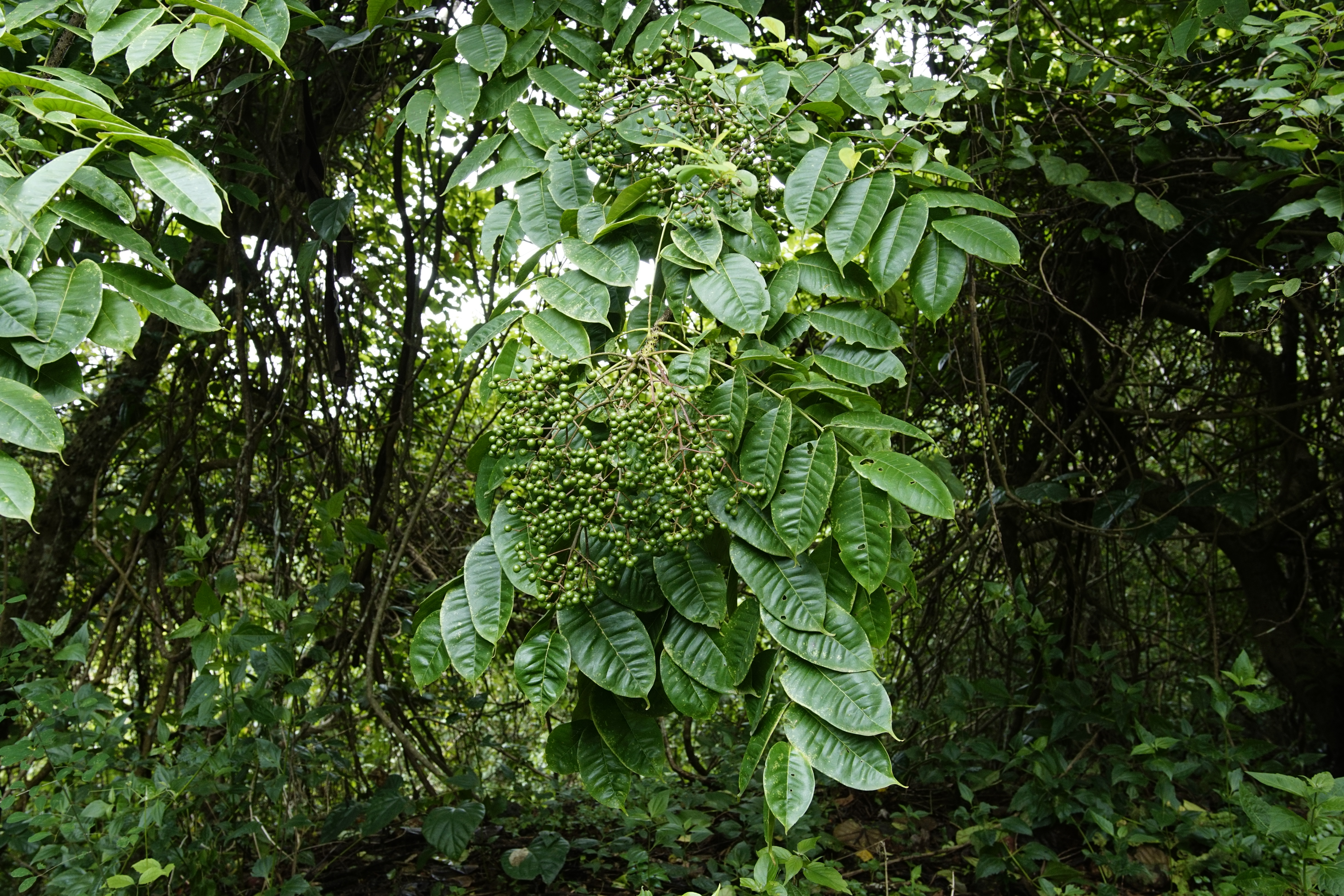
Plants in common with the Eastern Himalayas spans a wide range of species (Indian pepper tree)

== Fauna ==
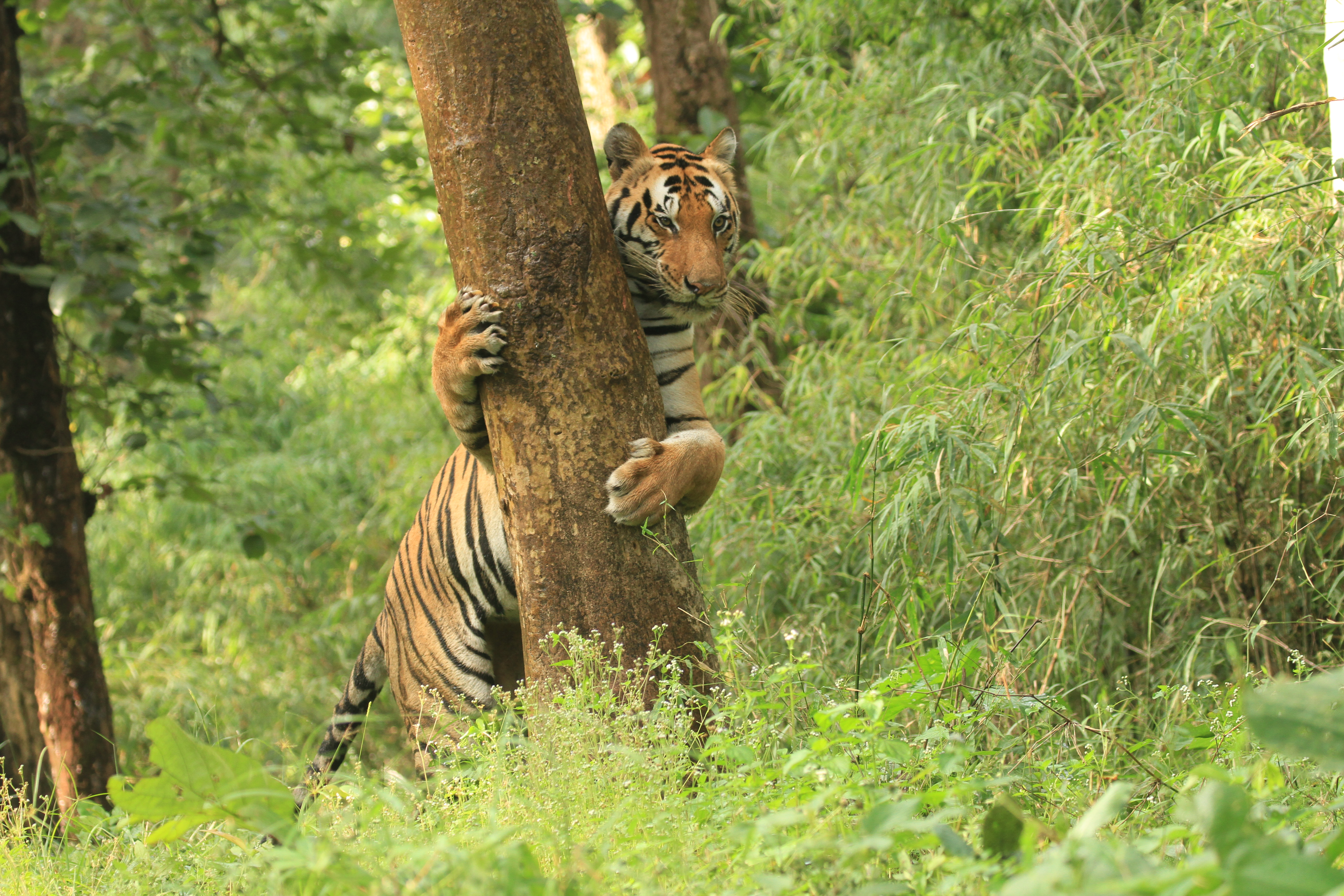
Tiger in Kanha National Park

The ecoregion still harbours large intact areas of tropical moist deciduous forest and is an important refuge for healthy populations of most of the original large vertebrates associated with this habitat. Large mammals include the predators Indian tiger, wolf, dhole, and sloth bear, and the herbivores gaur, chousingha, blackbuck, and chinkara. The Asian elephants that once lived were extirpated long ago.

The only endemic species found in the ecoregion is the cave-dwelling Khajuria's leaf-nosed bat.

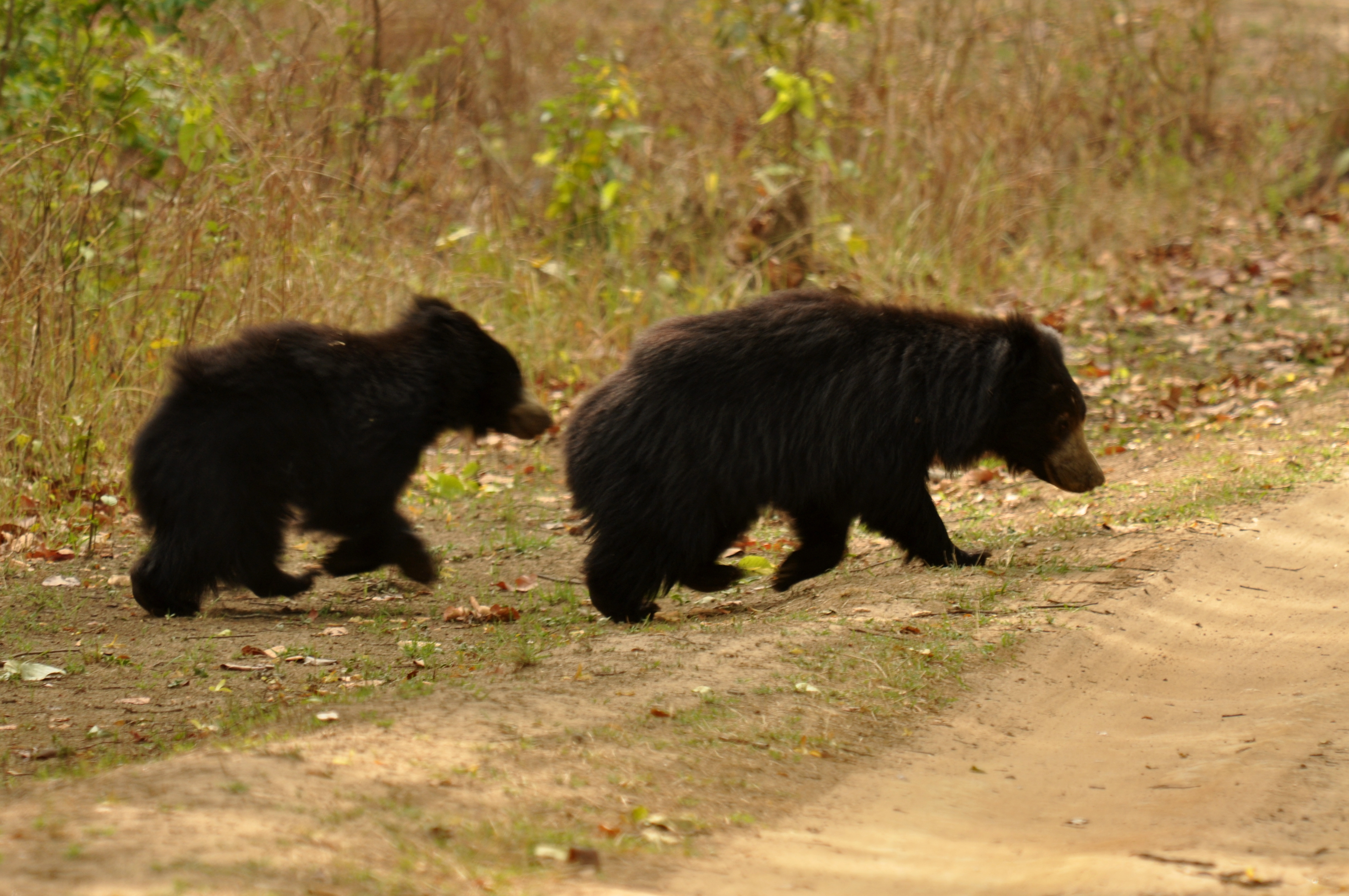
Sloth bears are here

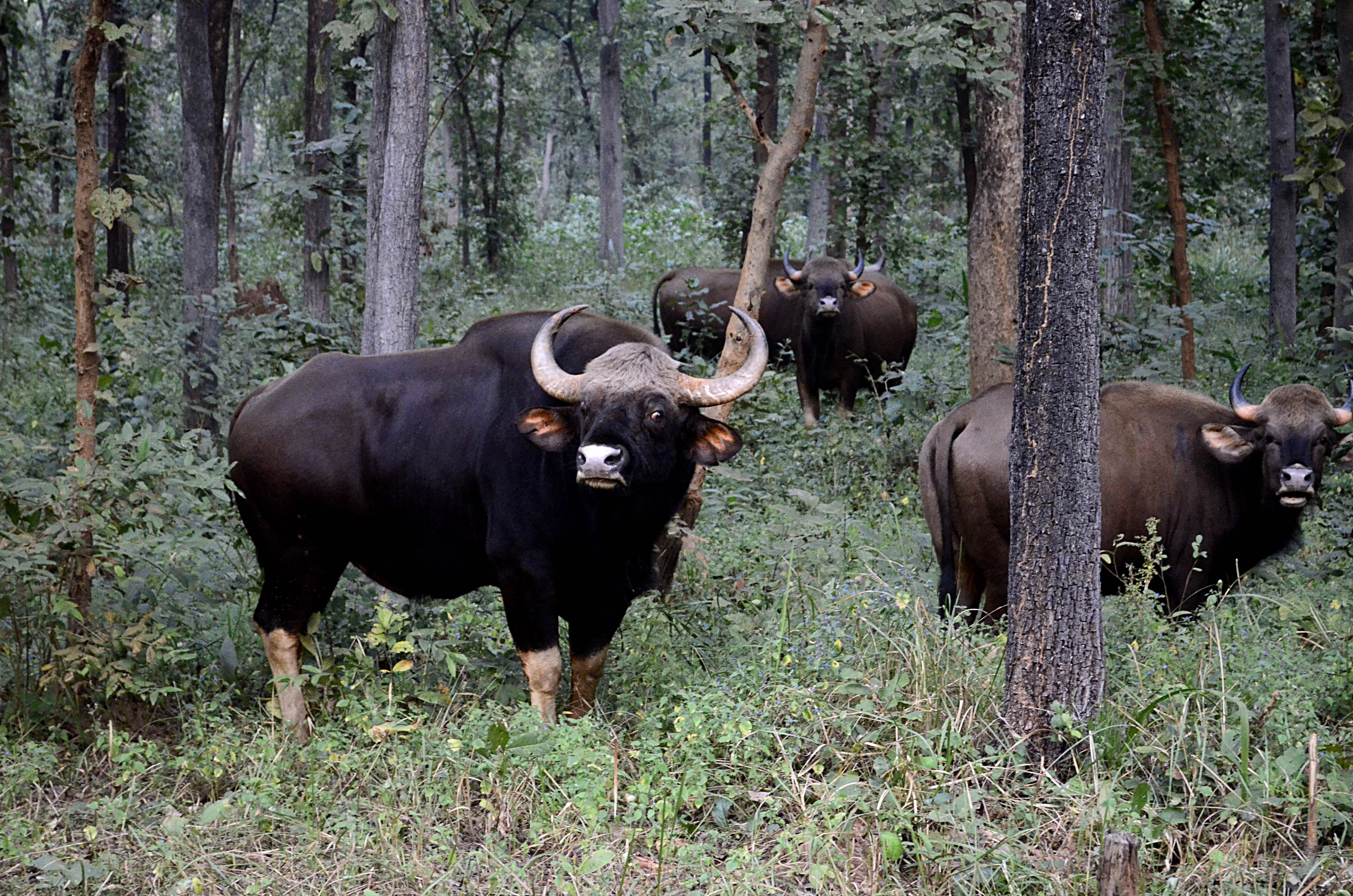
Indian bison (gaur) is present in parts of this ecoregion

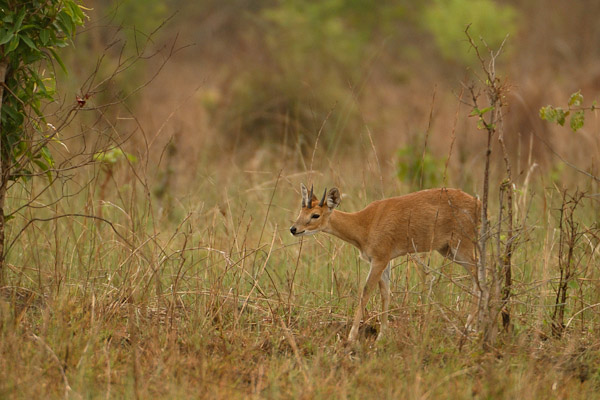
Several kinds of antilope and deer species live in this ecoregion (Chousingha)

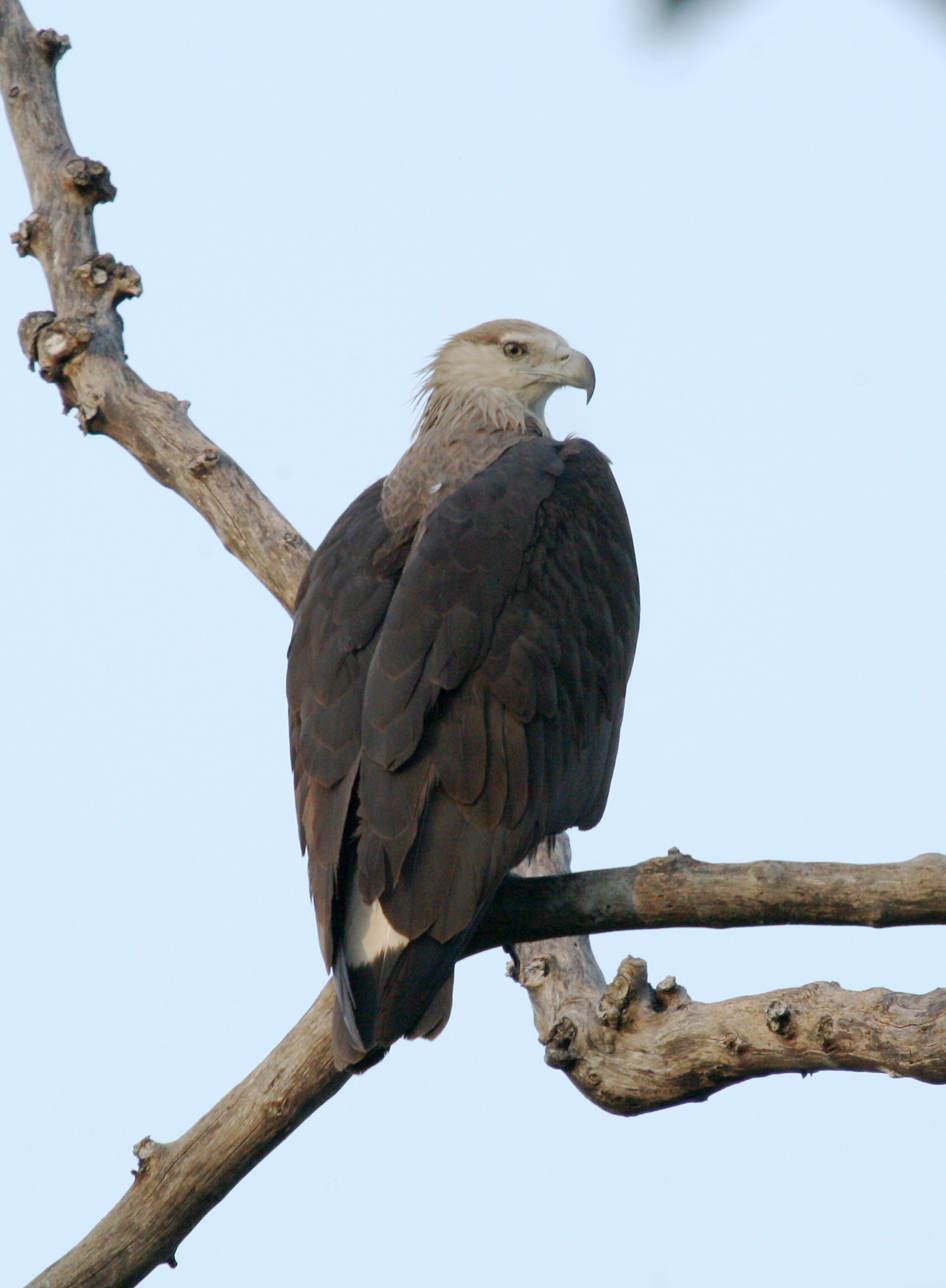
Pallas's fish-eagle, a globally threatened species, is living here

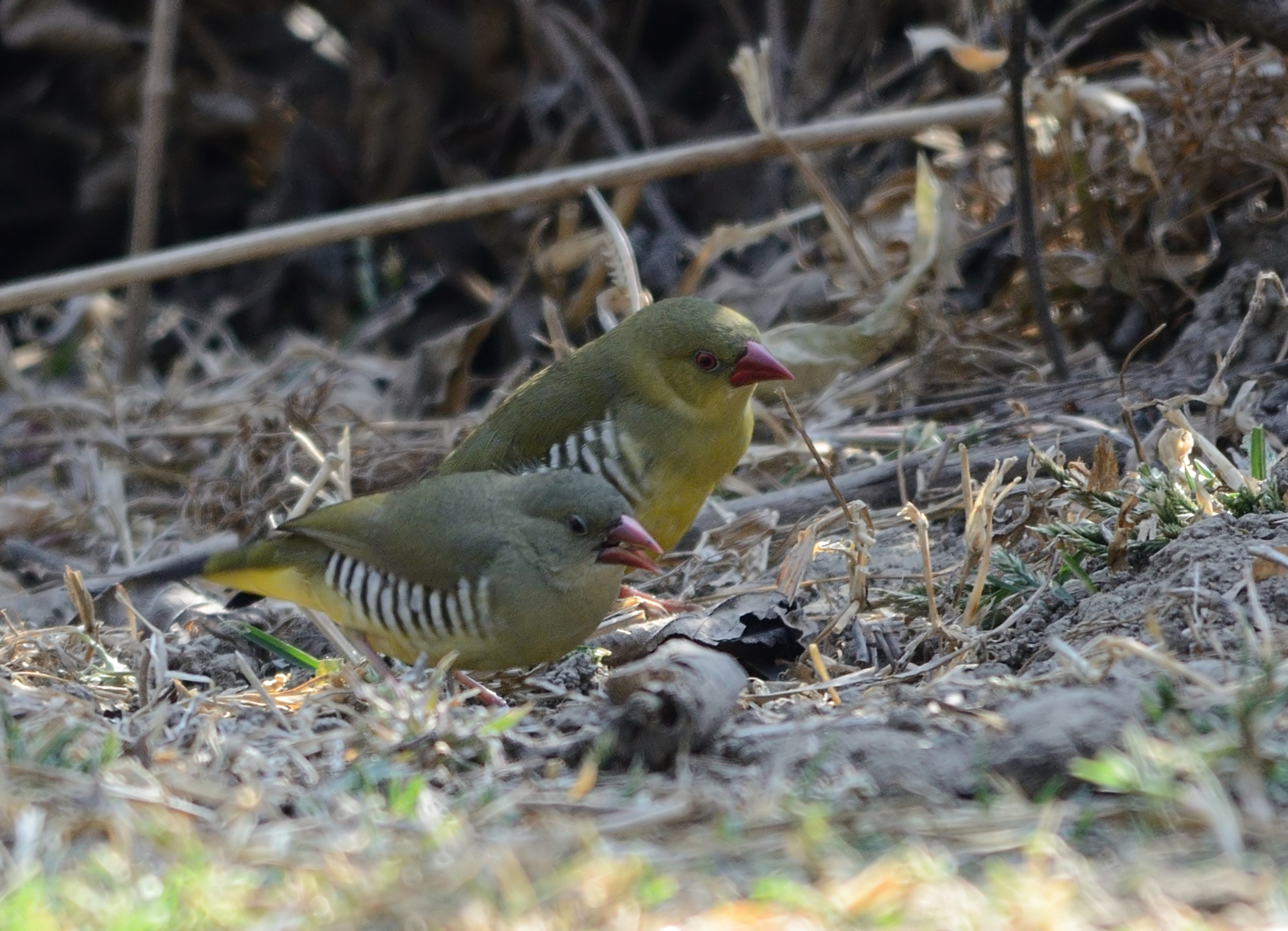
Green avadavat, a globally threatened species, has found a refuge in this ecoregion

== Conservation ==
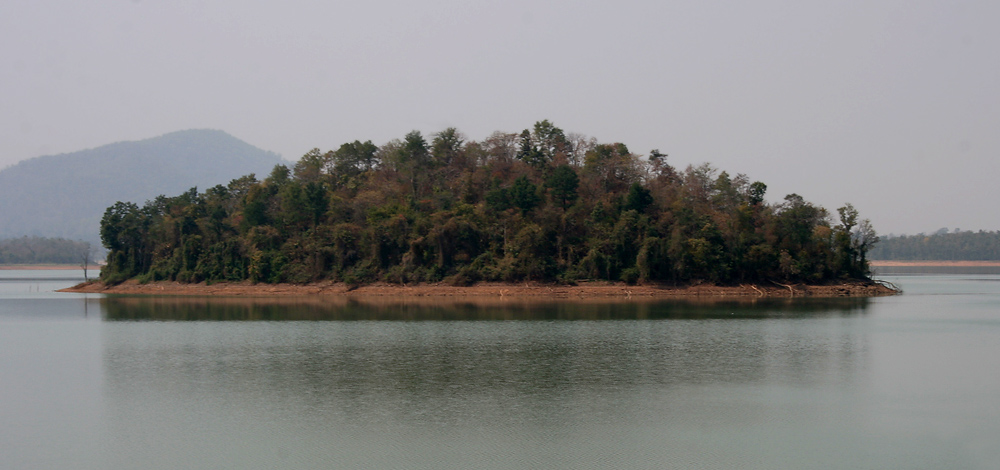
View from a dam in Kinnersani Wildlife Sanctuary in Telangana

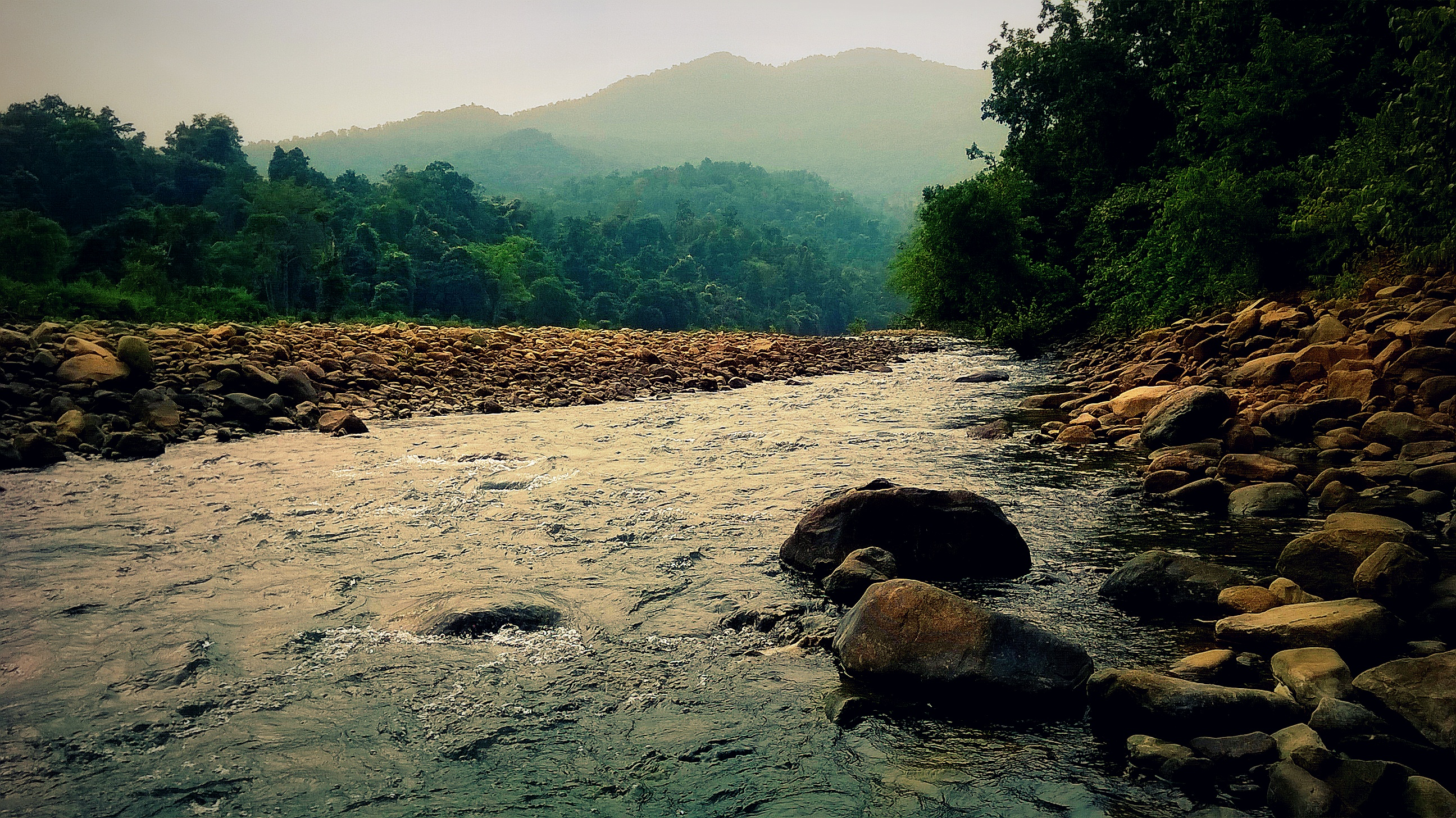
Palpala River near lulung, Similipal National Park in Odhisha

Approximately 25% of the original habitat remains, much of it in blocks of 5000 km^{2} or larger. 31 protected areas, totaling 13,540 km^{2}, preserve about 4% of the ecoregion's intact habitat. The largest protected area in the ecoregion is Simlipal National Park in Odisha state.

- Achanakmar Wildlife Sanctuary, Chhattisgarh (550 km^{2})
- Badalkhol Wildlife Sanctuary, Chhattisgarh (120 km^{2})
- Baisipalli Wildlife Sanctuary, Odisha (170 km^{2})
- Balimela Wildlife Sanctuary, Odisha (130 km^{2})
- Barnawapara Wildlife Sanctuary, Chhattisgarh (240 km^{2})
- Bhairamgarh Wildlife Sanctuary, Bijapur district, Chhattisgarh (160 km^{2})
- Bori Wildlife Sanctuary, Hoshangabad district, Madhya Pradesh (460 km^{2})
- Eturnagaram Wildlife Sanctuary, Warangal district, Telangana (120 km^{2})
- Hadgarh Wildlife Sanctuary, Odisha (140 km^{2})
- Indravati National Park, Bijapur district, Chhattisgarh (1,150 km^{2})
- Kambalakonda Wildlife Sanctuary, Visakhapatnam, Andhra Pradesh (70 km^{2})
- Kanha National Park, Mandla and Balaghat districts, Madhya Pradesh (900 km^{2})
- Karlapat Wildlife Sanctuary, Odisha (150 km^{2})
- Kawal Wildlife Sanctuary, Adilabad district, Telangana (1,080 km^{2})
- Kinnerasani Wildlife Sanctuary, Khammam district, Telangana (290 km^{2})
- Kolleru Wildlife Sanctuary (480 km^{2}, partially in the Central Deccan Plateau dry deciduous forests ecoregion).
- Kondakameru Wildlife Sanctuary, Odisha (400 km^{2})
- Kotgarh Wildlife Sanctuary, Odisha (400 km^{2})
- Lakhari Valley Wildlife Sanctuary, Ganjam district, Odisha (180 km^{2})
- Lanjamadugu Wildlife Sanctuary, Karimnagar district, Telangana (80 km^{2})
- Mahuadaur Wildlife Sanctuary, Jharkhand (60 km^{2})
- Pachmarhi Wildlife Sanctuary, Madhya Pradesh (500 km^{2})
- Pakhal Wildlife Sanctuary, Warangal district, Telangana (120 km^{2})
- Pamed Wildlife Sanctuary, Chhattisgarh (60 km^{2})
- Papikonda Wildlife Sanctuary, East and West Godavari districts, Andhra Pradesh (530 km^{2})
- Phen Wildlife Sanctuary, Mandla district, Madhya Pradesh (100 km^{2})
- Pranahita Wildlife Sanctuary, Adilabad district, Telangana (130 km^{2})
- Satkosia Gorge Wildlife Sanctuary, Odisha (790 km^{2})
- Satpura National Park, Madhya Pradesh (490 km^{2})
- Simlipal National Park, Mayurbhanj district, Odisha (2,550 km^{2}))
- Sitanadi Wildlife Sanctuary, Chhattisgarh (670 km^{2})
- Udanti Wildlife Sanctuary, Chhattisgarh (340 km^{2})

== See also ==
- List of ecoregions in India
- Flora of Madhya Pradesh
- Arid Forest Research Institute (AFRI)
