= Odisha semi-evergreen forests =

Ecoregion of India

Orissa semi-evergreen forests
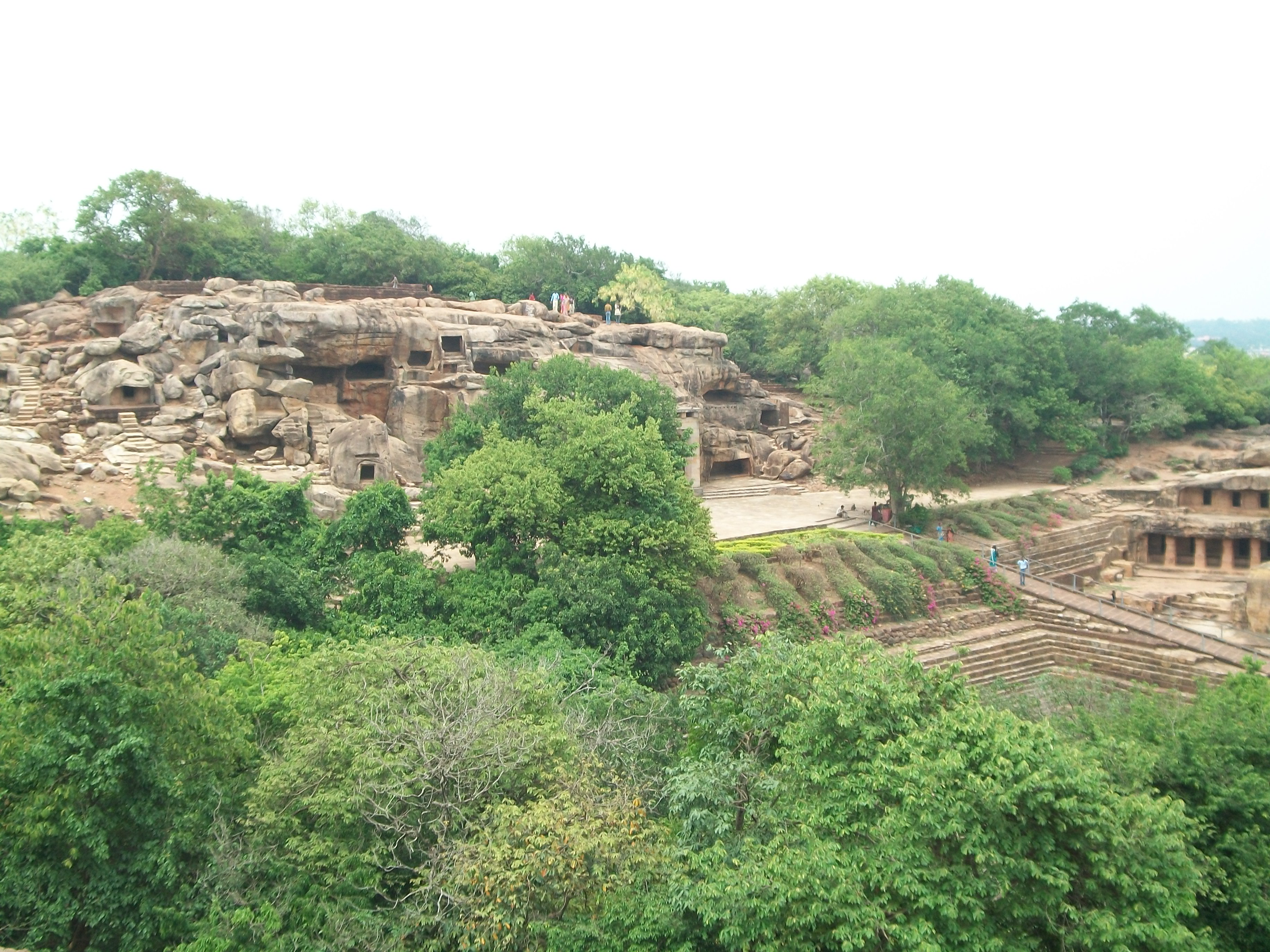
- Only small remnants of forest exist in this ecoregion

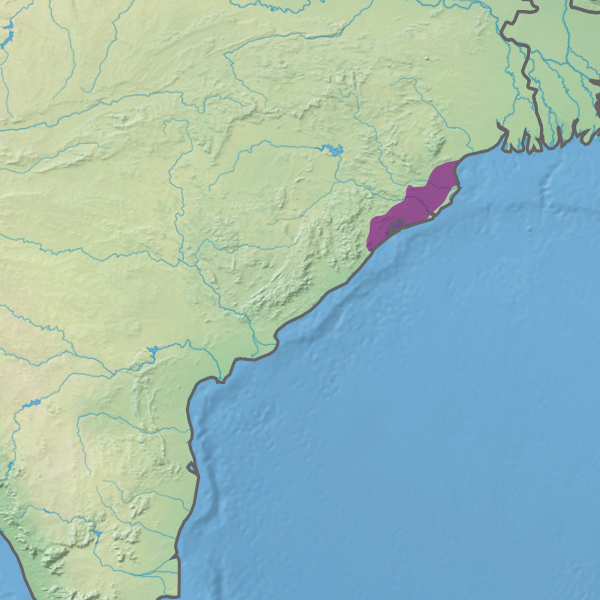
- Ecoregion territory (in purple)

Ecology
- Biome: Tropical moist broadleaf forest
- Borders: Godavari-Krishna mangroves; East Deccan moist deciduous forests; Lower Gangetic Plains moist deciduous forests
- Bird species: 215
- Mammal species: 59

Geography
- Area: 8,600 km^{2} (3,300 mi^{2})
- Country: India
- Coordinates: 20°19′N 85°58′E

Conservation
- Conservation status: Critical/Endangered
- Protected: 12.79%

The Odisha semi-evergreen forests (also Orissa semi-evergreen forests) are a tropical moist broadleaf forest ecoregion of eastern India. The ecoregion covers an area of 8,600 square kilometers (3,300 sq mi) on the coastal plain of Odisha state, bounded by the Eastern Highlands moist deciduous forests west and north-west, transitioning from the huge ecoregion Lower Gangetic Plains moist deciduous forests along the north coastland, and surrounding the smaller ecoregion Godavari-Krishna mangroves along a stretch of the south-east coast by the Bay of Bengal.

Several of Odisha's largest cities, including Bhubaneswar, Cuttack, Puri, Chhatrapur, Kendrapara, and Bhadrak, lie within this ecoregion, and it has been extensively cleared for agriculture and urbanization. According to the WWF, 96% of the ecoregion's area has been cleared, and only 4% remains in the original semi-evergreen rain forest. Much of the remaining forest has been degraded by grazing and fuelwood harvesting.

== Flora ==
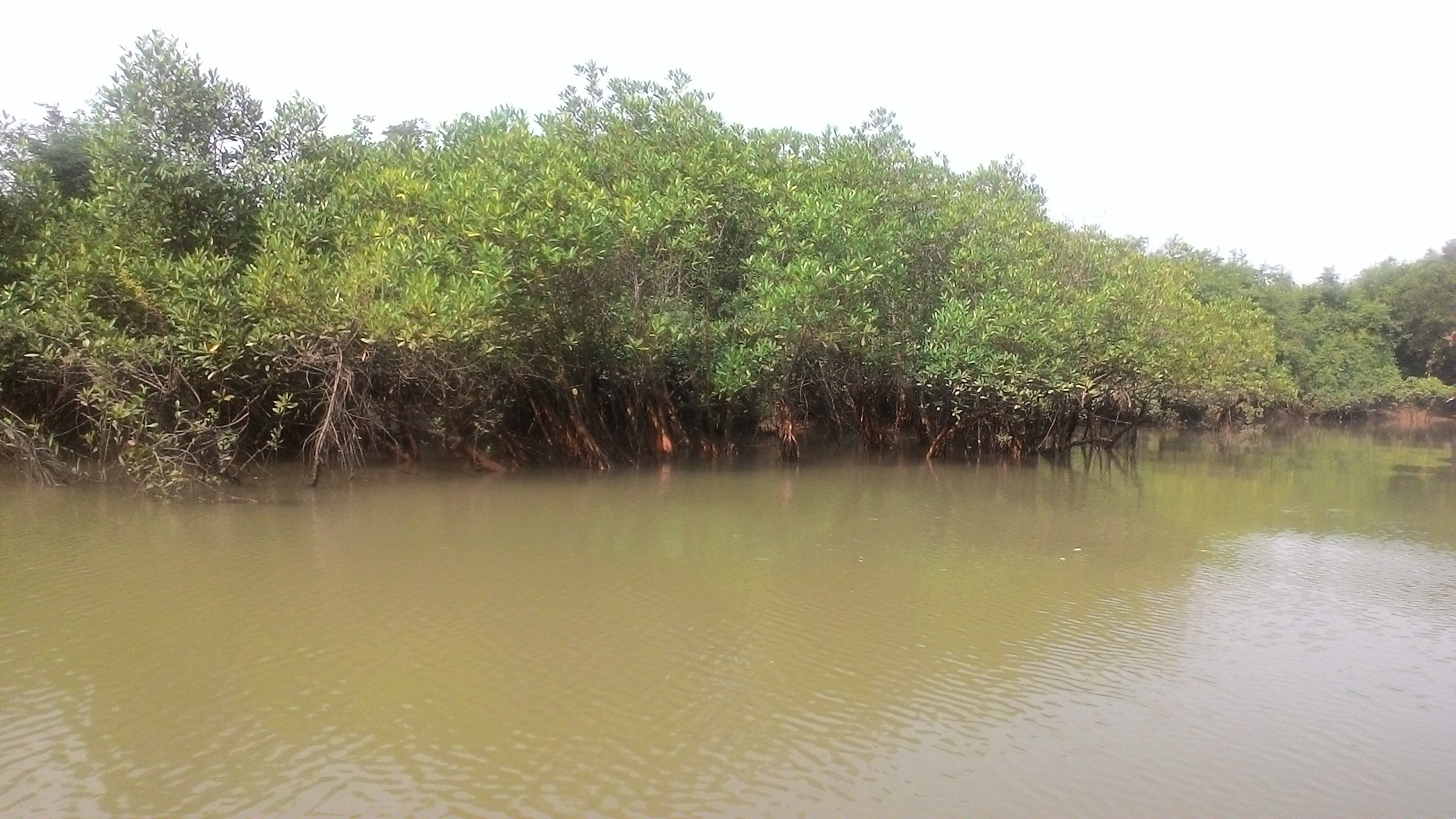
Some coastal and river spots have mangroves.

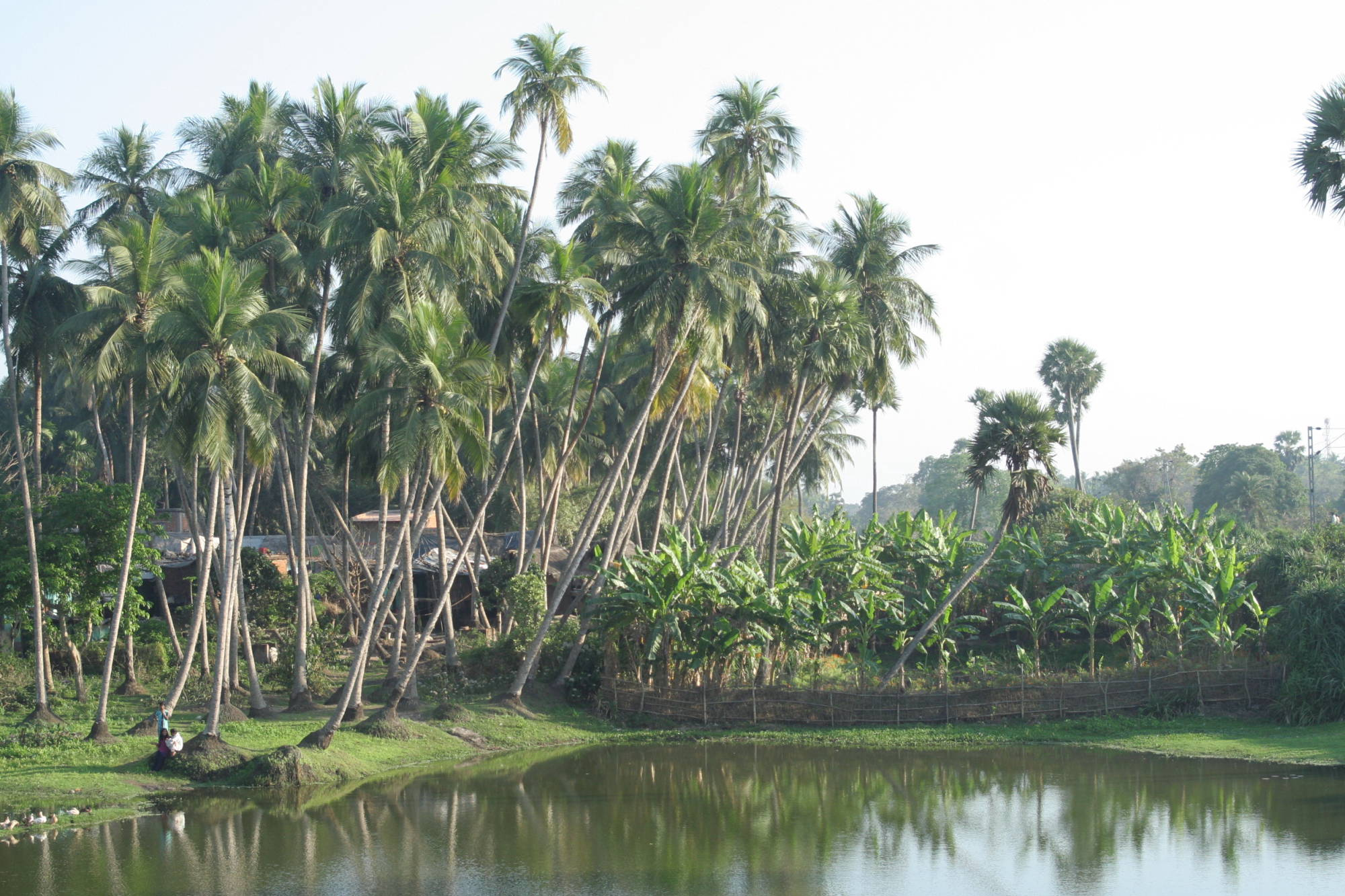
Palm trees near the coast

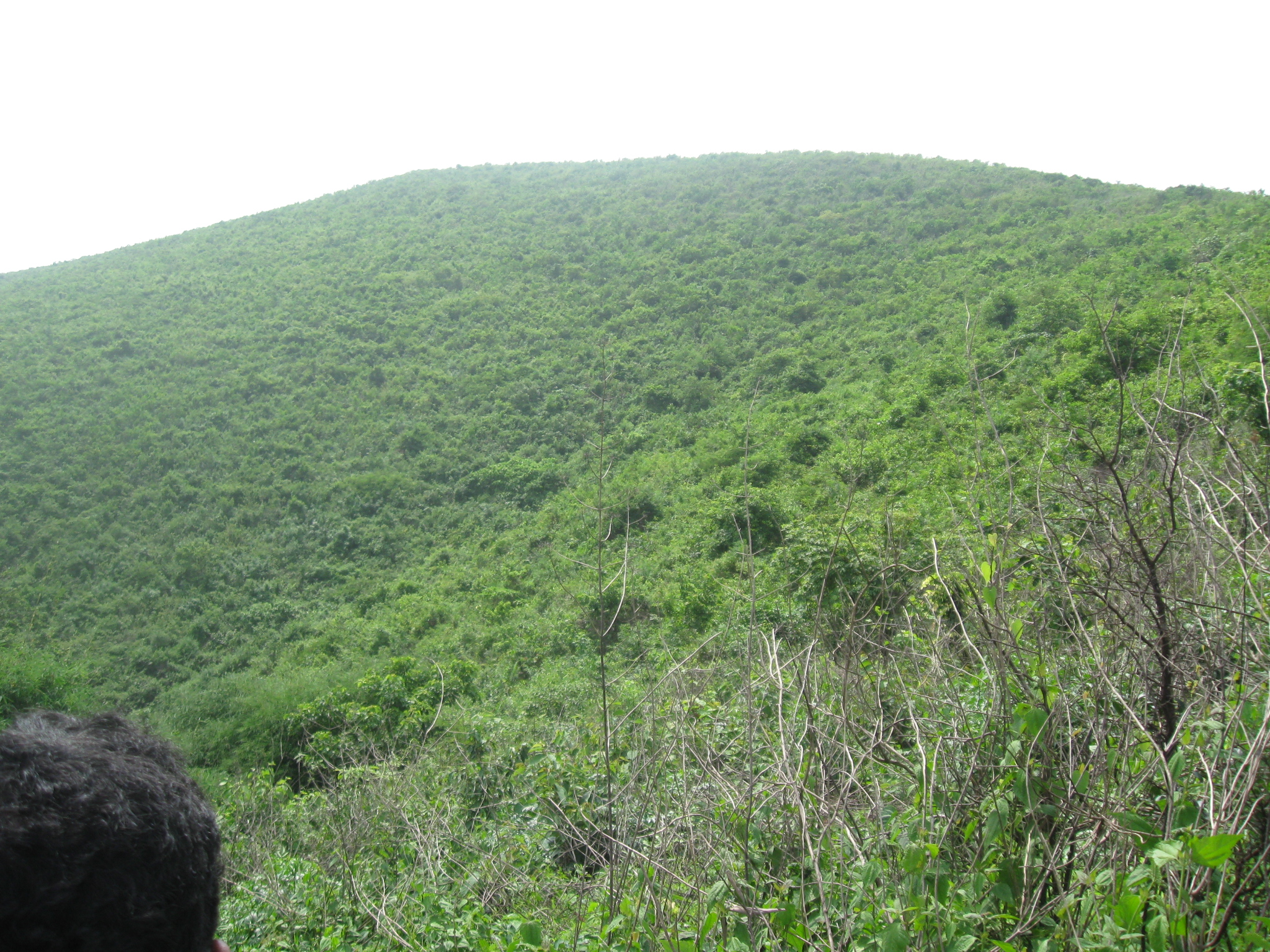
Barunei Hill near Bhubaneswar

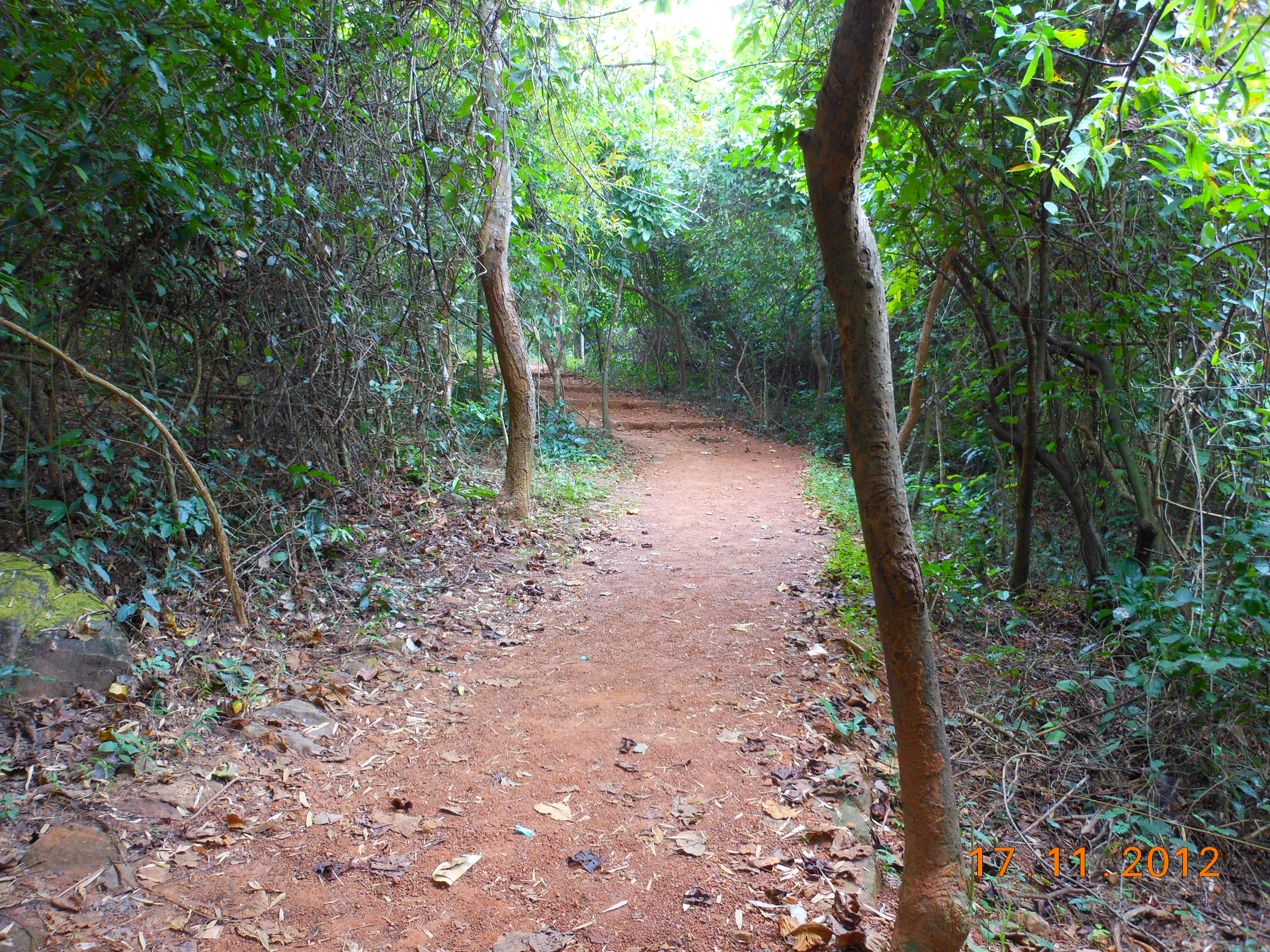
Inside a semi-evergreen (or semi-deciduous) forest in Odisha. Chandaka forest.

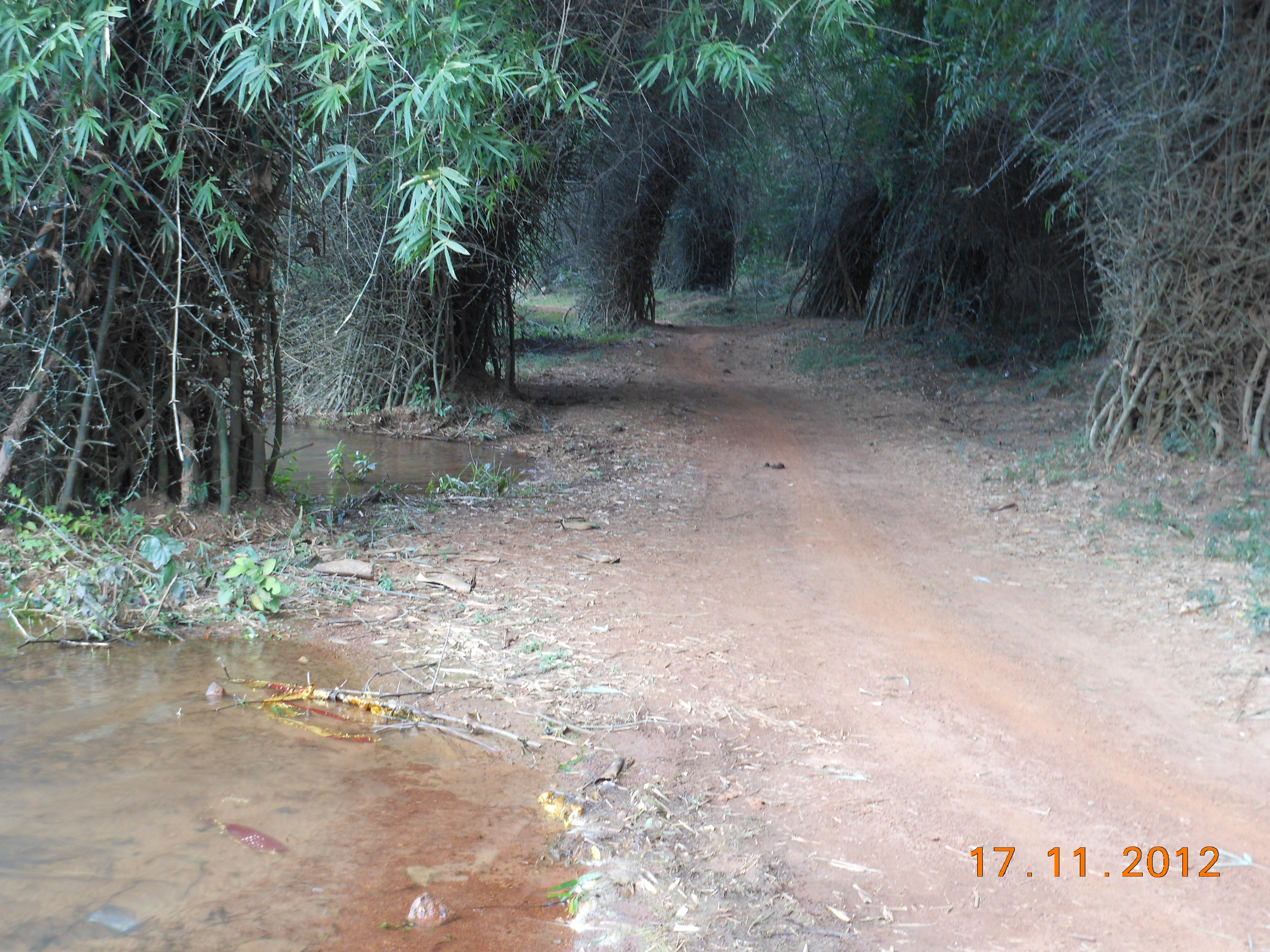
Special bamboo habitat in the forests. Chandaka forest.

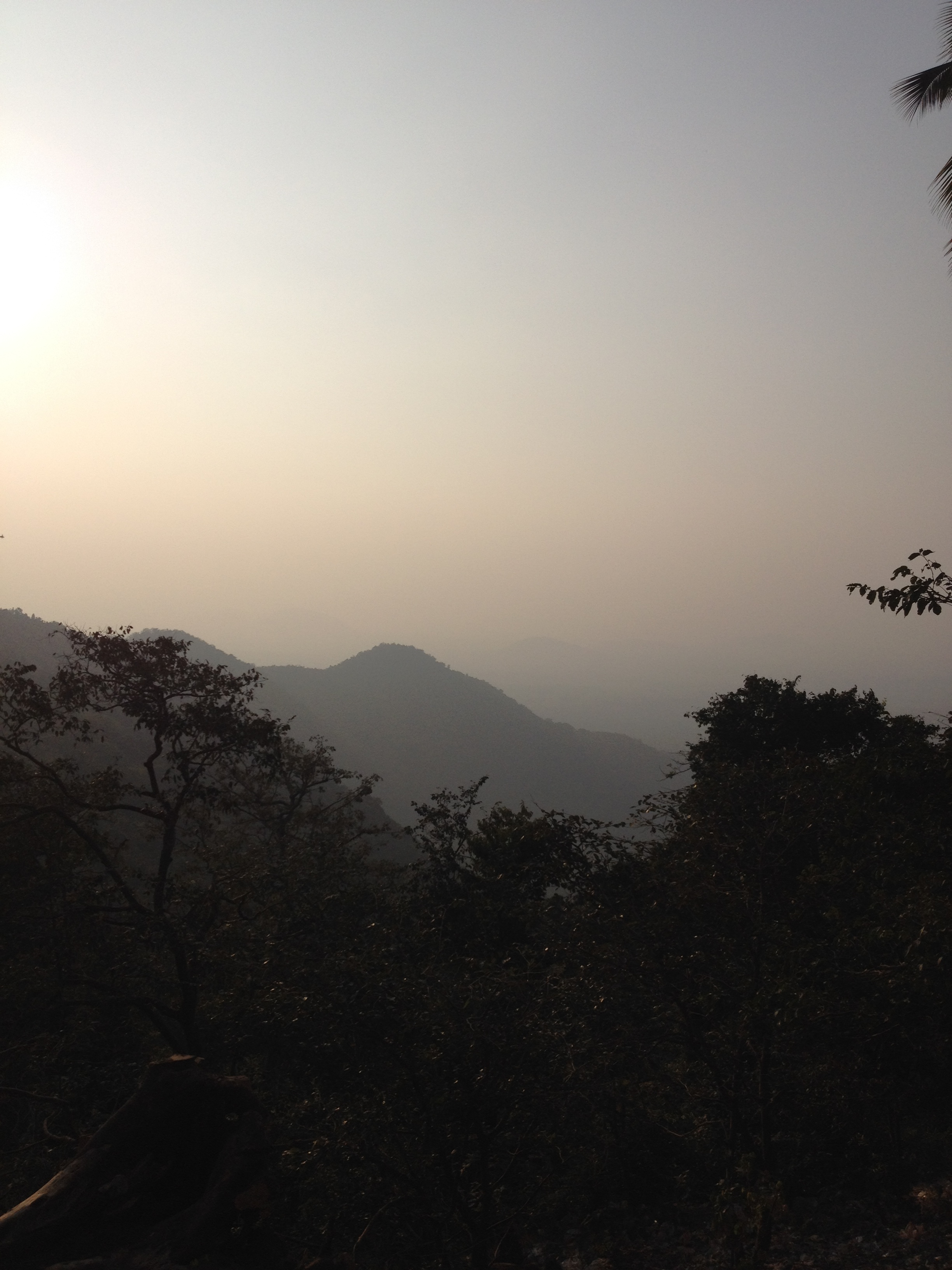
Kapilash Forest Range, inland hills

== Fauna ==
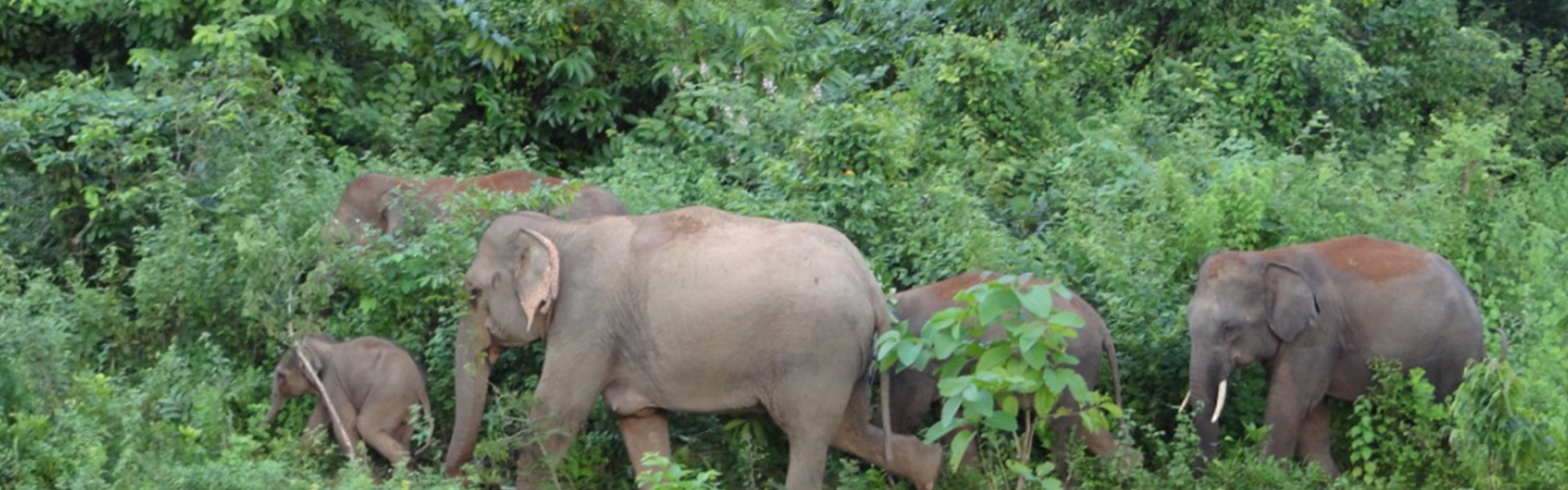
Elephants in Chandaka forest.

This ecoregion does not harbour any endemic species, but despite the heavy anthropogenic changes of the landscape and the almost total deforestation, several large mammals are still living here, including elephant and tiger. Important mammals in need of special attention here, includes the tiger, Asian elephant, gaur, dhole (cuon alpinus), sloth bear, and chousingha (tetracerus quadricornis).

The birdlife in the Odisha semi-evergreen ecoregion is quite diverse with 215 known species. The lesser florican (Eupodotis indica) is globally threatened and has found a sanctuary here.

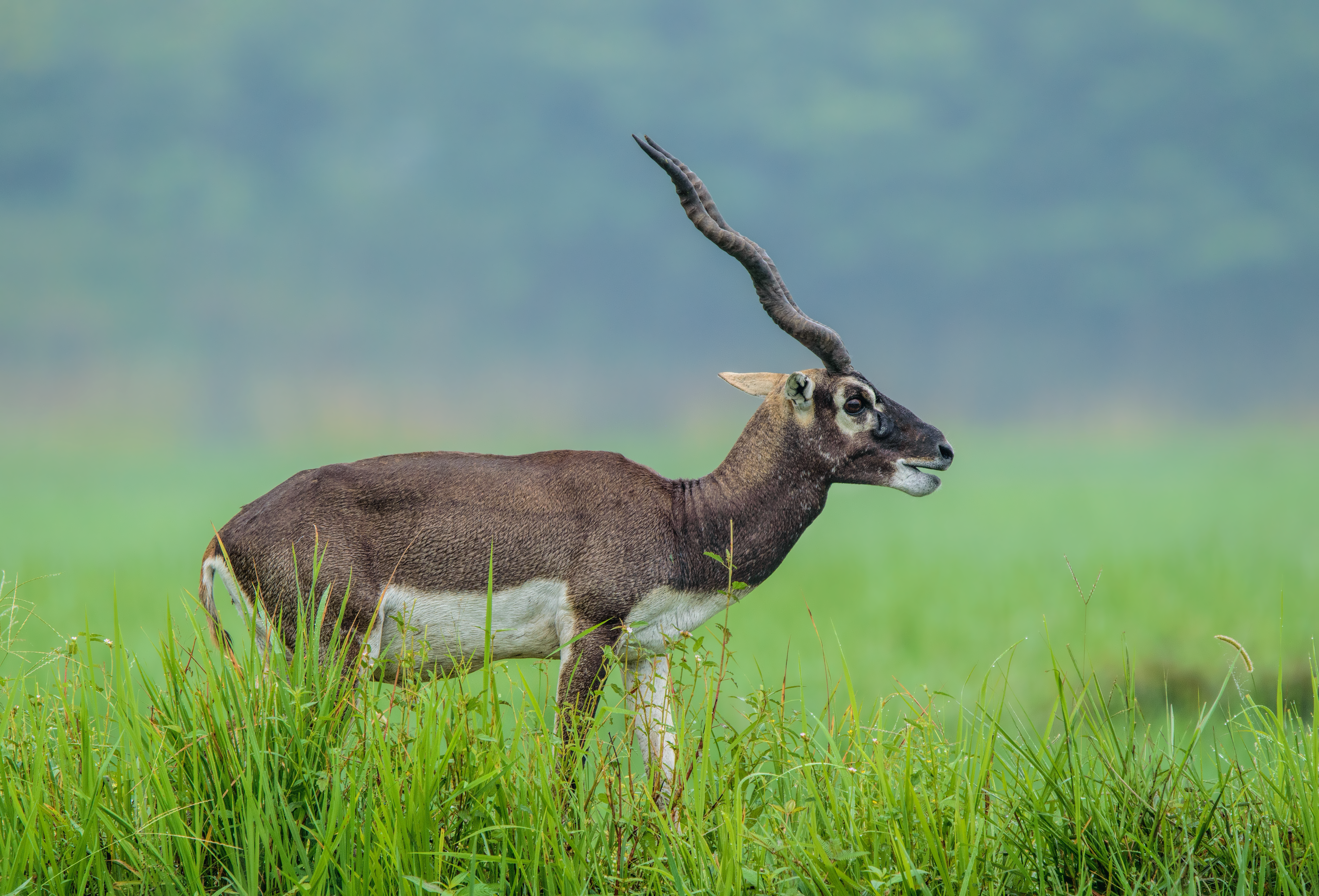
Black buck in the fields

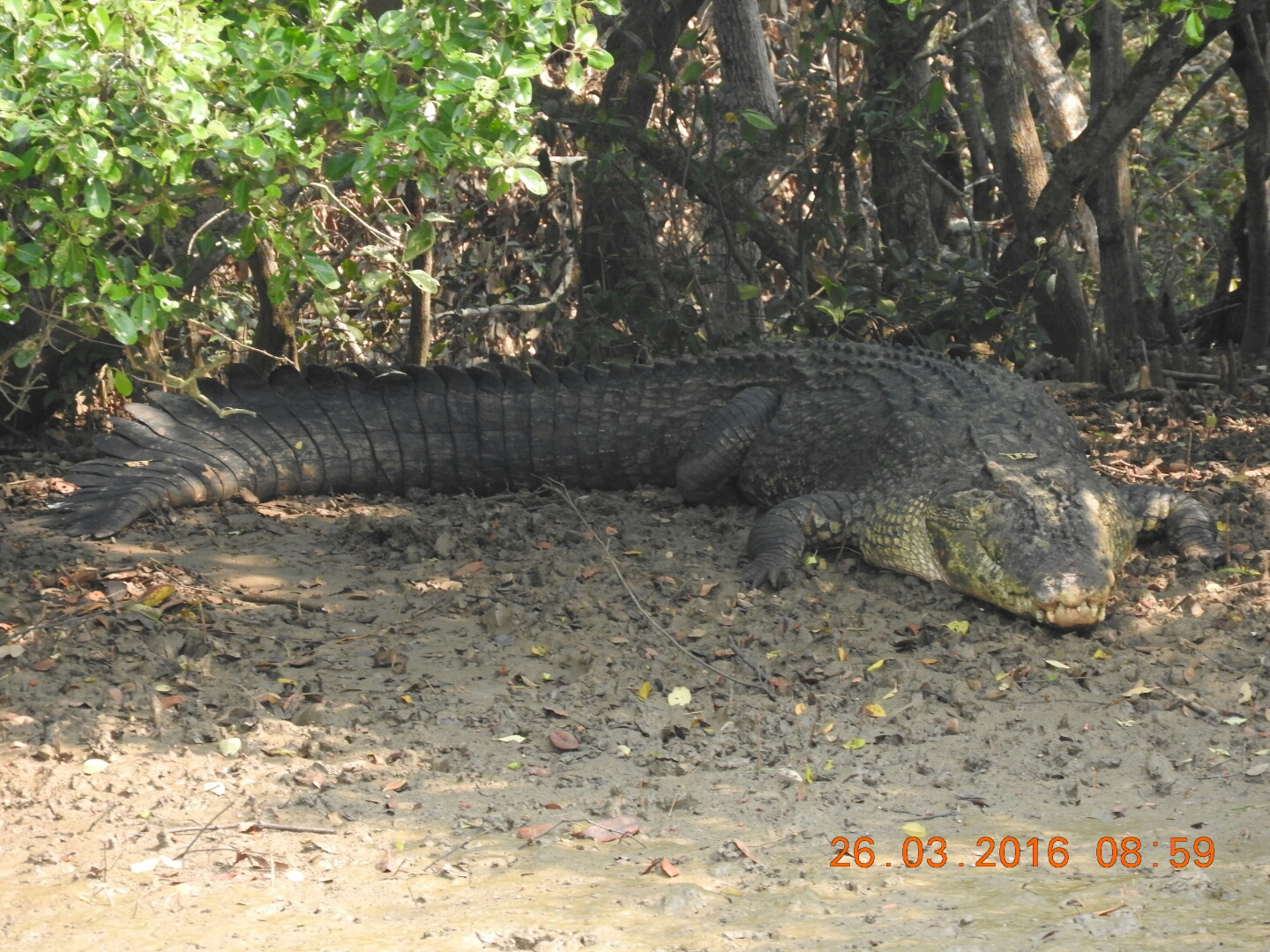
Saltwater crocodiles near the coasts

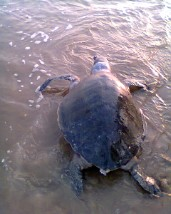
Olive ridley turtles lay eggs on the sandy beaches

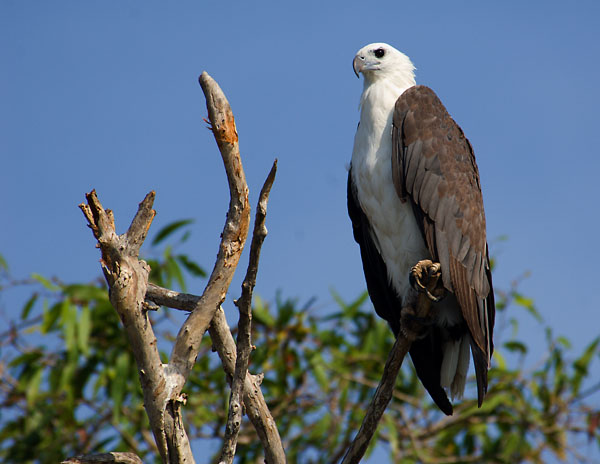
White-bellied sea eagle

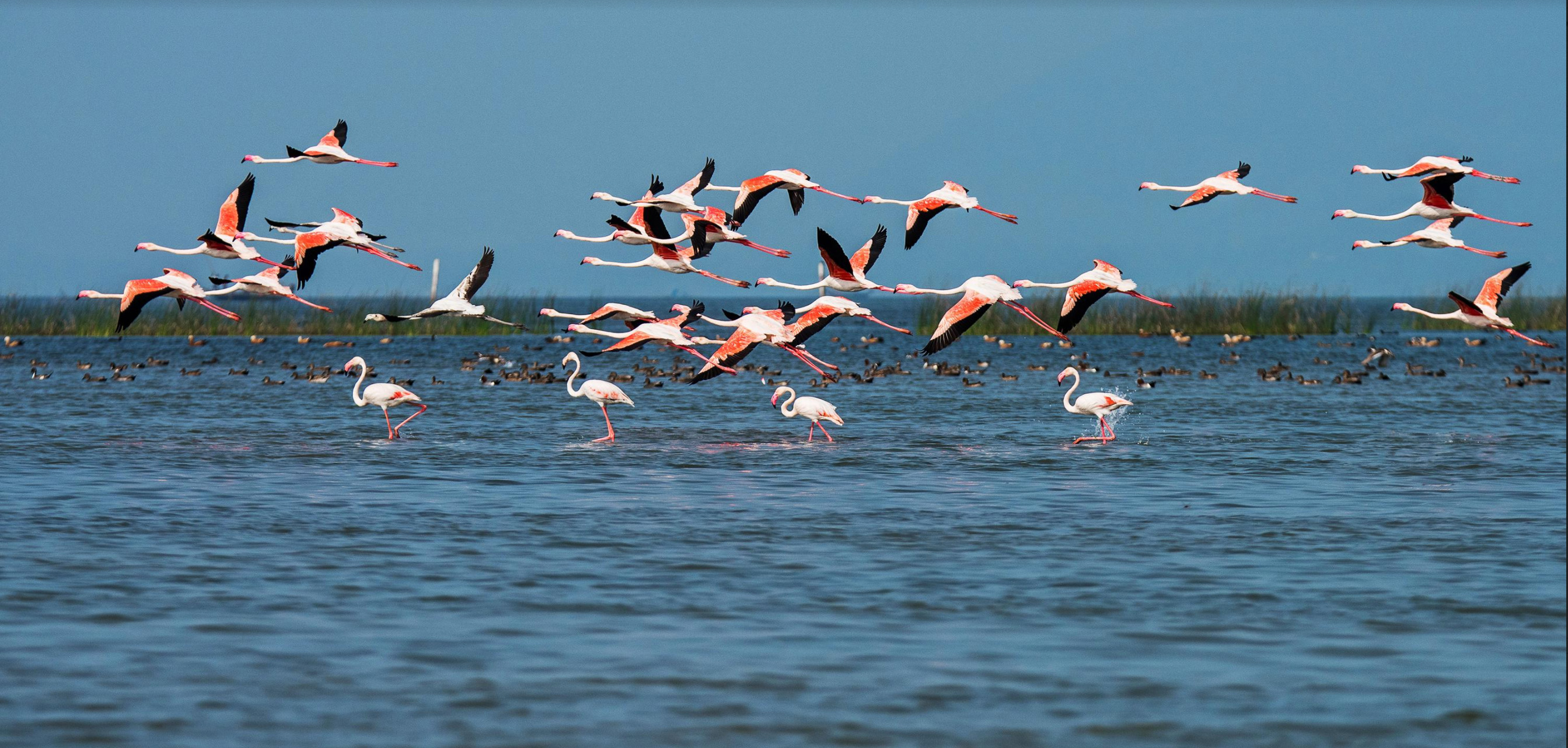
Greater flamingos (Phoenicopterus ruber)

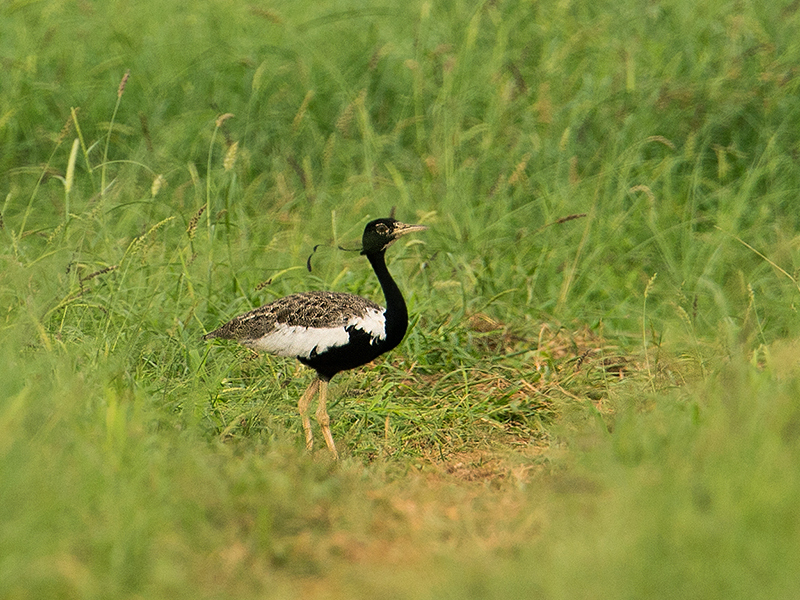
Lesser florican

== Protected areas ==
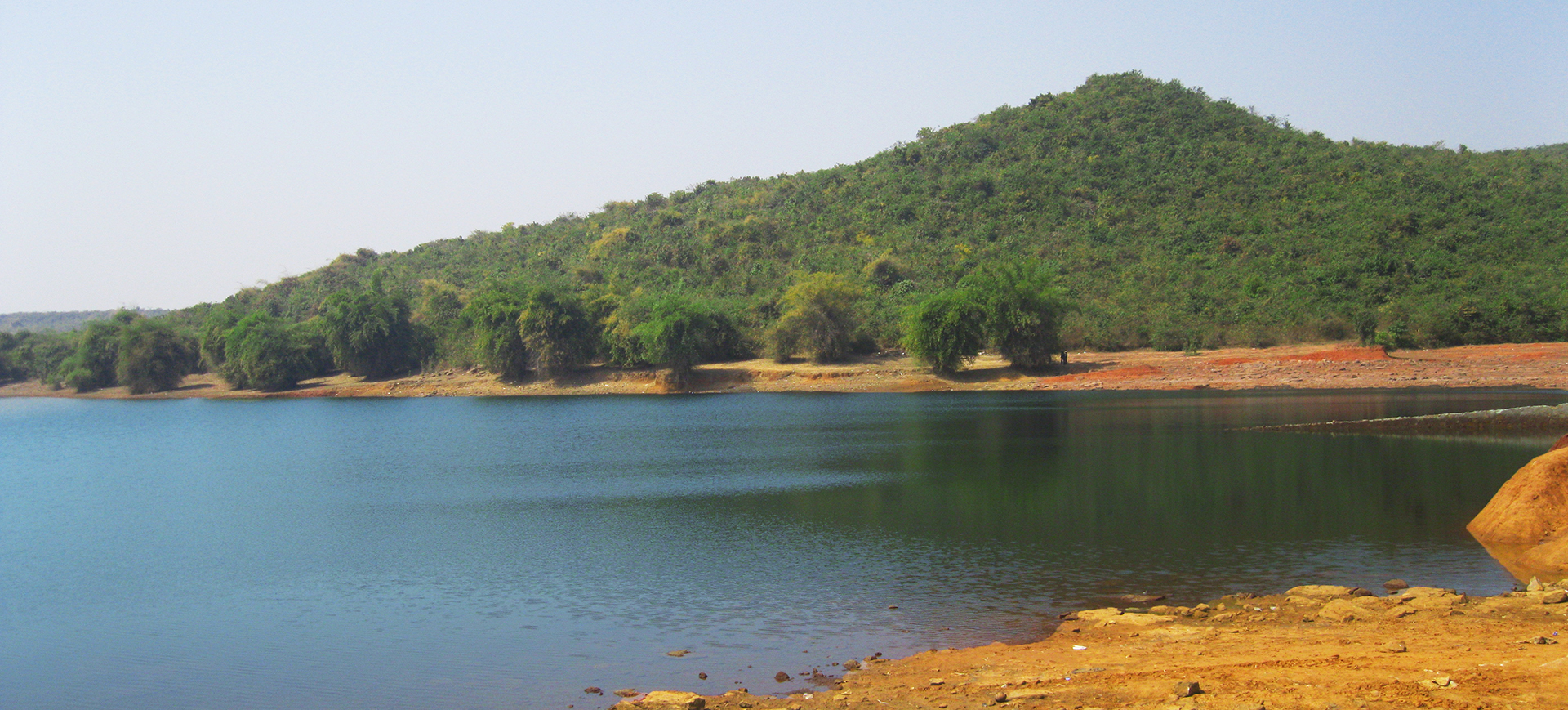
Small pockets of forest exists in some reserved areas, mainly in hilly areas. Chandaka Forest.

Of the total ecoregion area, about 12.8% is protected.

- Balukhand-Konark Wildlife Sanctuary (70 km^{2})
- Chilka Wildlife Sanctuary (980 km^{2}), including the Nalbana Bird Sanctuary
- Nandankanan Wildlife Sanctuary (50 km^{2})

Only tiny fragments of semi-deciduous forest remains in Kapilash Forest Range, Chandaka Forest, Bolagarh Forest and Khallikote Forest.

== Conservation ==
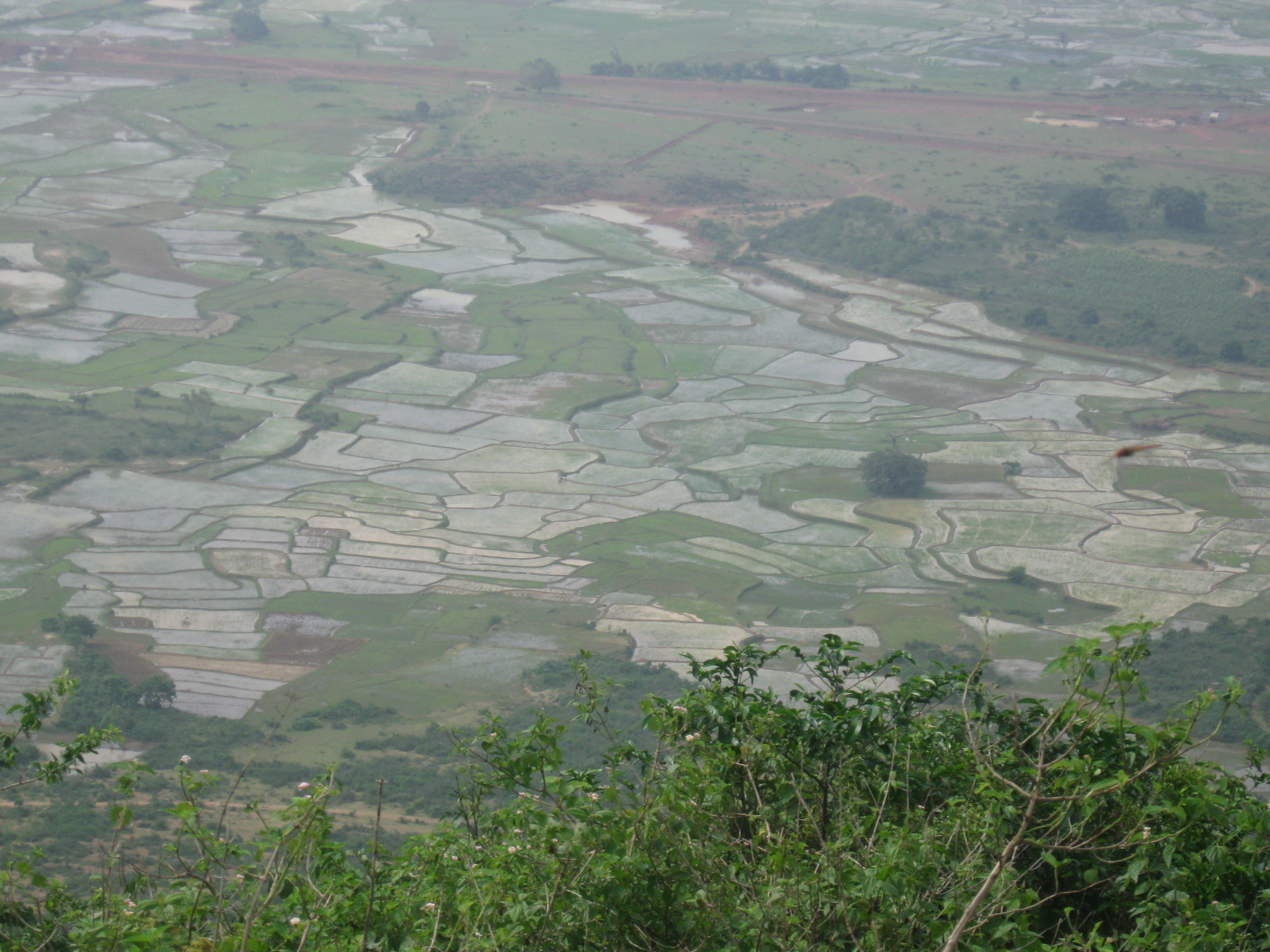
The original semi-evergreen forests of this ecoregion has been clearcut many years ago.

The original biome of this ecoregion is almost non-existing. According to older surveys, this has been the case since at least 1968. If left to itself, the habitat is believed to be replaced by tropical evergreen forests, not semi-evergreen forests.

=== Forest management ===
A study done by Reddy, Jha, & Dadhwal in this area is being used to shape environmental policies in India to protect biodiversity. Through monitoring long term forest resource changes show a loss in overall species and ecosystem services that can be measured in physical data. The results of this study show a connection between deforestation and habitat fragmentation, and loss of important biodiversity in the ecoregion.

== See also ==
- List of ecoregions in India
