= Kotgarh Wildlife Sanctuary =

- କୋଟଗଡ ବନ୍ୟଜନ୍ତୁ ସଂରକ୍ଷଣାଳୟ
- IUCN category IV (habitat/species management area)
- Location within Odisha Location within India
- Interactive map of Kotgarh Wildlife Sanctuary
- Location: Odisha, India
- Nearest city: Baliguda
- Coordinates: 19.8601157°N 83.621099°E
- Area: 399.05 km^{2} (154.07 sq mi)
- Designation: Wildlife Sanctuary
- Designated: 3 December 1981
- Governing body: Divisional Forest Officer, Baliguda Division, Kandhamal district, Ministry of Forest and Environment, Government of Odisha

Kotgarh Wildlife Sanctuary is situated in the Baliguda subdivision of Kandhamal district of Odisha state in India. It is classified as an Eastern Highlands moist deciduous forest. Around 52 tribal villages such as Kutia Kondh and Desia Kondh inhabit the sanctuary.

== About ==
Designated and proposed reserve forests include Madagoda 36.02 km^{2} (14 sq mi), Haripur 42.66 km^{2} (16 sq mi), Lassery72.96 km^{2} (28 sq mi), Bonduru3.67 km^{2} (1 sq mi), Supamaha7.55 km^{2} (3 sq mi), Killangi6.073 km^{2} (2 sq mi), Subarnagiri30.04 km^{2} (12 sq mi) and Guma14.04 km^{2} (5 sq mi). Kotgarh sanctuary spreads over Kotgarh jurisdiction, Tumudibandha range and Daringbadi block in Kandhamal district.

Kotgarh is nominated to be a part of the proposed 14 elephant corridors for safe movement of the elephants which frequently come out of their habitation in search of food and water.

== Flora ==
The main vegetation of the sanctuary consists of dense moist deciduous forests with grasslands. The floral diversity of the sanctuary consists of 650 plant species that include angiosperms, pteridophytes, gymnosperms, bryophytes, lichens and fungi. The dominant flora includes Sal, Piasal, Sisoo, Kendu, Gamhar, Asan, Kusum, Harida, Bahada, Amala, Mango, Tamarind, Mahua, Jackfruit, Randhan, Kangada, Jamun, Salapo, Bheru, Arjun, Char, Dhaura and Kochila.

There are many rare and endangered medicinal plants including Abutilon indicum, Cissus quadrangularis, Crateva magna, Cycas sphaerica, Garcinia xanthochymus, Gardenia gummifera, Gloriosa superba, Justicia adhatoda, Litsea glutinosa, Oroxylum indicum, Pueraria tuberosa, Rauvolfia tetraphylla, Saraca asoca, Steriospermum suaveolens, Symplocos racemosa, Tinospora cordifolia and Zanthoxylum armatum| Zanthoxylum rhetsa.

== Fauna ==
Animal species present in this sanctuary include Tiger, elephant, Gaur, Sambar deer, Spotted deer, Peafowl, Red jungle fowl, Black buck, Leopard, Sloth bear, Chital, other bird species and reptiles including rare species such as Boiga forsteni. Chousingha (Tetracerus quadricornis) or four-horned antelope are the main attraction in the sanctuary.

== Attractions ==
A wooden bungalow at Belghar attracts many nature loving visitors.

== How to reach ==
By Road : Baliguda is connected with Berhampur and other cities of Orissa via NH-59.

By Rail : Nearest Rail Head is at Berhampur on S.E. Railway 180 km from Muniguda.

By Air : Nearest Air Port is at Bhubaneswar which is 291 km from Balliguda

== See also ==
- Wildlife sanctuaries of India
- Baliguda (Odisha Vidhan Sabha constituency)
