= Kondakameru Wildlife Sanctuary =

Coordinates: 18.366719°N 81.982249°E

Kondakameru Wildlife Sanctuary is a wildlife sanctuary in Malkangiri district, Odisha, India.

It covers an area of 430 km^{2}, mostly small hills and valleys. It is in the Eastern Highlands moist deciduous forests ecoregion. The major plant communities are mixed deciduous forests and scrublands.
