= Lakhari Valley Wildlife Sanctuary =

Sanctuary in Ganjam District, Odisha, India

Coordinates: 19.586315°N 84.689685°E

- IUCN category IV (habitat/species management area)
- Interactive map of Lakhari Valley Wildlife Sanctuary
- Location: Gajpati district, Odisha, India
- Area: 118 km^{2} (46 sq mi)
- Established: 1985

The Lakhari Valley Wildlife Sanctuary is located in Ganjam District, Odisha, India.

The wildlife sanctuary has an area 118 km^{2} (46 sq mi), in the Lakhari Valley of the Eastern Ghats range. The plant communities include coastal Sal (Shorea robusta) forests and mixed deciduous forests. Lakhari Valley is located in the Eastern Highlands moist deciduous forests ecoregion.

Villagers staying near the gate of the sanctuary report the absence of any significant wildlife in the region belonging to Chandragiri Range.
