= Balimela Wildlife Sanctuary =

Coordinates: 18.221411°N 82.105731°E

Balimela Wildlife Sanctuary is a wildlife sanctuary in Malkangiri district, Odisha, India.

It covers an area of 160 km^{2}. The terrain is hilly, and covered with mixed deciduous forests. It is in the Eastern Highlands moist deciduous forests ecoregion.
