= Karlapat Wildlife Sanctuary =

Wildlife sanctuary in Odisha, India

- karlapat wildlife sanctuary
- IUCN category IV (habitat/species management area)
- Location within Odisha Location within India
- Interactive map of Karlapat Wildlife Sanctuary
- Nearest city: Kalahandi
- Coordinates: 19.686735°N 83.062584°E
- Area: 147.66 kilometres (91.75 mi)
- Designated: April 2, 1992
- Governing body: Ministry of Forest and Environment, Government of Odisha

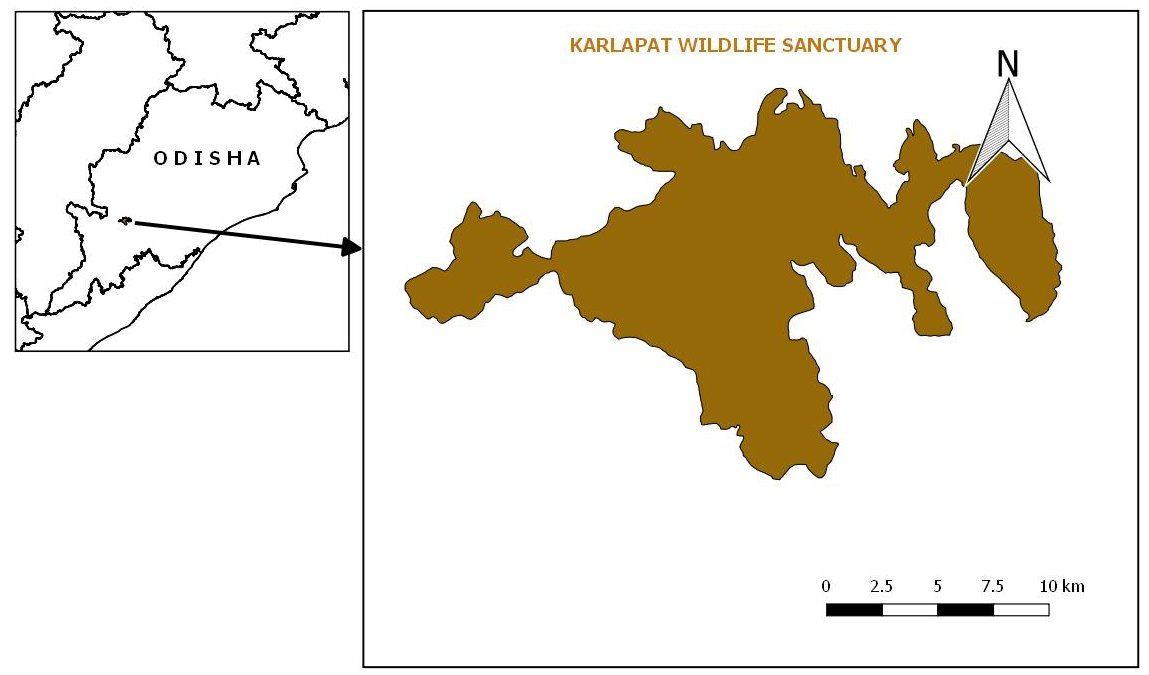
Location Map of Karlapt Wildlife Sanctuary, Odisha, India.jpg

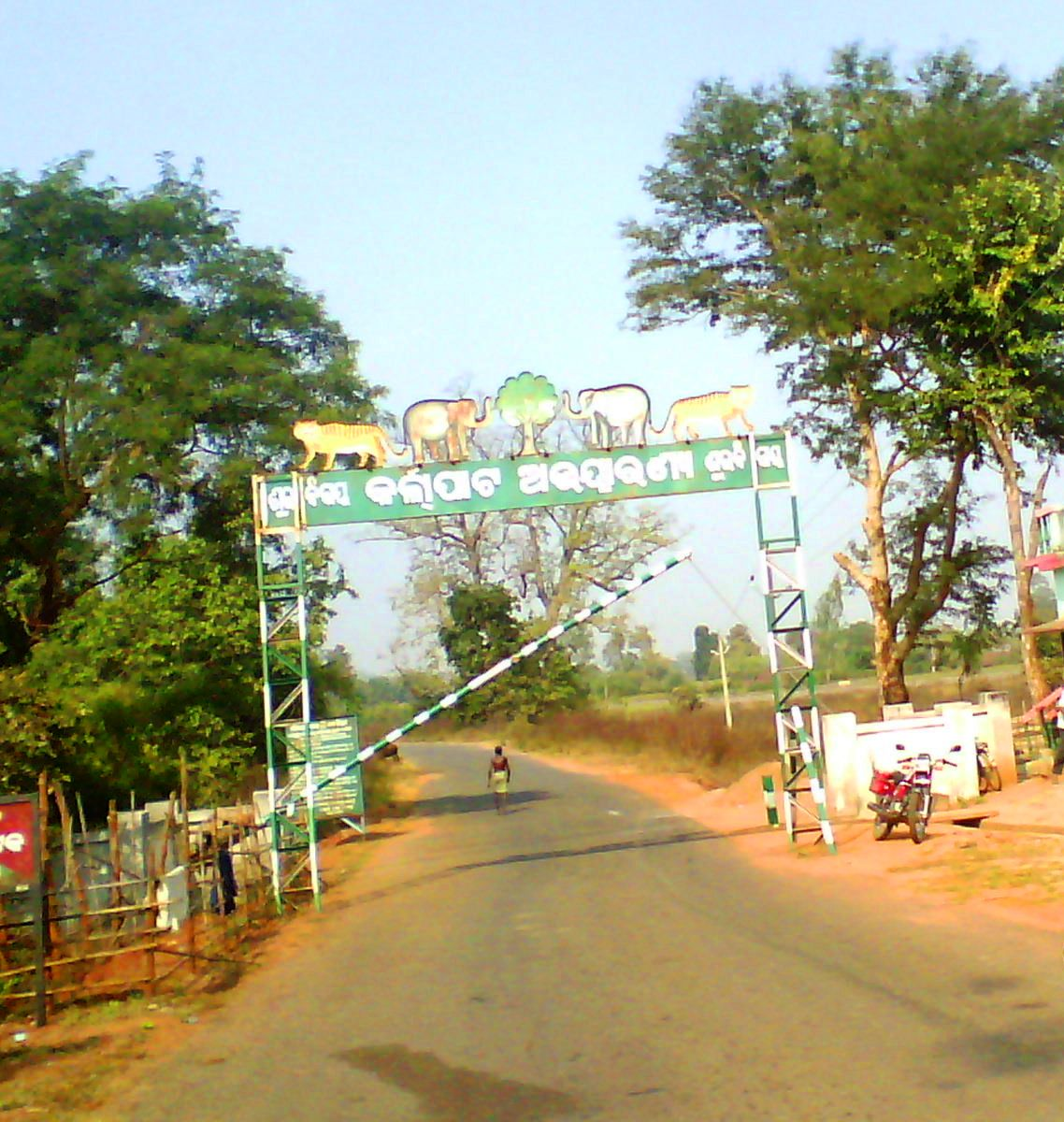
Karlapat Entrance

Karlapat Wildlife Sanctuary (Odia: କର୍ଲାପାଟ୍) is a wildlife sanctuary located in Kalahandi district and a popular tourist attraction of Odisha in India. Karlapat Wildlife Sanctuary is about 15 km from Bhawanipatna, the district headquarters of Kalahandi district.

The sanctuary covers an area of 175 square kilometres (68 sq mi). It lies within the Eastern Highlands moist deciduous forests ecoregion. Major plant communities include mixed deciduous forests and scrublands. The forest consists of flora like Sal, Bija, Asan, Harida, Amala, Bahada and Bamboo and varieties of medicinal plants.

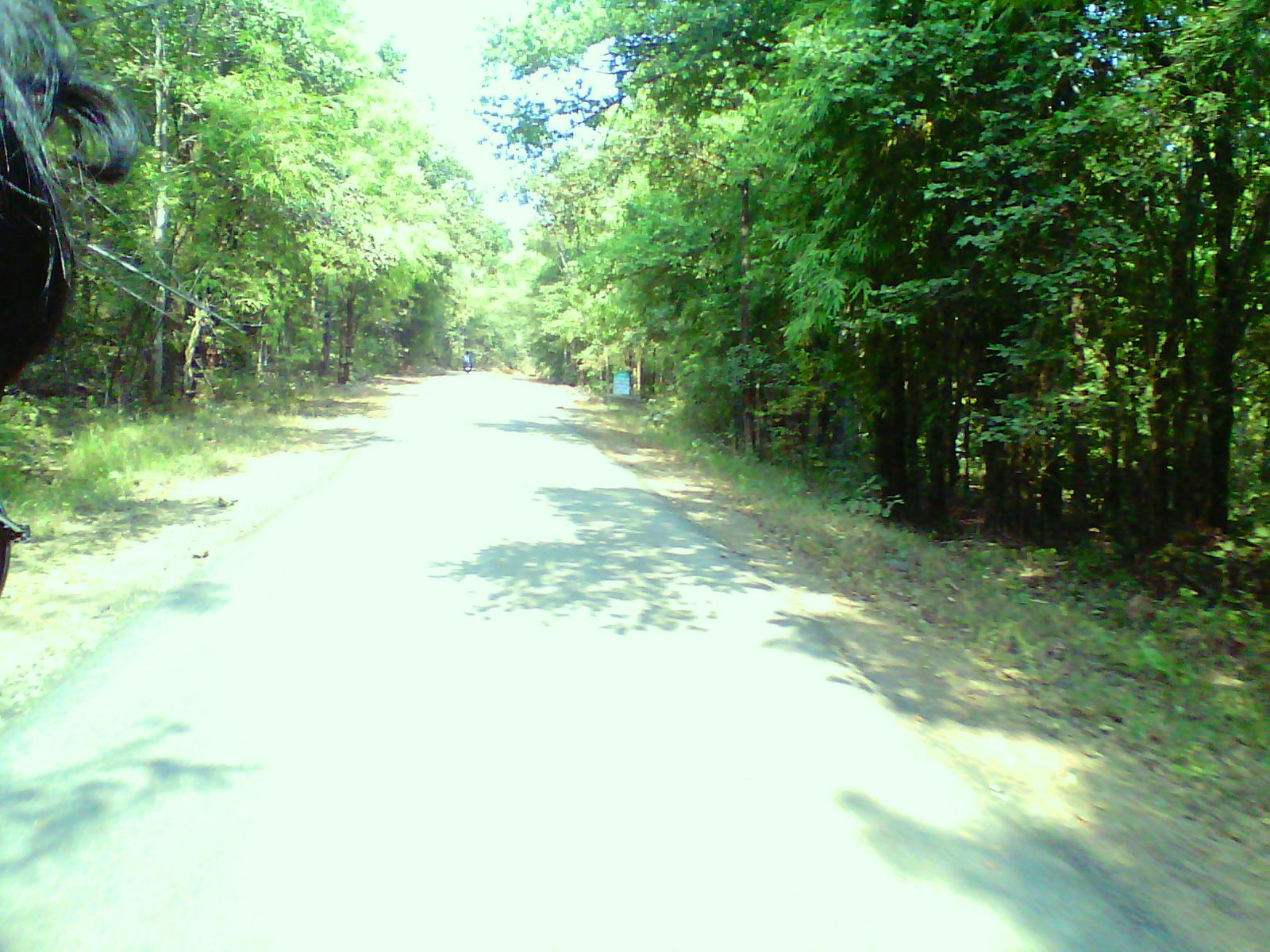
Karlapat Road

This sanctuary is home to many wildlife species like tiger, leopard, sambar, nilgai, barking deer, mouse deer, a wide variety of birds like green munia, Great Eared-nightjar and various reptiles.
