= Northern dry deciduous forests =

Ecoregion of India

Coordinates: 21°45′56″N 84°52′05″E

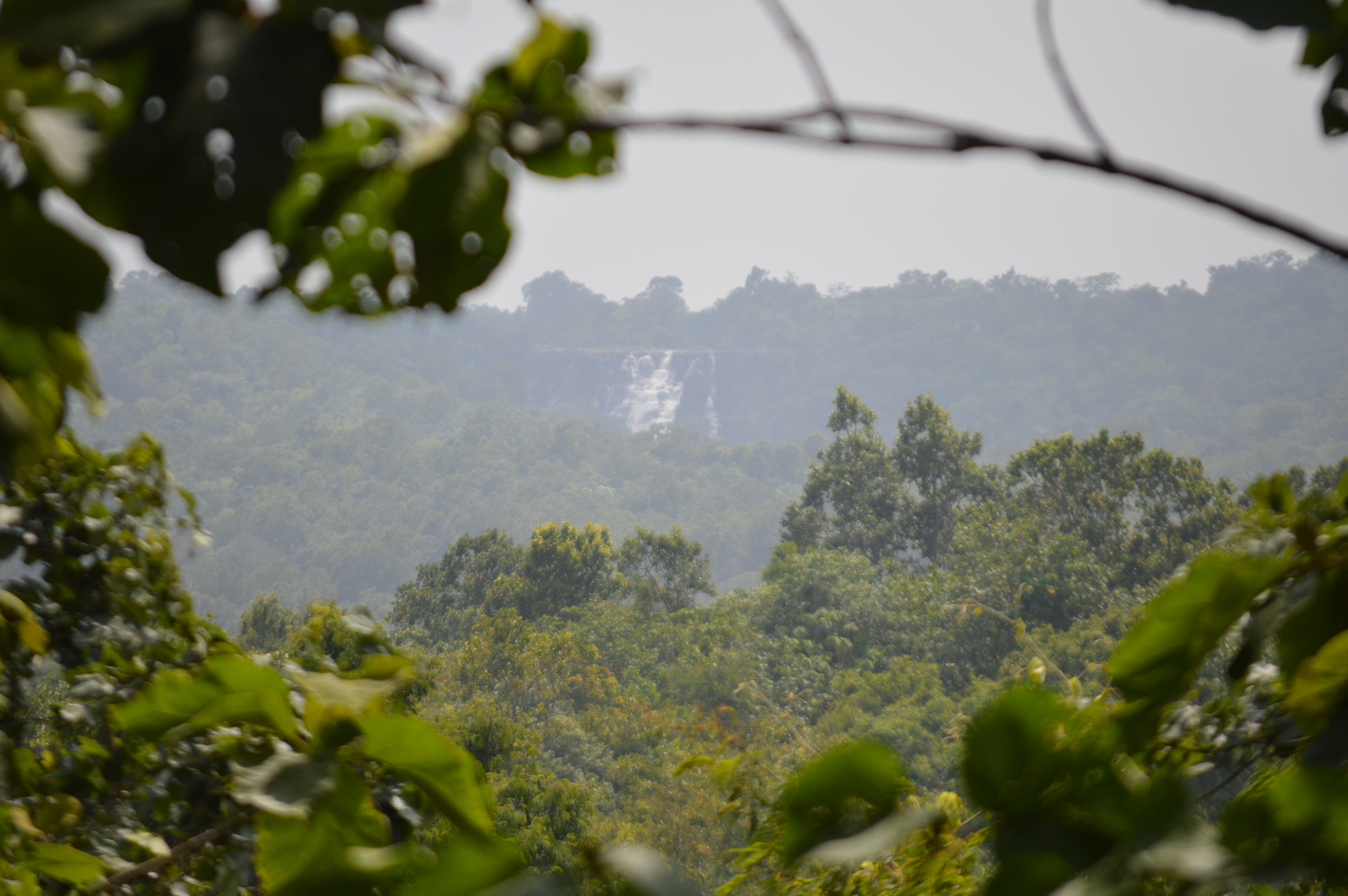
- Kanger Valley National Park

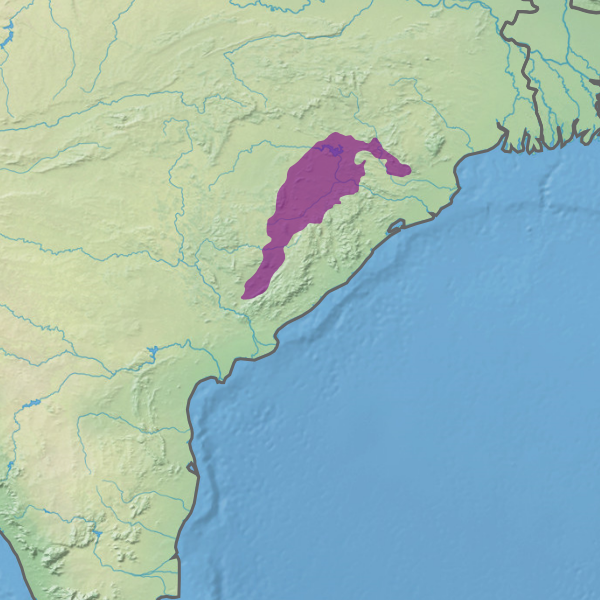
- Ecoregion territory (in purple)

Ecology
- Realm: Indomalayan
- Biome: tropical and subtropical dry broadleaf forests
- Borders: Eastern Highlands moist deciduous forests

Geography
- Area: 58,154 km^{2} (22,453 sq mi)
- Country: India
- States: Odisha; Chhattisgarh; Andhra Pradesh

Conservation
- Conservation status: critical/endangered
- Protected: 1,604 km^{2} (3%)

The Northern dry deciduous forests, presently known as the North Deccan dry deciduous forests, is a tropical dry broadleaf forest ecoregion of east-central India.

== Geography ==
It covers an area of 58,200 square kilometers (22,500 sq mi), mostly in western Odisha state, with portions in neighboring Chhattisgarh. The region extends northeast–southwest in the dry western rain shadow of the Eastern Ghats range, which block the moisture-laden monsoon winds from the Bay of Bengal to the east. It is surrounded by the more humid Eastern Highlands moist deciduous forests ecoregion.

The ecoregion lies mostly in the middle basin of the Mahanadi River and its tributary the Tel. The southern portion of the ecoregion lies in the upper basin of the Indravati River, a tributary of the Godavari.

== Flora ==
The original vegetation was a multi-storied forest of mostly dry-season deciduous trees, dominated by sal (Shorea robusta). Little of the original forest remains. Teak (Tectona grandis), which favors drier conditions, is more common in the remaining forests. Frequent fires, intensive grazing, and over-harvesting trees for firewood and fodder has reduced other areas to open scrubland or savanna. Much of the ecoregion has been converted to agriculture or pasture.

== Fauna ==
The ecoregion has 68 native mammal species. Threatened mammals include the tiger (Panthera tigris), dhole (Cuon alpinus), sloth bear (Melursus ursinus), and chousingha (Tetracerus quadricornis).

There are 261 bird species in the ecoregion. They include the Indian grey hornbill (Ocyceros birostris) and Oriental pied hornbill (Anthracoceros albirostris).

== Conservation ==
A 1997 assessment found that more than three-quarters of the ecoregion's natural habitat had been cleared or degraded. Four protected areas encompassed about 2.5 percent of the ecoregion's area. A 2017 assessment estimated that 1,604 km^{2}, or 3%, of the ecoregion is in protected areas. Another 12% is forested but unprotected.

- Debrigarh Wildlife Sanctuary, Odisha (340 km^{2})
- Gomarda Wildlife Sanctuary, Raigarh district, Chhattisgarh (290 km^{2})
- Kanger Ghati National Park, Chhattisgarh (230 km^{2})
- Sunabeda Tiger Reserve, Nuapada district, Odisha (591 km^{2})

== See also ==
- List of ecoregions in India
