= Sitanadi Wildlife Sanctuary =

Wildlife sanctuary in Chhattisgarh, India

- IUCN category IV (habitat/species management area)
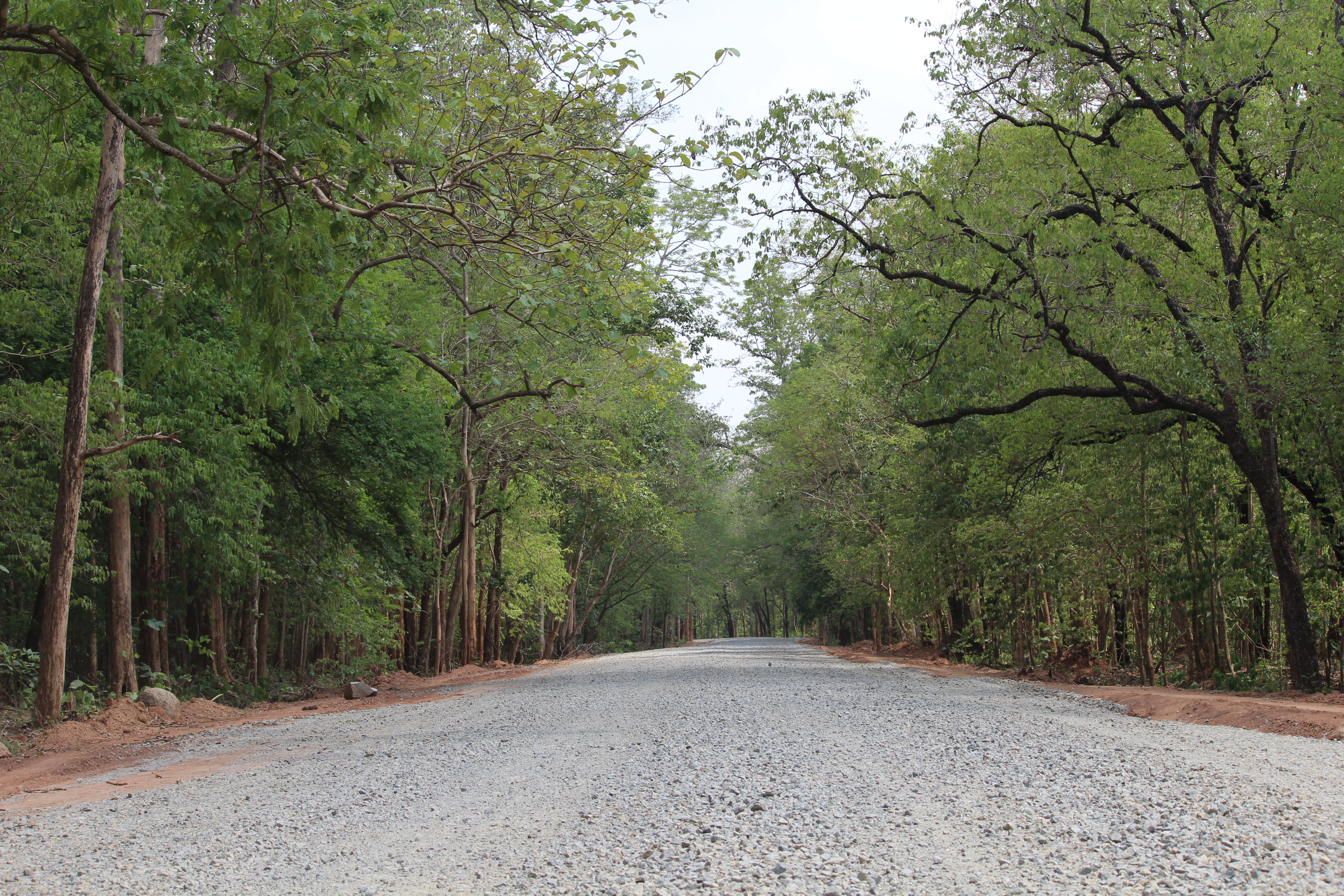
- Forest in Sitanadi Wildlife Sanctuary

- Location within Chhattisgarh Location within India
- Interactive map of Sitanadi Wildlife Sanctuary
- Location: Dhamtari district, Chhattisgarh, India
- Coordinates: 20°11′8″N 81°56′10″E
- Area: 556 km^{2} (215 sq mi)
- Established: 1974

Sitanadi Wildlife Sanctuary is located in Dhamtari District, Chhattisgarh, India. The wildlife sanctuary was established in 1974 under Wildlife Protection Act of 1972. The sanctuary sprawls over an area of 556 km^{2}.

== Geography ==
It is named after Sitanadi River which originates from this sanctuary and joins Mahanadi River near Deokhut. It has an altitude ranging between 327 and 736 m above the sea level. Sitanadi Wildlife Sanctuary is known for its lush green flora and rich and unique and diverse fauna and has great potential to emerge as one of the finest wildlife destinations in central India. Teak and bamboo predominate among the vegetation.

== Fauna ==
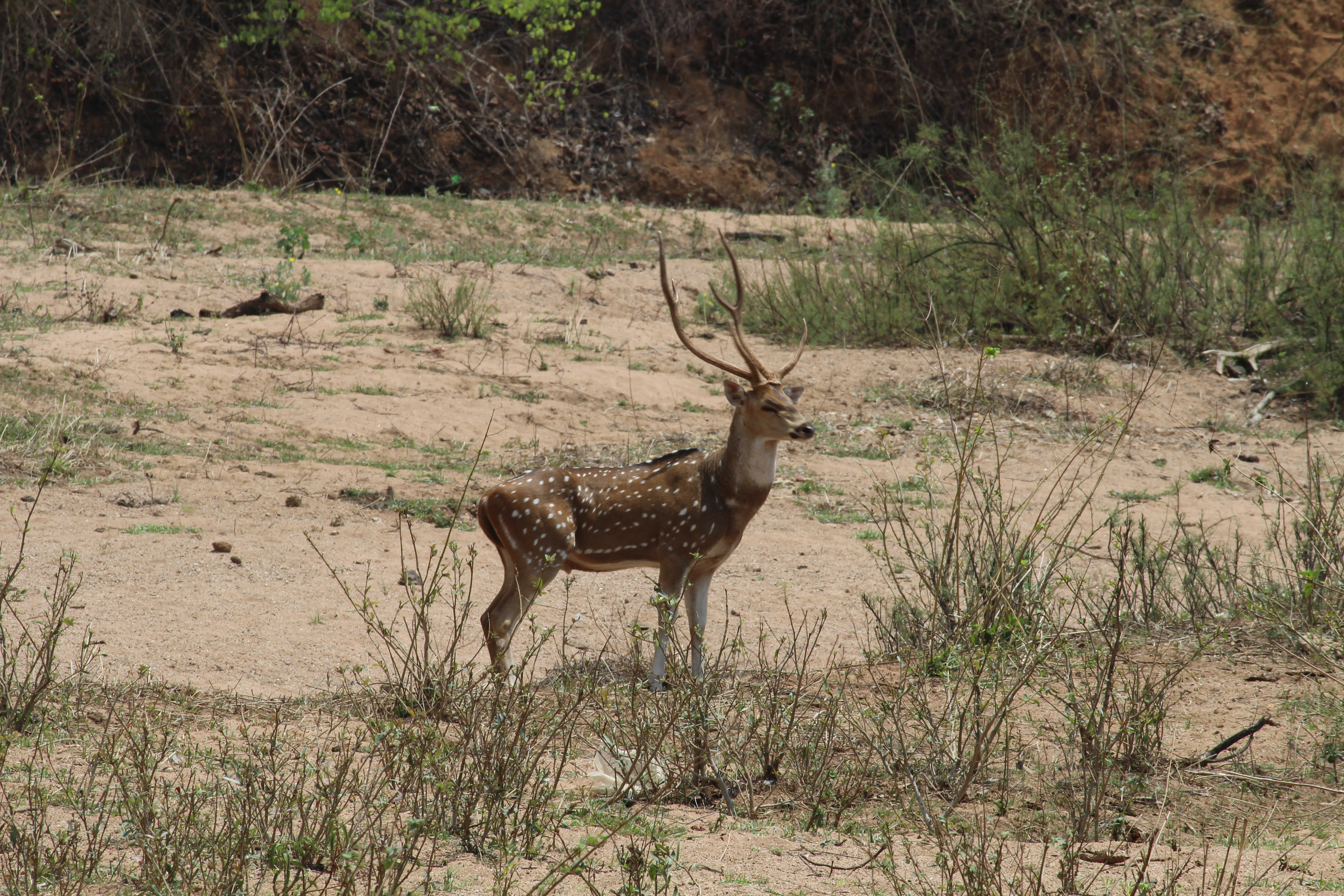
A spotted deer in Sitanadi Wildlife Sanctuary

Animals in the sanctuary include tiger, leopard, flying squirrel, golden jackal, four-horned antelope, chinkara, blackbuck, jungle cat, barking deer, porcupine, gaur, striped hyena, sloth bear, dhole, chital, sambar deer, nilgai, wild boar, cobra, python among many others.
