= Bhairamgarh Wildlife Sanctuary =

Protected area in Chhattisgarh, India

- IUCN category IV (habitat/species management area)
- Location within Chhattisgarh Location within India
- Interactive map of Bhairamgarh Wildlife Sanctuary
- Nearest city: Jagdalpur
- Coordinates: 19°5′56.8″N 80°56′21.8″E
- Area: 138.95 km^{2} (53.65 sq mi)
- Established: 1983

Bhairamgarh Wildlife Sanctuary is a protected area and wildlife sanctuary located in Bijapur district of the Indian state of Chhattisgarh.

== Description ==
The sanctuary covers an area of 138.95 km^{2} (53.65 sq mi) and was declared as a protected area in 1983.

== Flora and fauna ==
The protected area consists of tropical dry deciduous mixed forests. Major fauna include sambar deer, gaur, barking deer, sloth bear, striped hyena, wild boar, jungle cat, grey wolf, wild dog, indian fox, asiatic jackal, spotted deer, indian gazelle, chausingha, and nilgai. avifauna include barred owlet, brown fish owl, eurasian eagle owl, red jungle fowl, peafowl, indian pitta, paradise flycatcher, and chestnut-shouldered petronia.
