= Pamed Wildlife Sanctuary =

- IUCN category IV (habitat/species management area)
- Location within Chhattisgarh Location within India
- Interactive map of Pamed Wildlife Sanctuary
- Nearest city: Kirandul
- Coordinates: 18°19′N 80°50′E
- Area: 262.12 km^{2} (101.21 sq mi)
- Established: 1985

Pamed Wildlife Sanctuary is a protected area and wildlife sanctuary located in Bijapur district of the Indian state of Chhattisgarh.

== Description ==
The sanctuary covers an area of 262.12 km^{2} (101.21 sq mi) and was declared as a protected area in 1985.

== Flora and fauna ==
The protected area consists of a mixture of moist and dry tropical deciduous forests. Major fauna include sambar deer, gaur, barking deer, sloth bear, wild boar, Indian jackal, striped hyena, and Indian wild buffalo. Major avifauna include darters, wood peckers, Indian peafowl, jungle fowl, green pigeons, quails, and parrots.
