= Badalkhol Wildlife Sanctuary =

Protected area in Chhattisgarh, India

- IUCN category IV (habitat/species management area)
- Location within Chhattisgarh Location within India
- Interactive map of Badalkhol Wildlife Sanctuary
- Location: Jashpur district, Chhattisgarh
- Nearest city: Jashpur Nagar
- Coordinates: 22.96°N 83.92°E
- Area: 104.45 km^{2} (40.33 sq mi)
- Established: 1975

Badalkhol Wildlife Sanctuary is a protected area and wildlife sanctuary located in Jashpur district of the Indian state of Chhattisgarh.

== Description ==
The sanctuary covers an area of 104.45 km^{2} (40.33 sq mi) and lies on the banks of the Eib and Dorki rivers. It was the erstwhile hunting grounds of the Maharaja of Jashpur and was declared as a protected area in 1976.

== Flora and fauna ==
The protected area consists of a mixture of moist and dry tropical deciduous forests. Major fauna include Indian elephant, Bengal tiger, leopard, jungle cat, Indian wolf, Indian wild dog, wild boar, striped hyena, sloth bear, Indian fox, Asiatic jackal, spotted deer, barking deer, Indian gazelle, chausingha, nilgai, and sambar deer. Avifauna include barred owlet, brown fish owl, eurasian eagle owl, red jungle fowl, Indian peafowl, Indian pitta, paradise flycatcher, and chestnut-shouldered petronia. The park is also host to reptiles such as common krait, cat snake, rat snake, snake eyed lacerta, grass skink, fan throated lizard, and rock agama.
