= List of protected areas of Tamil Nadu =

Protected areas of Tamil Nadu cover an area of 3,305 km^{2} (1,276 sq mi), constituting 2.54% of the geographic area and 15% of the 22,643 km^{2} (8,743 sq mi) recorded forest area of the state of Tamil Nadu in South India. It ranks 14th among all the states and union territories of India in terms of total protected area.

Protected areas in South India were created from private hunting grounds of the erstwhile Maharajas of the princely states. Mudumalai National Park was established in 1940 and was the first modern wildlife sanctuary in South India. The protected areas are administered by the Ministry of Environment and Forests of Government of India and the Tamil Nadu Forest Department.

== Biosphere reserves ==
Biosphere Reserves

There are three Biosphere Reserves in Tamil Nadu.

Name	District	Area	Established
Gulf of Mannar	Ramanathapuram, Thoothukudi	10,500 km^{2} (4,100 sq mi)	1989
Nilgiris	Nilgiris	5,520 km^{2} (2,130 sq mi)	1986
Agasthyamalai	Kanyakumari, Tirunelveli	3,500.36 km^{2} (1,351.50 sq mi)	2001

== National parks ==
National Parks

Tamil Nadu has five National Parks covering 307.84 km^{2} (118.86 sq mi).

Name	District	Area	Established
Anamalai	Coimbatore, Tiruppur	117.1 km^{2} (45.2 sq mi)	1989
Mudumalai	Nilgiris	103.24 km^{2} (39.86 sq mi)	1990
Mukurthi	Nilgiris	78.46 km^{2} (30.29 sq mi)	1982
Gulf of Mannar	Ramanathapuram	6.23 km^{2} (2.41 sq mi)	1980
Guindy	Chennai	2.82 km^{2} (1.09 sq mi)	1976

== Wildlife sanctuaries ==
Tamil Nadu has 18 wildlife sanctuaries.

Name	District	Area	Established
Anamalai	Coimbatore, Tiruppur	841.49 km^{2} (324.90 sq mi)	1976
Cauvery North	Dharmapuri, Krishnagiri	504.34 km^{2} (194.73 sq mi)	2015
Cauvery South	Dharmapuri, Krishnagiri	686.4 km^{2} (265.0 sq mi)	2022
Gangaikondan	Tirunelveli	288.4 km^{2} (111.4 sq mi)	2013
Grizzled Squirrel	Virudhunagar	485 km^{2} (187 sq mi)	1988
Kadavur	Dindigul, Karur	118.06 km^{2} (45.58 sq mi)	2022
Kalakkad	Tirunelveli	223.58 km^{2} (86.32 sq mi)	1962
Kanyakumari	Kanyakumari	457.78 km^{2} (176.75 sq mi)	2008
Megamalai	Madurai, Theni	269.1 km^{2} (103.9 sq mi)	2009
Mudumalai	Nilgiris	217.76 km^{2} (84.08 sq mi)	1940
Kodaikanal	Dindigul	608.95 km^{2} (235.12 sq mi)	2008
Mundanthurai	Tirunelveli	282.08 km^{2} (108.91 sq mi)	1962
Point Calimere	Nagapattinam, Thanjavur, Tiruvarur	124.07 km^{2} (47.90 sq mi)	1967
Sathyamangalam	Erode	1,411.6 km^{2} (545.0 sq mi)	2008
Periyar	Erode	805.67 km^{2} (311.07 sq mi)	2023
Tirunelveli	Tirunelveli	356.73 km^{2} (137.73 sq mi)	2015
Vallanadu	Thoothukudi	16.41 km^{2} (6.34 sq mi)	1987

== Elephant reserves ==
Elephant reserves

There are five declared elephant sanctuaries in Tamil Nadu as per Project Elephant.

Name	District	Area	Established
Agasthyamalai	Kanyakumari, Tirunelveli	1,197.48 km^{2} (462.35 sq mi)	2022
Anamalai	Coimbatore, Tiruppur	1,457 km^{2} (563 sq mi)	2003
Coimbatore	Coimbatore, Tiruppur, Erode	566 km^{2} (219 sq mi)	2003
Nilgiris	Nilgiris	4,663 km^{2} (1,800 sq mi)	2003
Srivilliputtur	Madurai, virudhunagar Theni	1,249 km^{2} (482 sq mi)	2003

== Tiger reserves ==
Tiger reserves

Tamil Nadu participates in Project Tiger and has five declared tiger reserves.

Name	District	Area	Established
Anamalai Tiger Reserve	Coimbatore, Tiruppur	958.59 km^{2} (370.11 sq mi)	2008
Kalakkad-Mundanthurai	Tirunelveli	895 km^{2} (346 sq mi)	1988
Mudumalai	Nilgiris	367.59 km^{2} (141.93 sq mi)	2007
Sathyamangalam	Erode	1,408.6 km^{2} (543.9 sq mi)	2011
Megamalai	Madurai, Theni	1,016.57 km^{2} (392.50 sq mi)	2021

== Bird sanctuaries ==
There are seventeen declared bird sanctuaries in Tamil Nadu.

Name	District	Area	Established
Chitrangudi	Ramanathapuram	.48 km^{2} (0.19 sq mi)	1989
Kallaperambur	Thanjavur	.64 km^{2} (0.25 sq mi)	2015
Kanjirankulam	Ramanathapuram	1.04 km^{2} (0.40 sq mi)	1989
Karaivetti	Ariyalur	4.54 km^{2} (1.75 sq mi)	1989
Karikili	Chengalpattu	0.612 km^{2} (0.236 sq mi)	1988
Kazhuveli	Villupuram	51.56 km^{2} (19.91 sq mi)	2021
Koothankulam	Tirunelveli	1.2933 km^{2} (0.4993 sq mi)	1994
Melaselvanur–Kilaselvanur	Ramanathapuram	5.93 km^{2} (2.29 sq mi)	1998
Nanjarayan Tank	Tiruppur	1.26 km^{2} (0.49 sq mi)	2022
Point Calimere	Nagapattinam	17.26 km^{2} (6.66 sq mi)	1987
Pulicat	Thiruvallur	461.02 km^{2} (178.00 sq mi)	1976
Suchindram Theroor	Kanyakumari	0.94 km^{2} (0.36 sq mi)	2002
Udayamarthandapuram	Thiruvarur	0.45 km^{2} (0.17 sq mi)	1999
Vaduvoor	Thiruvarur	1.28 km^{2} (0.49 sq mi)	1999
Vedanthangal	Chengalpattu	0.3 km^{2} (0.12 sq mi)	1936
Vellode	Erode	0.772 km^{2} (0.298 sq mi)	1996
Vettangudi	Sivagangai	0.344 km^{2} (0.133 sq mi)	1977
Viralimalai	Tiruchirappalli		

== Zoos, reserves and animal farms ==
There is one conservation reserve at Tiruvidaimarudur in Thanjavur district. There are two zoos recognised by the Central Zoo Authority of India namely Arignar Anna Zoological Park and Madras Crocodile Bank Trust, both located in Chennai. The state has other smaller zoos run by local administrative bodies such as Coimbatore Zoo in Coimbatore, Amirthi Zoological Park in Vellore, Kurumpampatti Wildlife Park in Salem, Yercaud Deer Park in Yercaud, Mukkombu Deer Park in Tiruchirapalli and Ooty Deer Park in Nilgiris.

There are five crocodile farms located at Amaravati in Coimbatore district, Hogenakkal in Dharmapuri district, Kurumbapatti in Salem district, Madras Crocodile Bank Trust in Chennai and Sathanur in Tiruvannamalai district.
