= Squirrel poaching =

Illegal hunting of squirrels

Squirrel poaching includes any poaching of any squirrel.

Flying squirrels are native to Florida and popular as pets. There is an illegal wildlife trade in flying squirrels. In October 2020 the Florida Fish and Wildlife Conservation Commission disrupted a major flying squirrel poaching and smuggling operation.

The Caucasian squirrel is a victim of poaching in Greece.

Poaching disturbs the squirrel behavior of distributing seeds in tropical forests in Panama.

Poaching is among the disturbances faced by the Grizzled giant squirrel in the Grizzled Squirrel Wildlife Sanctuary in South India.

The Indian giant squirrel faces poaching in the Dalma Wildlife Sanctuary in Jharkhand, India.
