= Melagiri =

- Reserve forest
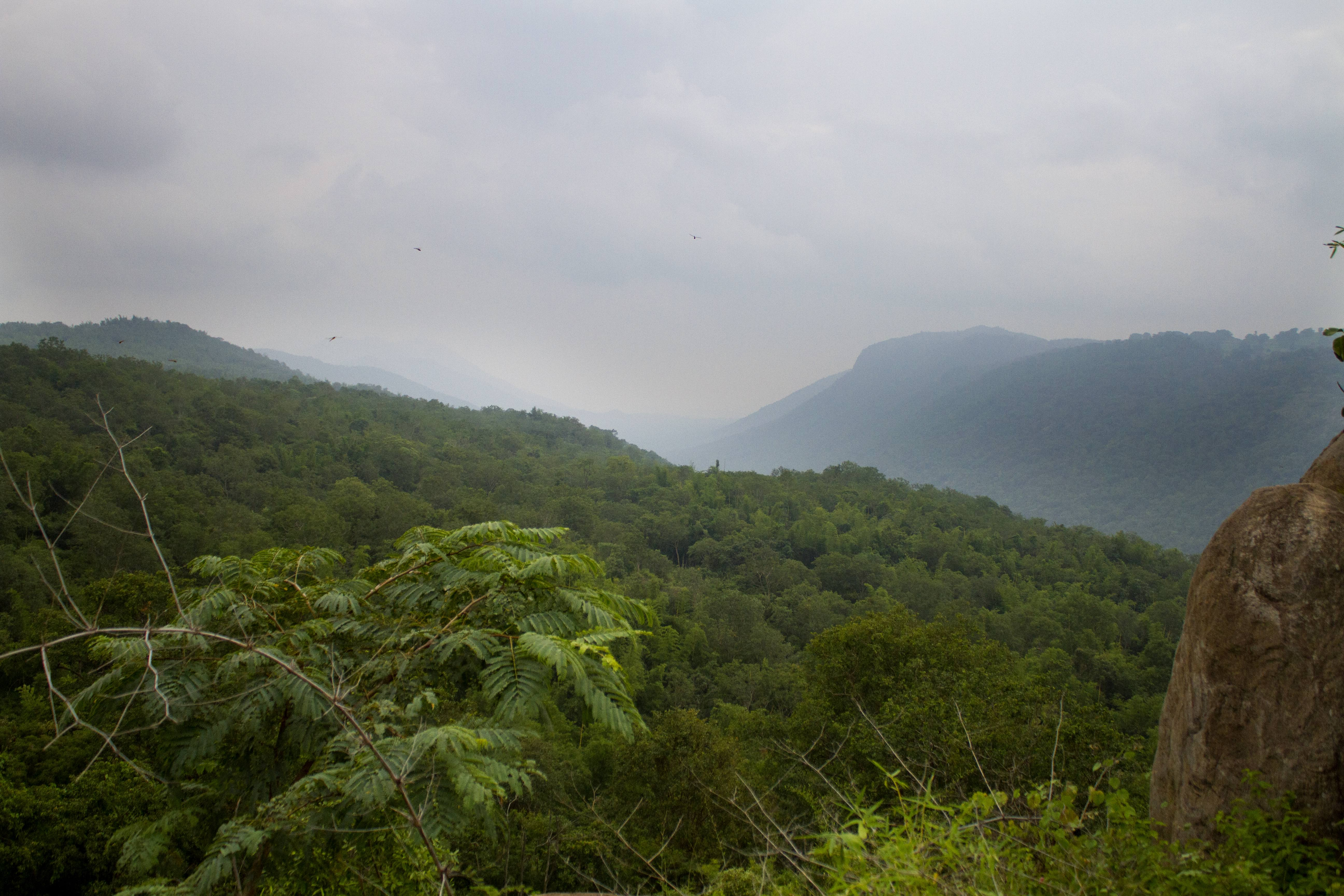
- Spider Valley, Melagiri

- Location in Tamil Nadu, India
- Coordinates: 12°12′33″N 77°49′25″E
- Country: India
- State: Tamil Nadu
- District: Krishnagiri and Dharmapuri

Area
  - Total: 1,295 km^{2} (500 sq mi)
- Elevation: 1,395 m (4,577 ft)

Languages
  - Official: Tamil
- Time zone: UTC+5:30 (IST)
- Nearest Place: Denkanikottai, Dharmapuri,(palacode)

The Melagiris are a range of hills on the Eastern Ghats, bound by the river Cauvery on the west. Melagiri contain an expanse of 1295 km^{2} of dry deciduous and semi-evergreen forests. It is an elephant country and contains two traditional elephant corridors. With the Bannerghatta National Park in the North east and Cauvery Wildlife Sanctuary in the south, the forest range stretches to sanctuaries of BR Hills and Sathyamangala and joins the tiger reserves of Nilgiri Biosphere. As the meeting point of the Western Ghats and Eastern Ghats, these forests form a vital link in the elephant corridors of South India, connecting the Bannerghatta National Park and the River Cauvery. It borders some of the prominent tiger sanctuaries of the south.

Part of Melagiri hills ranges were declared as a Cauvery North Wildlife Sanctuary with effect from 12 March 2014 by the Government of Tamil Nadu as per the Wildlife Protection Act, 1972.

== Geography ==
Melagiri hills lie between the Dharmapuri and Krishnagiri Districts of Tamil Nadu on one side and bordered by Cauvery on the Karnataka side. Forest covered hills and valleys are the predominant landscape, with the highest peak of Gutherayan rising up to 1,390 meters (4,560 ft) and lowest 635 meters (2,083 ft). The forests are largely dry deciduous with some stretches of shola forests on the slopes of Gutherayan peak. The Melagiri hills receive a minimum of 700mm and maximum of 900mm of rainfall annually.

Water sources: Cauvery, Dodahalla, Hebbahalla, Chinnar, Ponnaiar, Anaibiddahalla rivers

== Flora ==
The Melagiri hills host mixed vegetation types such as thorn scrub, dry tropical riverine, dry deciduous, mixed deciduous, dry evergreen, and semi evergreen. The forests of the hill harbor many rare plants and trees such as giant Mangifera indica, Garcinia gummi-gutta, wild Balsam, wild jack, etc. Endangered species such as Shorea roxburghii also occur in the division. Significant trees such as old growth Mutti (Terminalia arjuna), Hardwickia binata, Ippe (Madhuca longifolia), Diospyros malabarica etc. occur here.

== Fauna ==
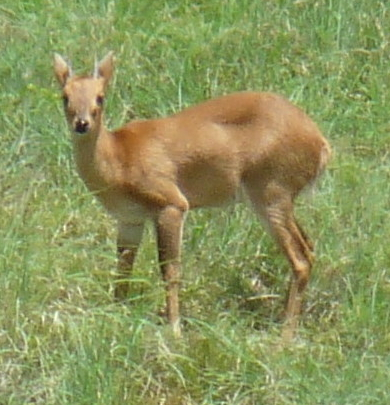
Four horned antelope at Rasimanal, Melagiri

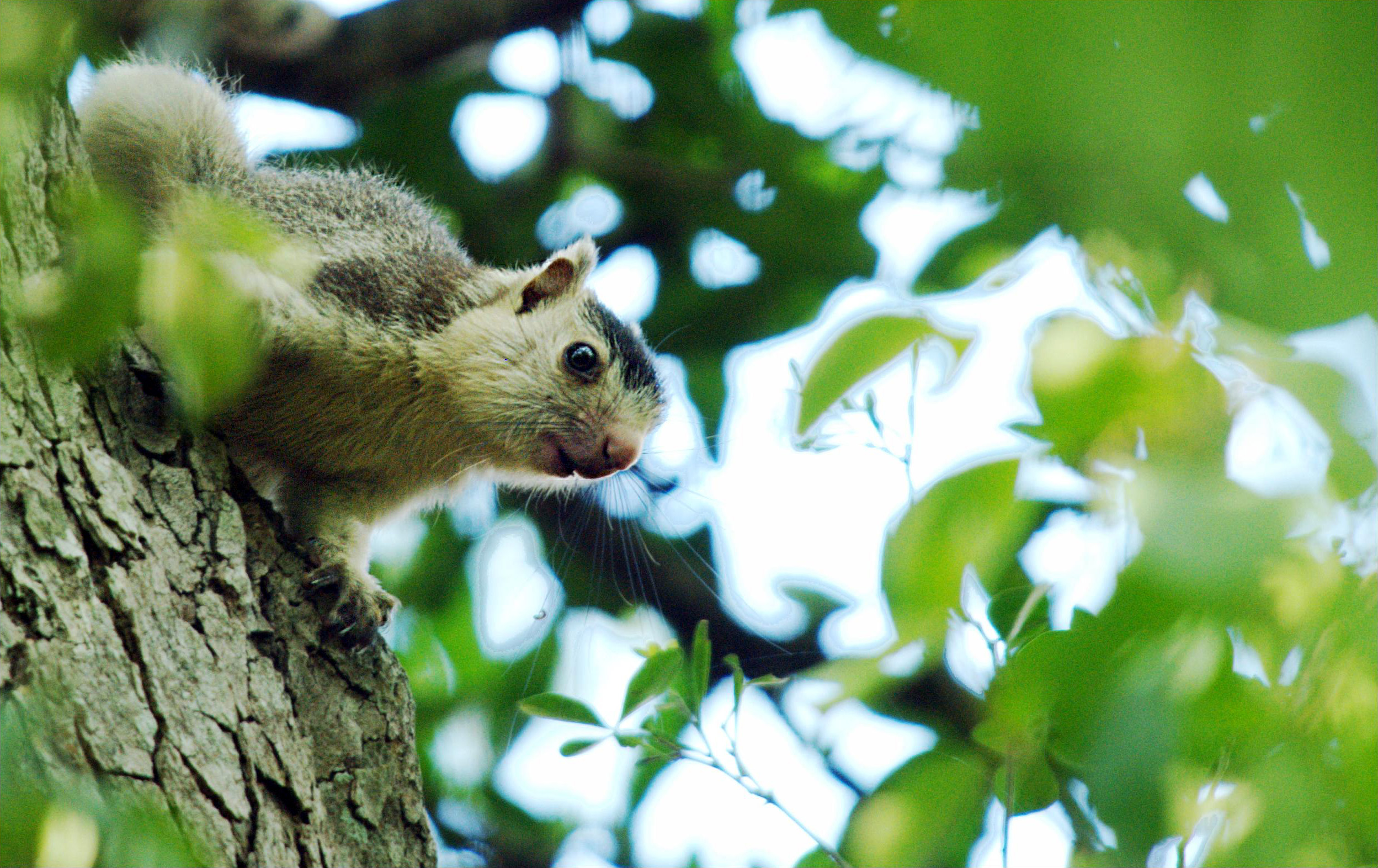
Grizzled giant squirrel at Melagiri

The area is home to the Asian elephant, leopard, dhole, sloth bear, marsh crocodile, golden jackal and prey species such as chital, gaur, sambar, grizzled giant squirrel, four-horned antelope and smooth-coated otter. The area is also home to the last few remaining gray langur in the Hosur Forest Division.

=== Birds ===
Grey junglefowl, grey-fronted green pigeon, crested honey buzzard, Egyptian vulture, lesser fish eagle, brown fish owl, changeable hawk eagle, Indian peafowl, osprey and plain flowerpecker inhabit the hills.

=== Reptiles and amphibians ===
Indian cobra, Indian python, Russell's viper, Dhaman rat snake, keelback water snake and rare snakes like the racer Coluber bholanathi, the marsh crocodile, lacertid lizard Ophisops leschenaultii, Indian chameleon, Bengal monitor and the Indian star tortoise occur here. Nearly 20 species of frogs and toads occur here including the rare rock-dwelling toad Bufo hololius.

== Conflicts and threats ==
- Elephant areas are being exploited for bamboo and leased for NTFP collection. Thus, during the migration of elephants, cause contact with human habitations and farms are often damaged. Wild Boars too are a major concern in crop-damage.
- Poaching
- Habitat fragmentation due to settlements
- Fuel wood collection, cattle grazing, livestock penning and illegal felling
- Forest fire
- Increased biotic pressure due to industrial expansion around the division
- Cattle competing with elephants for water and the usage of water by the local livestock dries up the waterholes.
- Lantana, an invasive species with thorny bushes, is not eaten by any of the herbivores and its rapid spread has caused other species of fauna too to vanish. Rapid spread of Chromolaena odorata has severely damaged the bio-diversity, and typical landscapes of this beautiful jungle is making way for this invasive weed.
