= Thanthai Periyar Wildlife Sanctuary =

Wildlife Sanctuary in Tamil Nadu, India

- IUCN category IV (habitat/species management area)
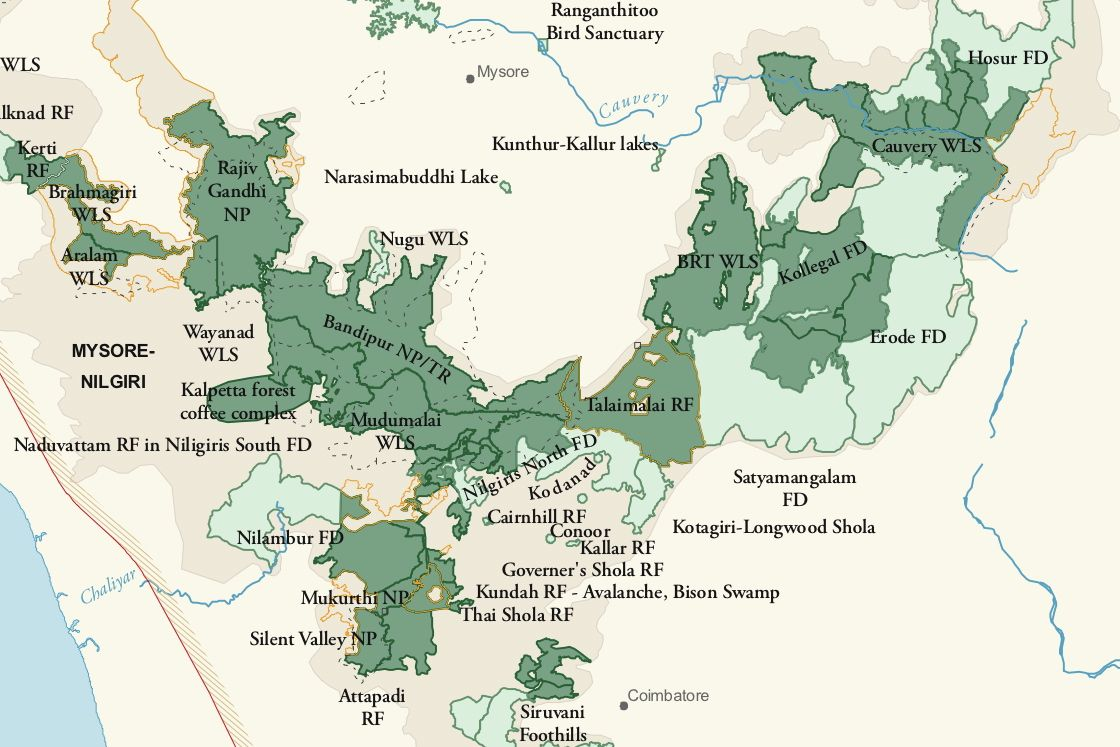
- Map of Nilgiris Biosphere Reserve where the sanctuary is located

- Location within Tamil Nadu Location within India
- Interactive map of Thanthai Periyar Wildlife Sanctuary
- Nearest city: Gobichettipalayam
- Coordinates: 11°34′23″N 77°30′37″E
- Area: 805.67 km^{2} (311.07 sq mi)
- Established: 2023
- Governing body: Tamil Nadu Forest Department

Thanthai Periyar Wildlife Sanctuary is a proposed protected area located along the area straddling both the Western Ghats and Eastern Ghats in the Erode District of the Indian state of Tamil Nadu. The sanctuary was notified by Government of Tamil Nadu in March 2023 and will become the 18th wildlife sanctuary in the state. Covering an area of 801.15 km^{2} (309.33 mi^{2}), the sanctuary spans parts of Gobichettipalayam and Anthiyur taluks in Western Tamil Nadu.

The proposed sanctuary serves as a critical ecological corridor, linking the Nilgiris Biosphere Reserve with Cauvery South Wildlife Sanctuary, thereby facilitating the safe movement of wildlife such as elephants and tigers. Additionally, the sanctuary connects to the Kollegal forests in the neighboring state of Karnataka and forms a key junction where the Eastern and Western Ghats merge, enhancing regional biodiversity and ecological integrity.

== History ==
The creation of the Thanthai Periyar Wildlife sanctuary was announced by finance Minister Palanivel Thiagarajan in the 2023 Tamil Nadu State budget. In January 30, 2024, the sanctuary was notified by the government of tamil nadu with a designated area of 80,114.80 hectares. The total reserve forest area in the hill region spans 80,567.76 hectares. However, certain exclusions were made for six tribal habitations, encompassing 342.12 hectares, and roads, covering 110.84 hectares. Consequently, a total of 80,114.80 hectares were declared as a wildlife sanctuary.

== See also ==
List of wildlife sanctuaries of India
