= Viralimalai Bird Sanctuary =

Wildlife Sanctuary in Tamil Nadu, India

- Location within Tamil Nadu
- Coordinates: 10°36′11″N 78°32′44″E
- Governing body: Tamil Nadu Forest Department

Viralimalai Bird Sanctuary is a protected area and bird sanctuary located in Tiruchirappalli district of the Indian state of Tamil Nadu. The sanctuary was established to protect the Indian peafowl, the national bird of India.
