= Kallaperambur Lake Bird Sanctuary =

Wildlife Sanctuary in Tamil Nadu, India

- Location within Tamil Nadu Location within India
- Interactive map of Kallaperambur Lake Bird Sanctuary
- Coordinates: 10°47′56″N 79°01′33″E
- Area: 0.64 km^{2} (0.25 sq mi)
- Established: 2015
- Governing body: Tamil Nadu Forest Department

Kallaperambur Lake Bird Sanctuary is a protected area and bird sanctuary located in Thanjavur of the Indian state of Tamil Nadu. The sanctuary covers an area of 0.64 km^{2} (0.25 sq mi) and was notified in 2015.
