= Cauvery South Wildlife Sanctuary =

Wildlife Sanctuary in Tamil Nadu, India

- IUCN category IV (habitat/species management area)
- Location within Tamil Nadu Location within India
- Interactive map of Cauvery South Wildlife Sanctuary
- Coordinates: 12°20′39″N 78°01′02″E
- Area: 686.4 km^{2} (265.0 sq mi)
- Established: 2022
- Governing body: Tamil Nadu Forest Department

Cauvery South Wildlife Sanctuary is a protected area located in Dharmapuri and Krishnagiri of the Indian state of Tamil Nadu. The sanctuary covers an area of 686.4 km^{2} (265.0 sq mi) and was notified in 2022.

== Geography ==
The sanctuary connects the Cauvery North Wildlife Sanctuary of Tamil Nadu with the Cauvery Wildlife Sanctuary in Karnataka and forms a large, contiguous network of protected areas for wildlife. The Nandimangalam-Ulibanda Corridor and the Kovaipallam-Anebiddahalla Corridor which are one of the largest elephant corridors also fall in this area.

== Fauna ==
The sanctuary is home to 35 species of mammals and 238 species of birds. Major fauna includes Leith's soft shelled turtles, Smooth coated otters, marsh crocodile, Grizzled giant squirrel, Four-horned antelope, and Lesser Fish Eagle.
