= Melaselvanur-Kilaselvanur Bird Sanctuary =

Wildlife Sanctuary in Tamil Nadu, India

- IUCN category IV (habitat/species management area)
- Location within Tamil Nadu Location within India
- Interactive map of Melaselvanur-Kilaselvanur Bird Sanctuary
- Coordinates: 9°12′56″N 78°33′7″E
- Area: 5.93 km^{2} (2.29 sq mi)
- Established: 1998
- Governing body: Tamil Nadu Forest Department

Melaselvanur-Kilaselvanur Bird Sanctuary is a protected area and bird sanctuary located in Ramanathapuram district of the Indian state of Tamil Nadu. The sanctuary covers an area of 5.93 km^{2} (2.29 sq mi) and was notified in 1998.
