= Coimbatore Elephant Reserve =

Wildlife Sanctuary in Tamil Nadu, India

- Location within Tamil Nadu
- Coordinates: 10°52′12″N 76°51′36″E
- Area: 566 km^{2} (219 sq mi)
- Established: 2003
- Governing body: Tamil Nadu Forest Department

Coimbatore Elephant Reserve is a protected area located in Coimbatore, Tiruppur and Erode districts of the Indian state of Tamil Nadu. The reserve covers an area of 566 km^{2} (219 sq mi) and was notified in 2003 as a part of Project Elephant.
