= Kadavur Slender Loris Wildlife Sanctuary =

Wildlife Sanctuary in Tamil Nadu, India

Kadavur Wildlife Sanctuary
- IUCN category IV (habitat/species management area)
- Location within Tamil Nadu Location within India
- Interactive map of Kadavur Wildlife Sanctuary
- Coordinates: 10°37′28″N 78°10′59″E
- Area: 118.06 km^{2} (45.58 sq mi)
- Established: 2022
- Governing body: Tamil Nadu Forest Department

Kadavur Wildlife Sanctuary is a protected area located in Dindigul and Karur districts of the Indian state of Tamil Nadu. The sanctuary covers an area of 118.06 km^{2} (45.58 sq mi) and was notified in 2022. It was created specifically to protect slender loris.
