= Srivilliputhur-Megamalai Tiger Reserve =

Protected area in Tamil Nadu, India

Srivilliputhur-Megamalai Tiger Reserve is India's 51st tiger reserve and 5th tiger reserve of Tamil Nadu. It was formed by combining Grizzled Squirrel Wildlife Sanctuary and Megamalai Wildlife Sanctuary. On 8 February 2021, the Ministry of Environment, Forest and Climate Change gave notification of this new tiger reserve. On 6 April 2021, the Government of Tamil Nadu and forest department approved the creation of a new tiger reserve in Tamil Nadu and on 11 April 2021 a new tiger reserve was formed.

Tiger reserve area: 1016.57 km^{2}

Tiger reserve area: 1016.57 km^{2}

Core area : 641. 86 km^{2}

Buffer area: 374.70 km^{2}

It is mainly formed for connecting adjacent wild life sanctuaries such as Periyar sanctuary, Srivilliputhur Grizzled Squirrel Wildlife Sanctuary, Anamalai Wildlife Sanctuary, Kalakkad Mundanthurai Tiger Reserve, and Thenmala reserve forests which are being unconnected. It will act as a connecting bridge of all adjacent sanctuaries and also to make it as a contiguous corridor where big cats can thrive. These two sanctuaries (Megamalai Tiger Reserve and Grizzled Squirrel Wildlife Sanctuary) are acting as a buffer zones for all the above-mentioned sanctuaries until now. NTCA, which is the abbreviation of National Tiger Conservation Authority, has approved this new tiger reserve.

Though its areas are covers the Grizzled Squirrel Wildlife Sanctuary also for tiger protection. This Tiger Reserve also gives a buffer zone for the Periyar Wildlife Sanctuary, Grizzled Squirrel Wildlife Sanctuary. It also give a better connection for animals in that forest to move around freely from Periyar Tiger Reserve to Srivilliputhur Wildlife Sanctuary via Megamalai Forests. It also gives protection to the Vaigai River, which originates from Megamalai which gives protection from land encroaches and starts to flow again as a perennial river. Thus this new tiger reserve will help in transformation of Vaigai river to perennial river from non-perennial river.

Deputy director:

Thiru. P. Devaraj IFS - Srivilliputhur Division

Thiru. Anand IFS - Megamalai Division
