= Gangaikondan Spotted Deer Sanctuary =

Wildlife Sanctuary in Tamil Nadu, India

- IUCN category IV (habitat/species management area)
- Location within Tamil Nadu Location within India
- Interactive map of Gangaikondan Spotted Deer Sanctuary
- Coordinates: 8°49′37″N 77°45′34″E
- Area: 288.4 km^{2} (111.4 sq mi)
- Established: 2013
- Governing body: Tamil Nadu Forest Department

Gangaikondan Spotted Deer Sanctuary is a protected area located in Tirunelveli of the Indian state of Tamil Nadu. The sanctuary covers an area of 288.4 km^{2} (111.4 sq mi) and was notified in 2013.
