= Nellai Wildlife Sanctuary =

Indian wildlife sanctuary

Coordinates: 9°06′N 77°16′E

- IUCN category IV (habitat/species management area)
- Interactive map of Nellai Wildlife Sanctuary
- Location: Tirunelveli, Tamil Nadu, India
- Area: 356.73 km^{2} (137.73 sq mi)
- Established: 2014

Nellai Wildlife Sanctuary is situated in the Tirunelveli district of Tamil Nadu, India. It is most renowned for its famous mountains. Out of the 29 such mountain peaks, Sivagiri Mala is considered the highest point at 1,748 m and Ramakkalteri is a great tourist attraction. Nellai Wildlife Sanctuary earned the title of ‘wildlife sanctuary’ in the year 2015. It is a protected wildlife sanctuary.

== Location ==
It is spread across an area of 35,673.33 ha in the Tirunelveli forest division. It is stretched across various mountain ranges with dense forested areas. A few of the highest peaks include: Sivagiri Mala (431 m), Totti Mala (381 m), Aruitalai Mottai (231 m) and Kalli Mala (88 m). The board landscape of Nellai Wildlife Sanctuary shares boundaries with tiger and grizzled squirrel reserves.
