= Mammals of Sri Lanka (book) =

- Author: Asoka Yapa and Gamini Ratnavira
- Language: English
- Genre: Non-fiction
- Publisher: Field Ornithology Group of Sri Lanka
- Publication date: 7 December 2013
- Publication place: Sri Lanka
- Media type: Print (Hardback)
- Pages: 1012 pp
- ISBN: 978-955-8576-32-8

Mammals of Sri Lanka by written by Asoka Yapa and illustrated by Gamini Ratnavira is a zoology book about the mammalian species of Sri Lanka. This is the first complete zoological book about mammals in Sri Lanka in 80 years. The first Sri Lankan book on mammals dated back to 1935, when W.W.A Phillips wrote Manuals of The Mammals of Ceylon. After that, many journals and other minor works on the topic were published, but no fully detailed and fully photographed volumes.

Asoka Yapa is a Canadian resident who trained as a zoologist, was a science editor with Canadian Forest Service, and was also a key member of many departments in Canada related to wildlife. As stated in the book's introduction, he was influenced by the work of his friend Professor Sarath Kotagama, the leading ornithologist in Sri Lanka. Kotagama invited him to make a fully detailed book about Sri Lankan mammalian fauna and Yapa accepted. He visited Sri Lankan national parks for further investigation and used many resources from both Sri Lankan and overseas zoologists and wildlife experts to write the book.

The book describes all the mammalian species in Sri Lanka known to date, with over 125 species, both terrestrial and marine. The colored portraits were illustrated by Gamini Ratnavira, a popular Sri Lankan wildlife artist. The photographs were taken by numerous animal-lovers, and there is a unique collection of photographs featuring photos of very rare species for the first time.
