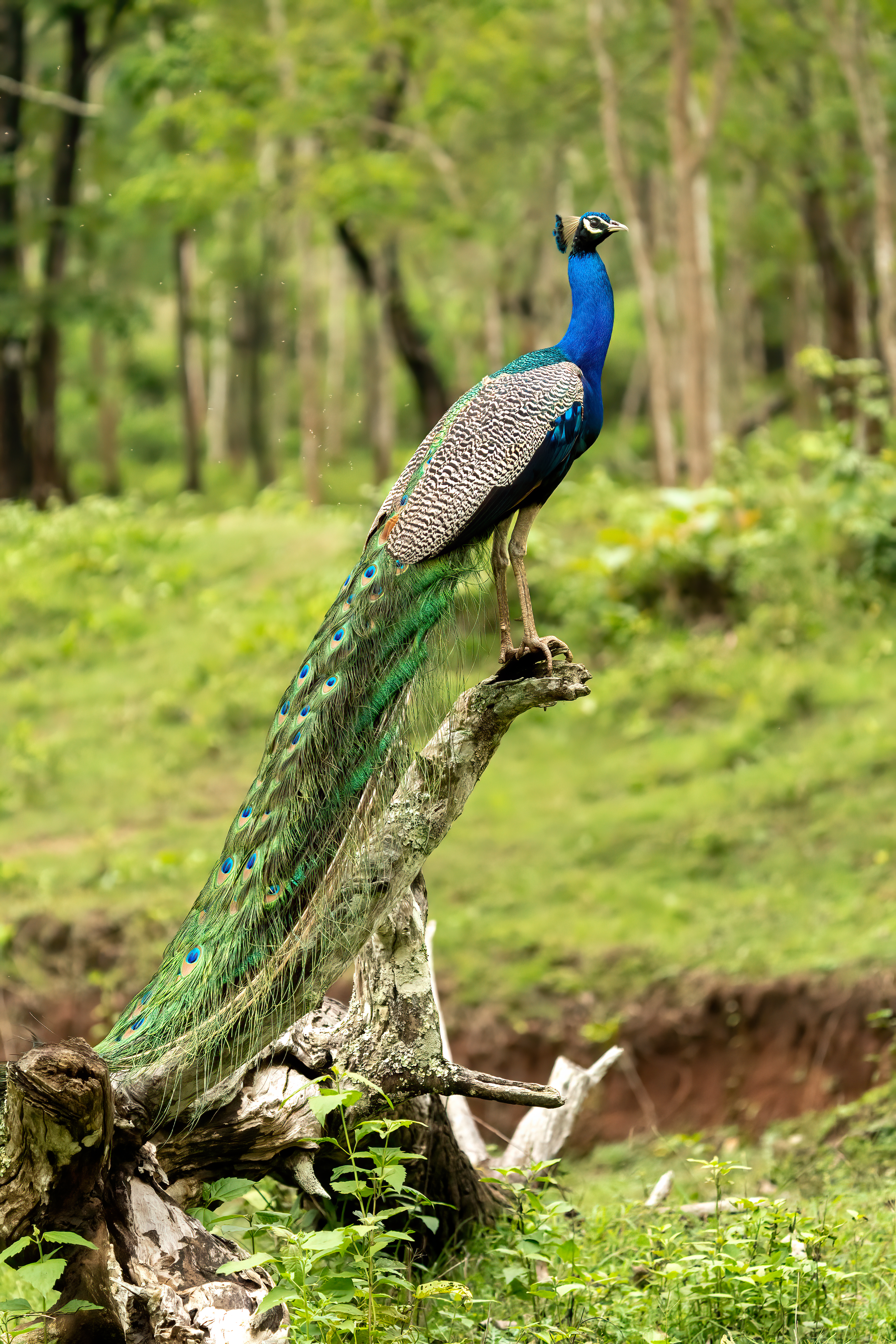
- Peacock in Nagarhole National Park Call of Indian peafowl
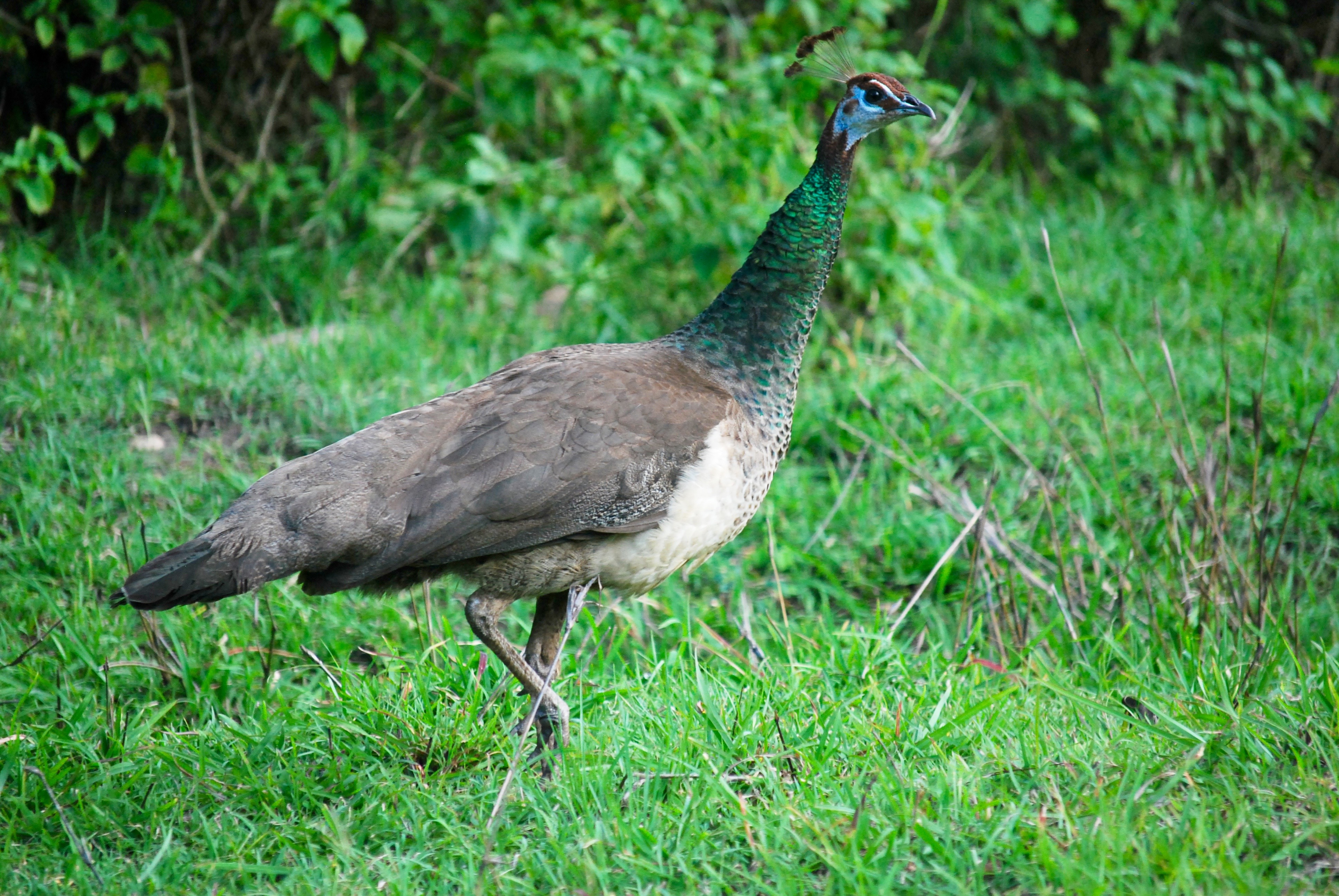
- Peahen in Bandipur National Park

Conservation status
- Least Concern (IUCN 3.1)

Scientific classification
- Kingdom: Animalia
- Phylum: Chordata
- Class: Aves
- Order: Galliformes
- Family: Phasianidae
- Genus: Pavo
- Species: P. cristatus

Binomial name
- Pavo cristatus Linnaeus, 1758
- Map showing native range

= Indian peafowl =

Species of bird

The Indian peafowl (Pavo cristatus), also known as the common peafowl, or blue peafowl, is a species of peafowl native to the Indian subcontinent. While it originated in the Indian subcontinent, it has since been introduced to many other parts of the world. Male peafowl are referred to as peacocks, and female peafowl are referred to as peahens, although both sexes are often referred to colloquially as a "peacock".

The Indian peafowl displays a marked form of sexual dimorphism. The brightly coloured male has a blue coloured head with a fan-shaped crest and is best known for his long train. The train is made up of elongated upper-tail covert feathers with colourful eyespots. These stiff feathers are raised into a fan and quivered in a display during courtship. The peahen is predominantly brown in colour, with a white face and iridescent green lower neck, and lacks the elaborate train. There are several colour mutations of the Indian peafowl including the leucistic white peafowl.

Despite the length and size of the covert feathers, the peacock is still capable of flight. The peafowl lives mainly on the ground in open forests or on cultivable lands where it forages for berries and grains, and also preys on snakes, lizards and small rodents. It makes loud calls, which makes it easier to detect, and are often used to indicate the presence of a predator in the forest areas. It forages on the ground in small groups and usually escapes on foot through undergrowth and avoids flying, though it flies into tall trees to roost.

The function of the Indian peacock's elaborate train has been debated for more than a century. In the 19th century, Charles Darwin found it a puzzle, hard to explain through ordinary natural selection. His later explanation, sexual selection, is widely but not universally accepted. In the 20th century, Amotz Zahavi argued that the train was a handicap, and that males were honestly signalling their fitness in proportion to the splendour of their trains. Despite extensive study, opinions remain divided on the mechanisms involved.

The Indian peafowl is listed as Least Concern on the IUCN Red List. It is the national bird of India and venerated in Hindu and Greek mythology.

== Taxonomy ==
The Indian peafowl was formally described in 1758 by the Swedish naturalist Carl Linnaeus in the tenth edition of his Systema Naturae under its current binomial name Pavo cristatus. The genus name Pavo is Latin for "peacock", which came from the Greek word taos derived from Persian tavus, which came from the Tamil word tokei. The specific epitet cristatus is Latin meaning "crested". The species is considered to be monotypic: no subspecies are recognised.

The earliest usage of the word peacock in written English was from the 14th century where Geoffrey Chaucer used the word in a simile "proud a pekok" in his poem Troilus and Criseyde. Various spelling variants included peacock, pacok, pecok, pekok, pokok, and pocok among others.

== Description ==
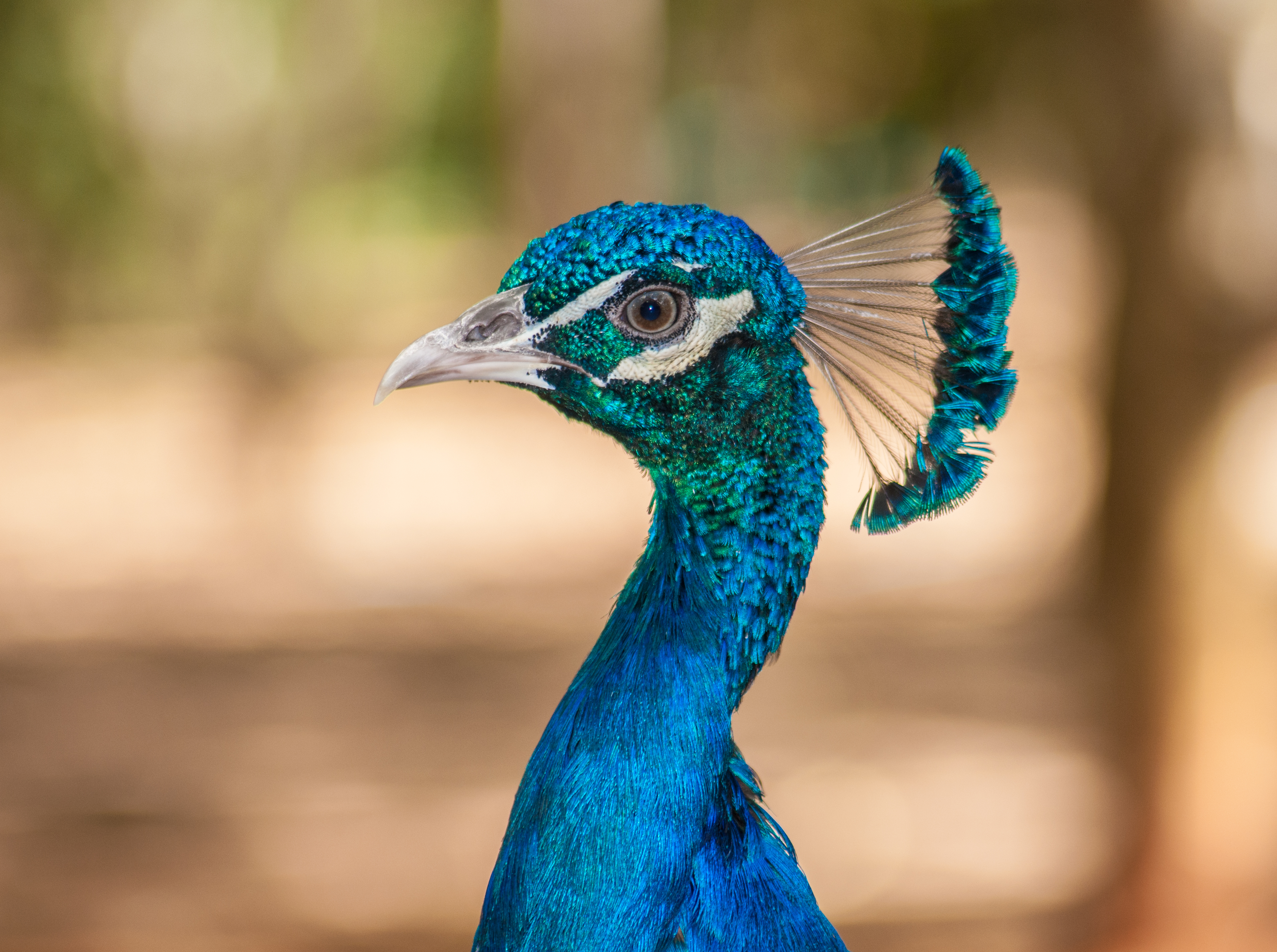
Head of a male Indian peafowl, showing his fan shaped crest

The Indian peafowl's size, color and shape of the crest make them easily identifiable within their native distribution range. It displays a marked form of sexual dimorphism. A male peafowl or peacock is a larger sized bird with an average bill to tail length of 100–120 cm (40–46 in) and as much as 200–230 cm (78–90 in) to the end of a fully grown train. It weighs 4.1–5.2 kg (9–11.5 lb) and is amongst the heaviest birds in Phasianidae. The male has a metallic blue crown with short and curled, blue-greenish head feathers. It has a fan-shaped crest with bare black shafts and tipped with bluish-green webbing. A white stripe above the eye and a crescent shaped white patch below the eye are formed by bare white skin. The lore, chin and throat are covered with greenish feathers. It has a long blue neck with scaly bronze-green feathers with black and copper markings in the back. The scapular region and wings are made of chestnut colored primary feathers with black secondaries. The tail is dark brown with glossy green chest, buff thighs, and blackish-brown abdomen and tail coverts.

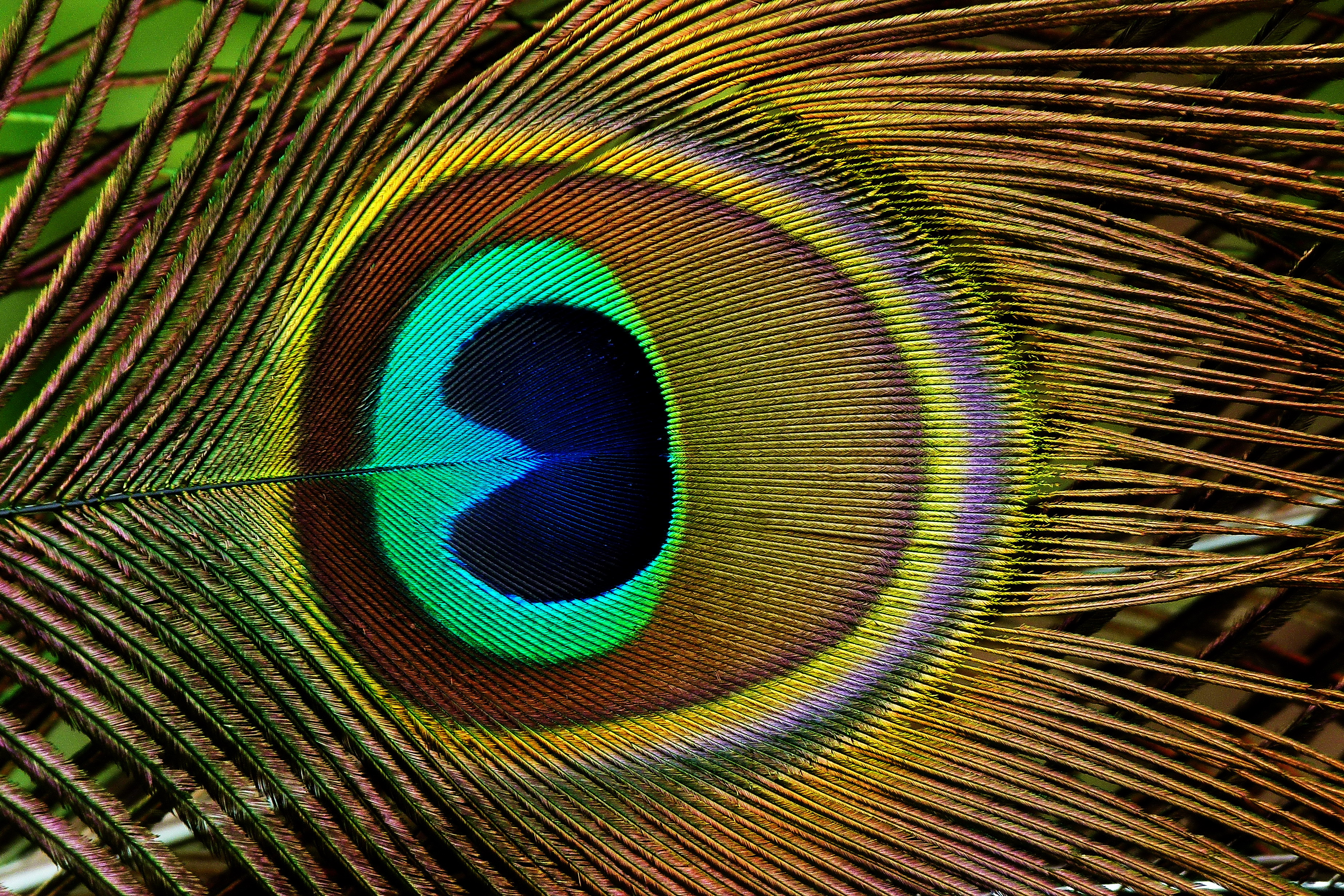
Close-up of the tail covert, showing the distinct eye-spot

The male is best known for his elongated train, which extend from the rump. The train is made up of elongated upper tail coverts, which are bronze-green train with the outermost and longer feathers ending up with an elaborate eye-spot. The eye-spots consist of a purplish-black, heart-shaped nucleus, enclosed by blue and an outer copper rim, which is surrounded by alternating green and bronze. A few of the outer feathers lack the spot and end in a crescent shaped black tip. The feathers of the train do not have colored pigments and the colorization is a result of the micro-structure of the feathers and the optical phenomena involved. The male has a spur on the leg above the hind toe. The train feathers and the tarsal spur of the male start developing only in the second year of its life. The trains are not fully developed until the age of four. The train feathers of the male Indian peafowl are also moulted every year, usually starting at the end of the monsoon in August or September and are fully developed by February to March. The moult of the flight feathers may be spread out across the year.

The females or peahens, are smaller at around 97 cm (38 in) in length and weigh 2.7–4.1 kg (6–9 lb). The peahen has a rufous-brown head with a crest, whose tips are chestnut colored and edged with green. The upper body is brownish with pale mottling and the primaries, secondaries and tail are dark brown. The lower neck is metallic green with dark brown breast feathers glossed with green and whitish underparts. Both sexes have dark brown eyes, brown colored beak and legs. Young males also resemble the females with chestnut colored primaries.

=== Mutations and hybrids ===
There are several colour mutations of the Indian peafowl that have become common in captive birds through selective breeding. The black-shouldered mutation was initially considered as a subspecies or even a separate species of the Indian peafowl (P. nigripennis). Charles Darwin presented firm evidence for it being a variety under domestication, which is now well established and accepted. It was important for Darwin to prove that it was a colour variation rather than a wild species as it was contrary to his theory of slow modification by natural selection in the wild. In this genetic variation, the adult male is melanistic with black wings. The young birds are creamy white with fulvous-tipped wings. The gene which produces melanism in the male, causes a dilution of colour in females, which have creamy white and brown markings. Other forms of mutations include the pied and white mutations, which are the result of allelic variation at specific loci.

Crosses between a male green peafowl (Pavo muticus) and a female Indian peafowl (P. cristatus) produce a stable hybrid called a "Spalding", named after Keith Spalding, a bird fancier from California. There can be outbreeding depression if birds of unknown pedigree are released into the wild, as the viability of such hybrids and their offspring is often reduced as per Haldane's rule.

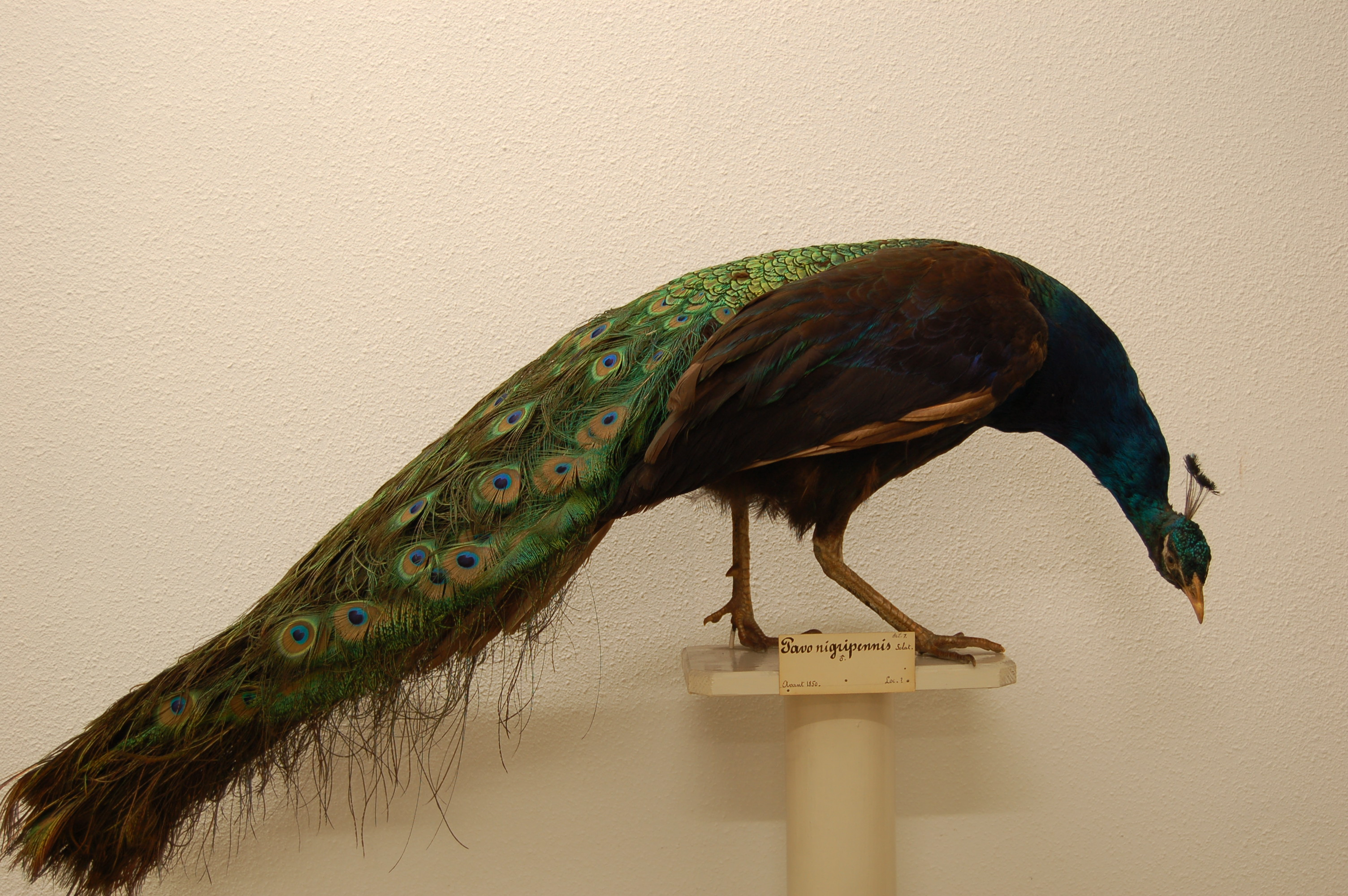
Melanistic black-shouldered Indian peafowl from Naturalis Biodiversity Center, Leiden

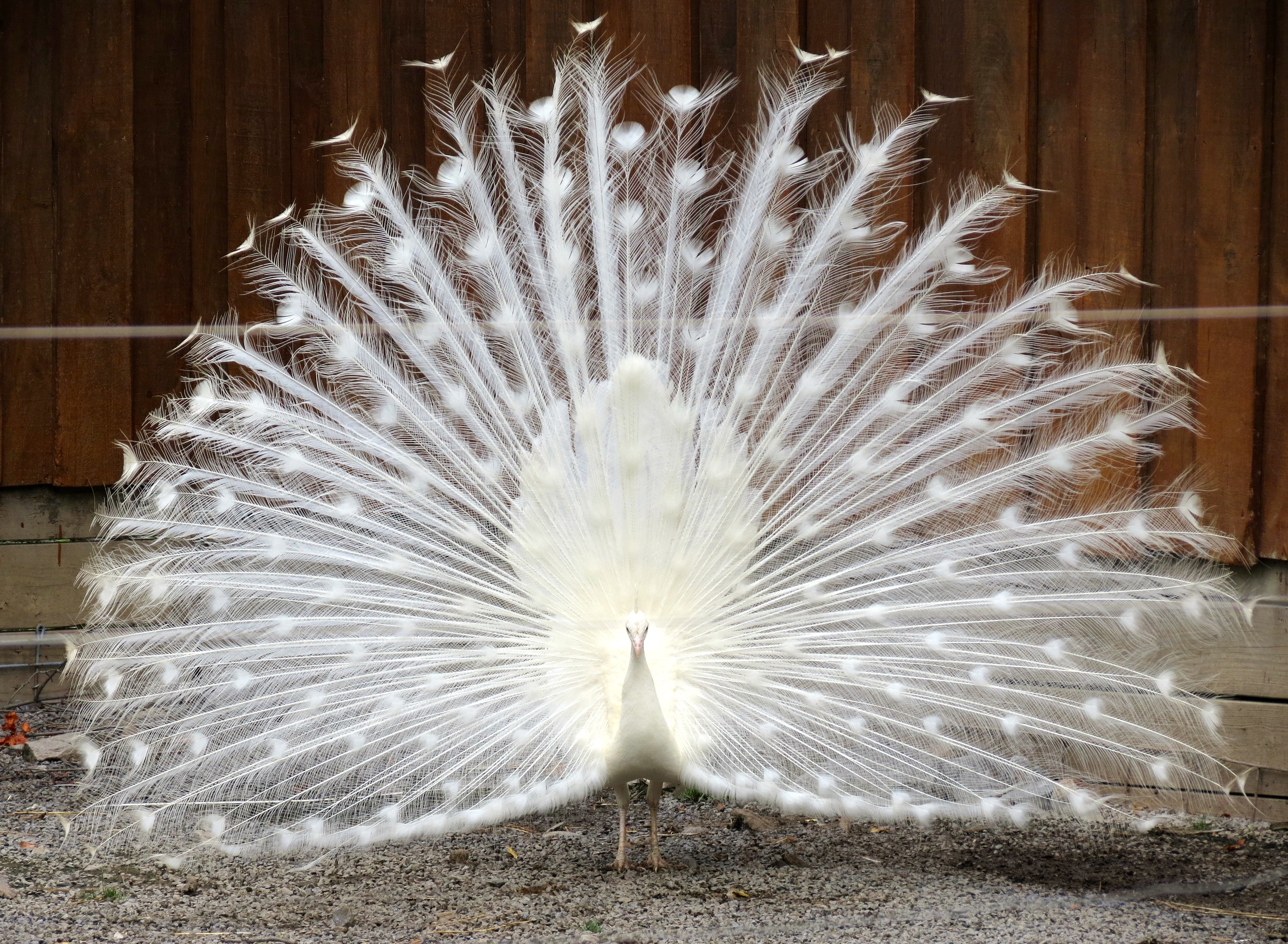
Displaying leucistic Indian peafowl

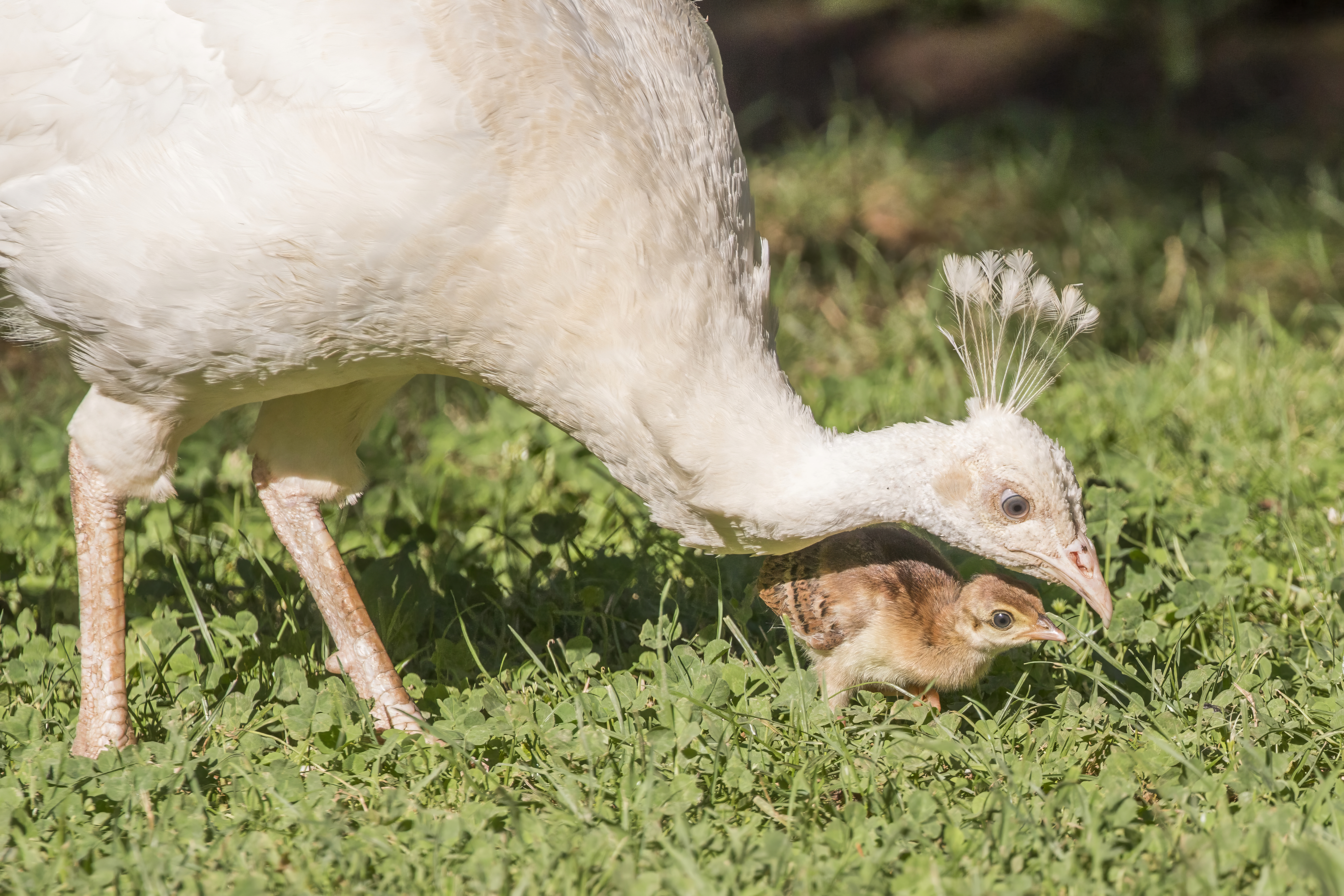
Leucistic female with chick, near Lake Ohrid, North Macedonia

== Distribution and habitat ==
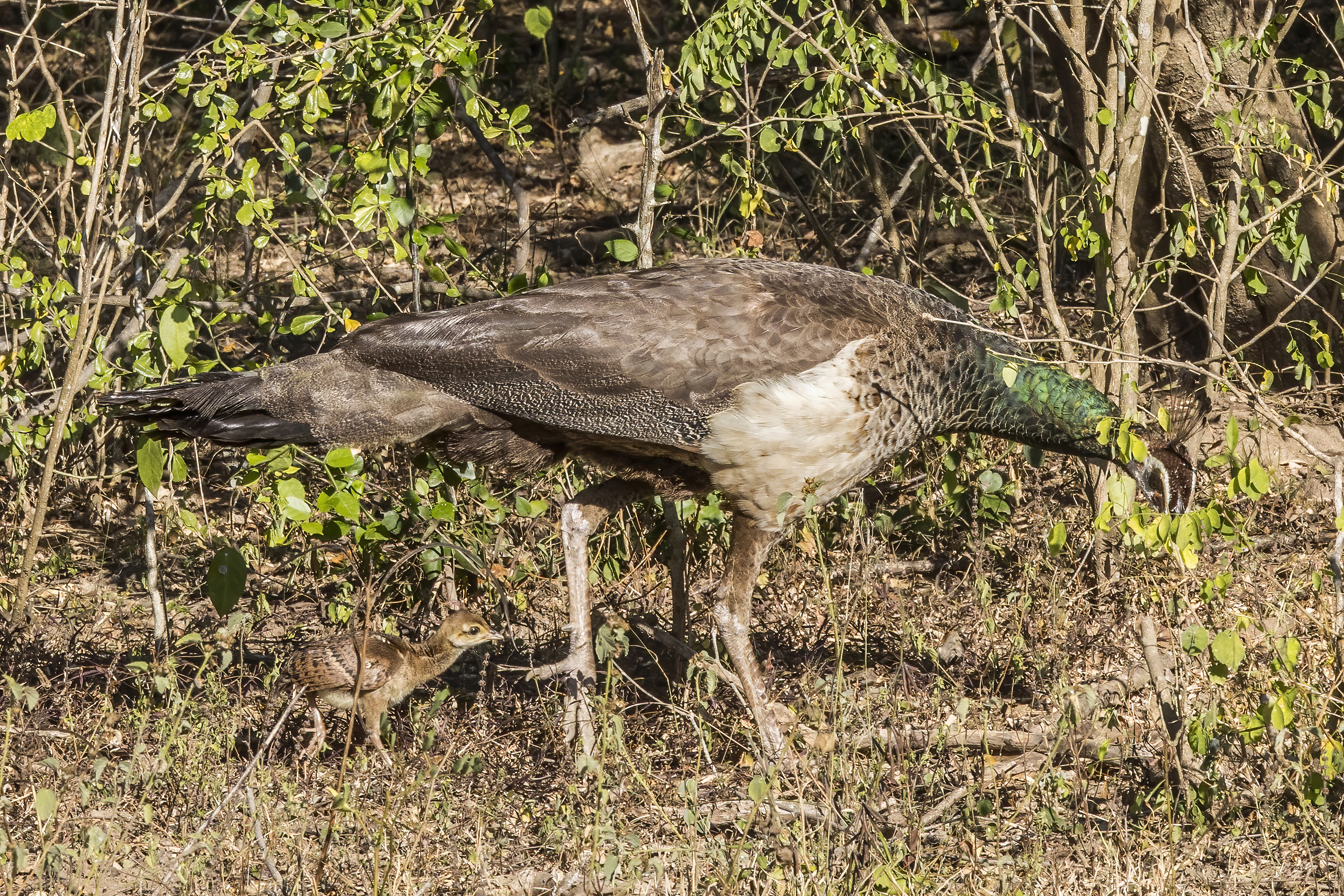
Female Indian peafowl in Yala National Park

The Indian peafowl is a resident breeder in the Indian subcontinent and is found across most of India and Sri Lanka. In India, it is found across the country from the Indus valley in the north-west to Assam in the north-east, and from Himalayas in the north to the southern tip, except for the marshlands of Sunderbans in East India. In India, it is found up to elevations of 5,000 ft (1,500 m) in the north and upto 6,000 ft (1,800 m) in the mountains of the south. In Sri Lanka, it largely inhabits the drier lowland areas. It is generally found in forests, small hills, and bushy areas near water sources. It also occupies cultivable lands and live in a semi-domesticated state in human habitations. The peafowl has since been introduced in many other parts of the world and has become feral in some areas. It was supposedly introduced into Europe by Alexander the Great, while the bird might have been introduced earlier and had reached Athens by 450 BCE.

The first whole-genome sequencing of the Indian peafowl identified 15,970 protein-coding sequences and was found to have less repetitive DNA (8.62%) than that of the chicken genome (9.45%). Studies have suggested that the population suffered at least two bottlenecks (four mya and 450,000 years ago), which resulted in a severe reduction in its effective population size.

== Behaviour and ecology ==
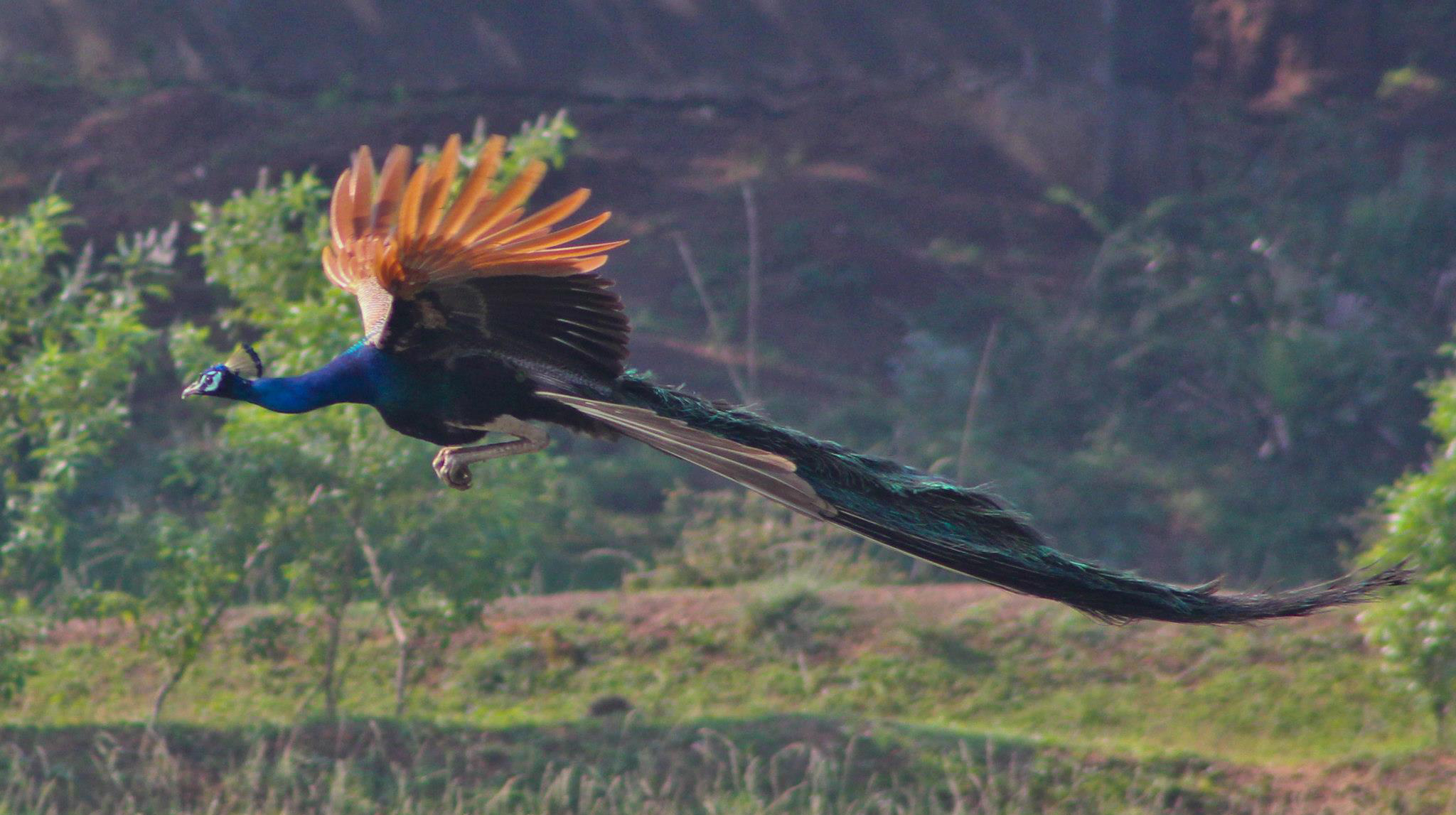
An Indian peacock in flight

The Indian peafowl forages on the ground in small groups, known as musters, that usually have a single peacock and three to five peahens. After the breeding season, the flocks tend to be made up only of females and young. It is found in the open early in the mornings and tends to rest under cover during the heat of the day. It is often sighted dust-bathing at dusk. It roosts on tall trees at night, but may sometimes make use of rocks or buildings. Birds usually arrive at their roosting sites during the dusk and call frequently before taking their positions. Despite its size, the Indian peafowl is capable of flight. However, it rarely flies and often escapes by running on foot through the undergrowth when perturbed or disturbed. When it takes off, it uses regular, slower flaps to maintain flight rather than gliding.

=== Diet ===
The Indian peafowl is found lazily feeding in the open early in the mornings, and might move to cultivated lands to feed during the mornings and the evenings. The groups often walk in single file to the nearby waterholes for a drink. The birds often congregate near human habitats and might be fed by humans. It is omnivorous and feeds on grass, seeds, flowerbuds, fruits, insects, and small reptiles. Around human settlements, it feeds on food scraps and even human excreta. Crops in its diet include peanut, tomato, paddy, chili pepper and bananas. In the Gir forest, its diet contains a large proportion of Zizyphus berries. Its diet in the Anaikatty Hills consists largely of vegetable matter and less than 9% of ants, termites, grasshoppers, beetles and earthworms. Two Indian peafowl were observed pecking on and teasing a cobra, but they did not kill it.

=== Communication ===
Call of Indian peafowl

The most common calls are a loud pia-ow or may-awe with the frequency of calling increasing before the monsoon season. It raises loud sounds when alarmed or disturbed and are often used to indicate the presence of a predators such as the tiger in the forests. It also makes other calls such as a rapid series of ka-aan..ka-aan or a rapid kok-kok. It often emits an explosive low-pitched honk! when agitated. It might even call at night when alarmed and neighboring birds may call in a relay like series. Nearly seven different call variants have been identified apart from six variants of alarm calls that are commonly produced by both the sexes.

=== Breeding ===
A cock courting hens

The Indian peacock is polygamous. The breeding season is associated with the onset of the monsoon rains.

Several often closely related cocks congregate at a lek site. They maintain small territories next to each other and allow females to visit them, but make no attempt to guard harems, and females do not favour specific males.

The peacock uses its ornate train in a courtship display, wherein it raises the tail feathers into an arched fan and quivers them. The wings are held half open and drooped and it periodically vibrates the long feathers, producing a ruffling sound. It faces the peahen initially and might turn around to display the tail. Display sites are usually open and elevated like fallen trees, large rocks and even roof tops.

The peacock also freezes over food to invite a peahen in a form of courtship feeding. When a peacock is displaying, peahens appear not to show any interest and usually continue foraging. Peacocks usually display in the presence of peahens, but sometimes also without them.

Cocks start shedding their train feathers between end of July in Bandipur National Park and end of October in eastern Tamil Nadu.

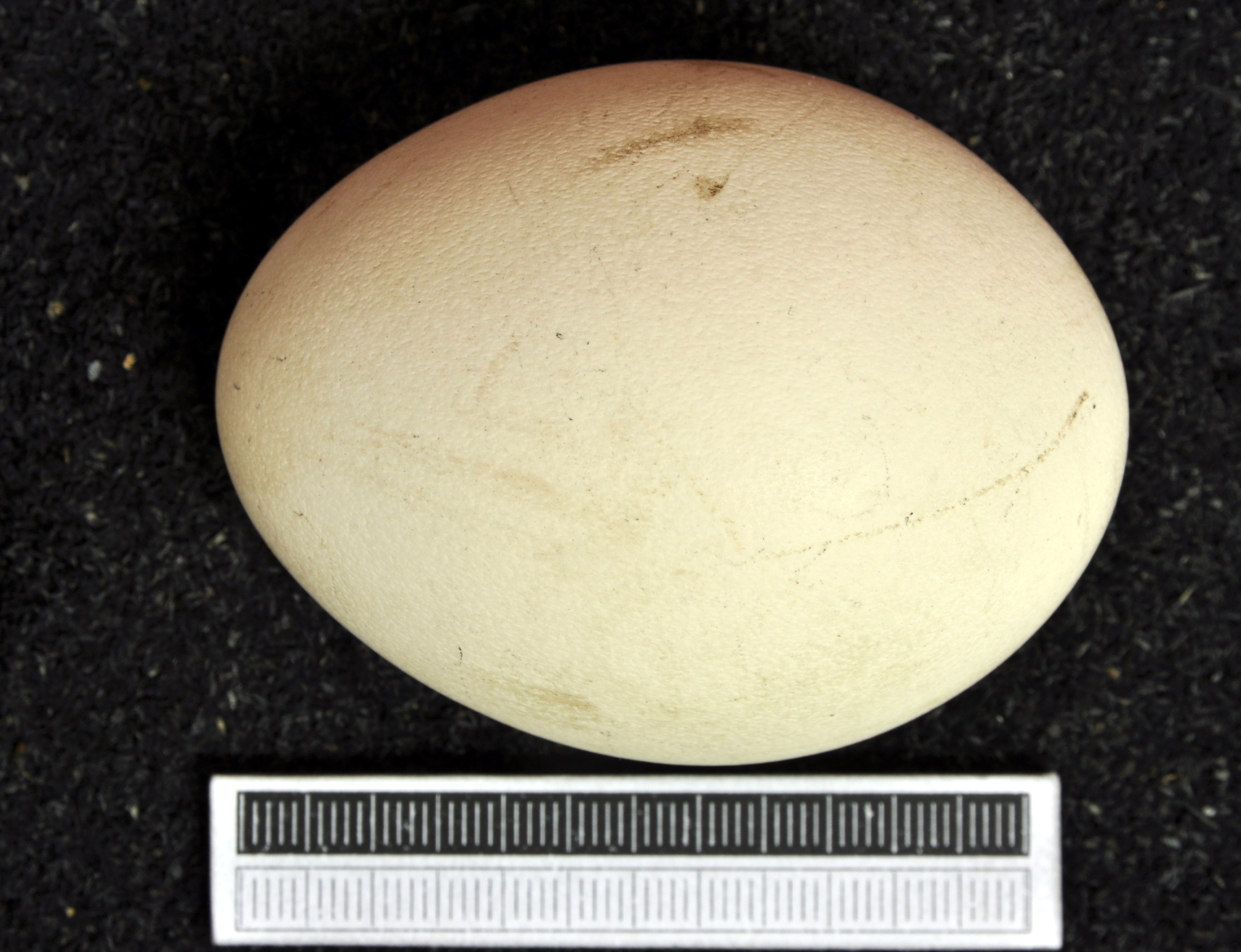
Indian peacock egg in the collection of Museum Wiesbaden

The Indian peafowl nests on crevices in buildings, and disused nests of vultures. Nests are usually shallow hollow scrapes on the ground lined with leaves, sticks and other debris. The female lays a clutch of three to eight oval shaped eggs. The eggs measure about 2.45–3 in (6.2–7.6 cm) in length and 1.42–2.2 in (3.6–5.6 cm) in width. They appear polished and have thick shells with pits and pores. The colour varies from pale white to buff or reddish-brown. The males take no part in hatching or rearing the young. However, isolated unusual instance of a male incubating a clutch of eggs has been reported. The eggs are incubated by the females for about 28 to 30 days.

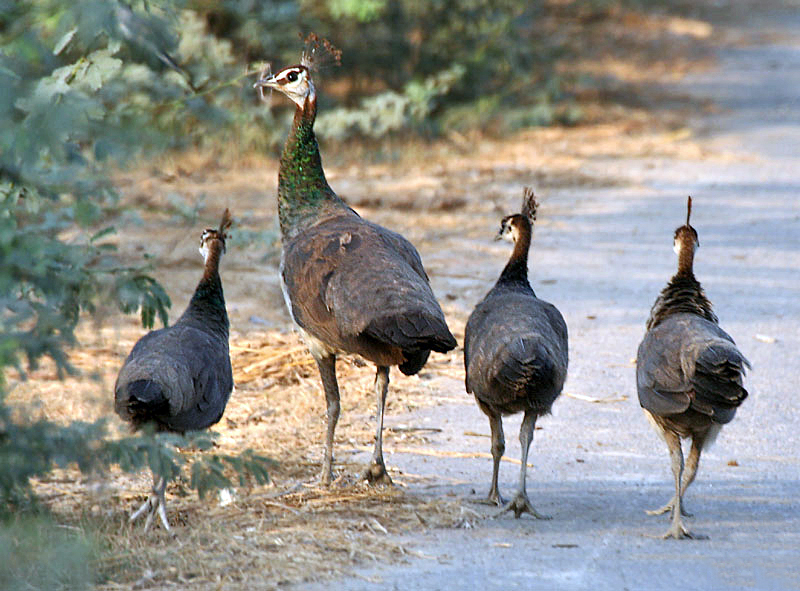
A peahen with chicks

The chicks are nidifugous and follow the mother around after hatching. Downy young may sometimes climb on their mothers' back and the female may carry them in flight to a safe tree branch.

=== Sexual selection ===
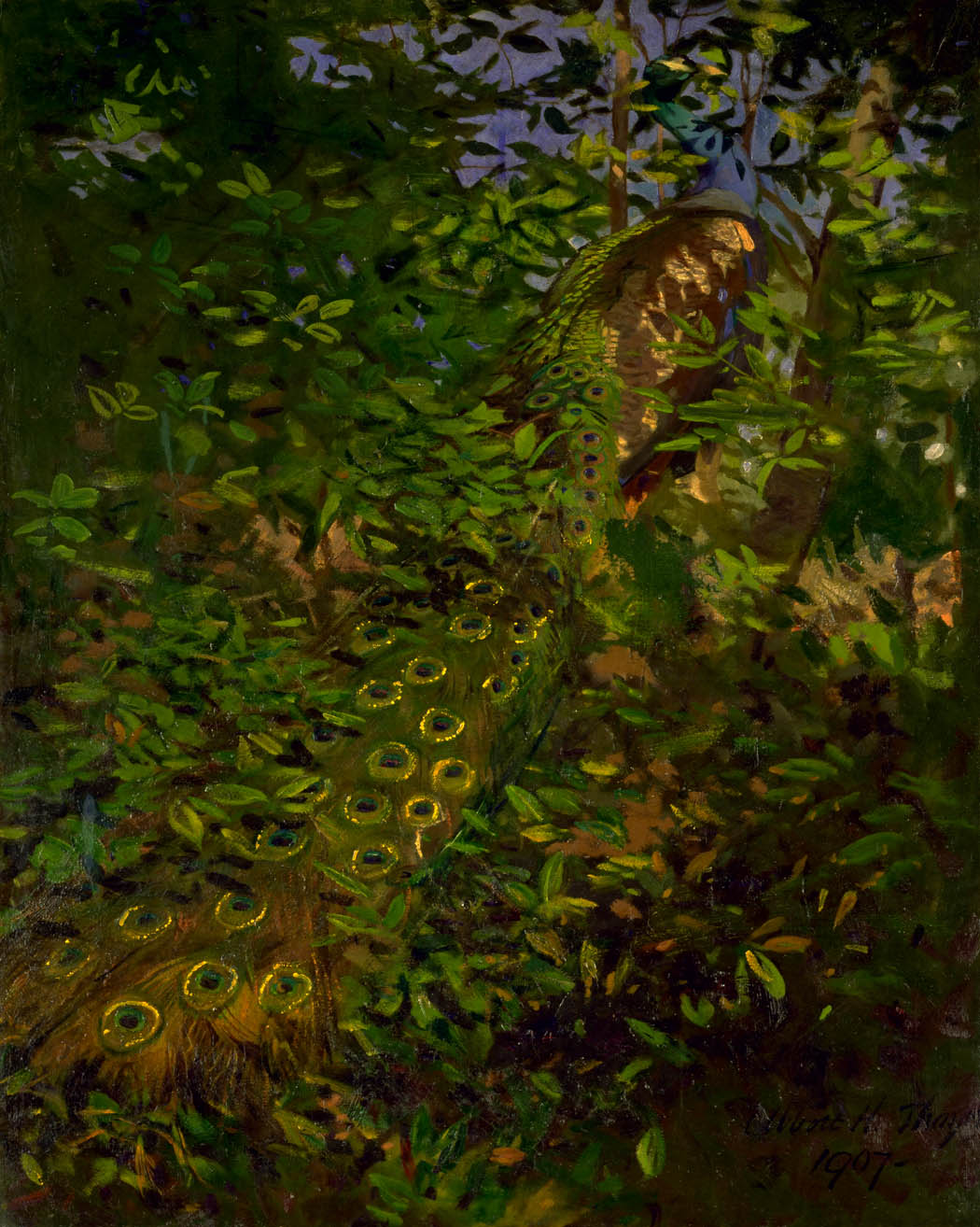
Abott Thayer's painting (1907)

The Indian peacock is known for its brighter and elaborate colours, compared to the much duller peahen, which has been a puzzle to scientists. Charles Darwin failed to see an adaptive advantage for the extravagant tail which seemed only to be an encumbrance. He wrote to botanist Asa Gray, "the sight of a feather in a peacock's tail, whenever I gaze at it, makes me sick!". He developed the principle of sexual selection to explain the problem, however, though not everyone accepted the theory. In 1907, American artist Abbott Handerson Thayer showed in his painting that the eyespots helped form a disruptive camouflage. In his 1909 book Concealing-Coloration in the Animal Kingdom, he denied the possibility of sexual selection and argued that essentially all forms of animal coloration had evolved as camouflage. The theory was criticized by Theodore Roosevelt.

In the 1970s, Amotz Zahavi proposed a possible resolution to the apparent contradiction between natural selection and sexual selection. He argued that the peacock honestly signalled the handicap principle of having a large and costly train. However, the mechanism may be less straightforward than it seems and the cost could be that the hormones that enhance feather development also results in the depression of the immune system. Ronald Fisher's runaway model proposed a positive feedback between female preference for elaborate trains and development of the elaborate train itself. However, this model assumes that the male train is a relatively recent evolutionary adaptation and a molecular phylogeny study shows the opposite that the most recently evolved species is actually the least ornamented one. This finding suggests a chase-away sexual selection in which females evolved resistance to the male ploy of elaborate trains".

A study on the feral population of Indian peafowl at Whipsnade Wildlife Park in southern England showed that the number of eyespots in the train predicted a male's mating success; further, this success could be manipulated by cutting the eyespots off some of the male's ornate feathers. Furthermore, the study also found that the chicks fathered by more ornamented males weighed more than those fathered by less ornamented males, which indicated an increased survival ability. However, recent studies have failed to find a relation between the number of displayed eyespots and mating success.

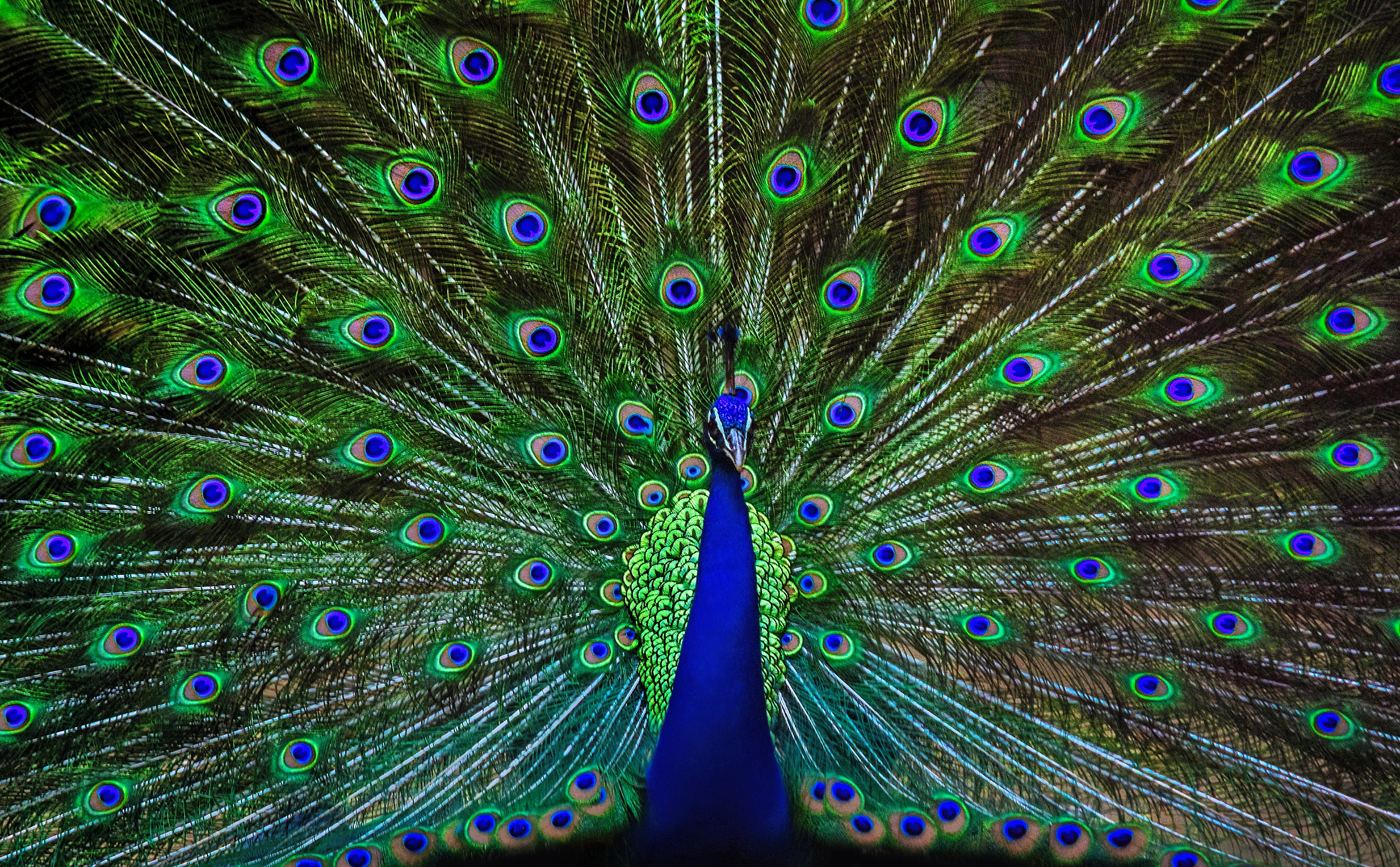
Close up of the open train of an Indian peacock, showing his eye-spots

A seven-year study of free-ranging peafowl came to the conclusion that female peafowl do not select mates solely on the basis of their trains and it is an obsolete signal for which female preference has already been "lost or weakened". It found no evidence that peahens expressed any preference for peacocks with more elaborate trains, trains having more ocelli, a more symmetrical arrangement, or greater length. It determined that the peacock's train was not the universal target of female mate choice, and do not correlate to male physical conditions. It argued that the removal of eyespots substantially changed the appearance of male peafowls, and it was likely that the females mistook these males for sub-adults, or perceived that the males were physically damaged. Moreover, in a feral peafowl population, there is little variation in the number of eyespots in adult males as it is rare for adult males to lose a significant number of eyespots and hence, it might not form the basis for sexual selection. The British research team argued that alternative explanations for these results had been overlooked, and concluded that female choice might indeed vary in different ecological conditions.

A 2010 study on a natural population of Indian peafowls in northern India proposed a "high maintenance handicap" theory. It stated that only the fittest males can afford the time and energy to maintain a long tail and the long train is an indicator of good body condition, which results in greater mating success. While train length seems to correlate positively with major histocompatibility complex diversity in males, females do not appear to use train length to choose males. Another study in France brought up two possible explanations with the first explanation stating that there might be a genetic variation of the trait of interest under different geographical areas due to a founder effect and/or a genetic drift. The second explanation suggested that "the cost of trait expression may vary with environmental conditions," so that a trait that is indicative of a particular quality may not work in another environment. A 2013 study that tracked the eye movements of peahens responding to male displays found that the peahens looked in the direction of the upper train of feathers only when at long distances and that they looked only at the lower feathers when males displayed close to them. The rattling of the tail and the shaking of the wings helped in keeping the attention of females.

=== Lifespan and mortality ===
The Indian peafowl is known to live for up to 23 years in captivity. However, it is estimated to live for only about 15 years in the wild.

Adult Indian peafowls are difficult to capture since they can usually escape predators by flying into trees; tiger, leopard, hyena, dhole and golden jackal ambush adult individuals. Smaller peafowl are sometimes hunted by large birds of prey such as changeable hawk-eagle and rock eagle-owl. Chicks are more prone to predation than adult birds. Adults living near human habitations might sometimes be hunted by domestic dogs or by humans. The peafowls often forage in groups as it provides some safety as there are more eyes to look out for predators.

== Threats and conservation ==
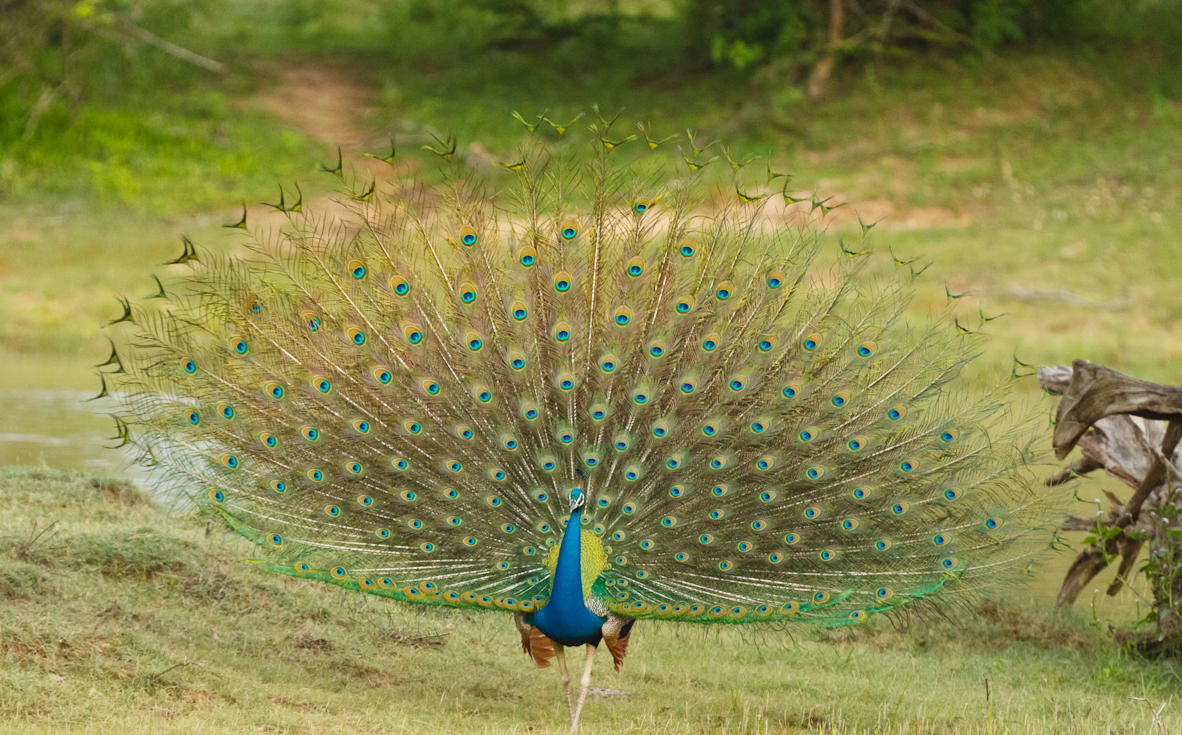
A male Indian peafowl at Yala National Park in Sri Lanka

The Indian peafowl is widely distributed across India and Sri Lanka, with introduced feral colonies in many parts of the world. Conservative estimates of the population in 2002 put them at more than 100,000. While the exact population size is unknown, it is not thought to declined, and it is classified as least concern on the IUCN Red List.

Poaching of peacocks for their meat and feathers and accidental poisoning by feeding on pesticide treated seeds are known threats to wild birds. It is also hunted in some areas for usage in folk remedies. The Indian peafowl has been part of the agricultural ecosystem for centuries, where it aids in seed dispersal and feeds on pests such as insects and small rodents. However, it can cause a 40% decrease in yield in rice fields due to the damage caused. In urban areas, they can damage plants in gardens, attack their reflections thereby breaking glass and mirrors, perch and scratch cars or leave their droppings.

The Indian peafowl is protected both culturally and by law in India and Sri Lanka. Methods to identify if feathers have been plucked or have been shed naturally have been developed, as Indian law allows only the collection of feathers that have been shed. Several cities have introduced peafowl management programmes, which include education on how to prevent the birds from causing damage while treating the birds humanely. Various wildlife sanctuaries have been established in India such as Adichunchanagiri Hills, Choolannur Pea Fowl Sanctuary, and Viralimalai Bird Sanctuary for the protection of the Indian peafowl.

The Indian peafowl also breeds readily in captivity and various zoos, parks; bird-fanciers maintain breeding populations across the world.

== In culture ==
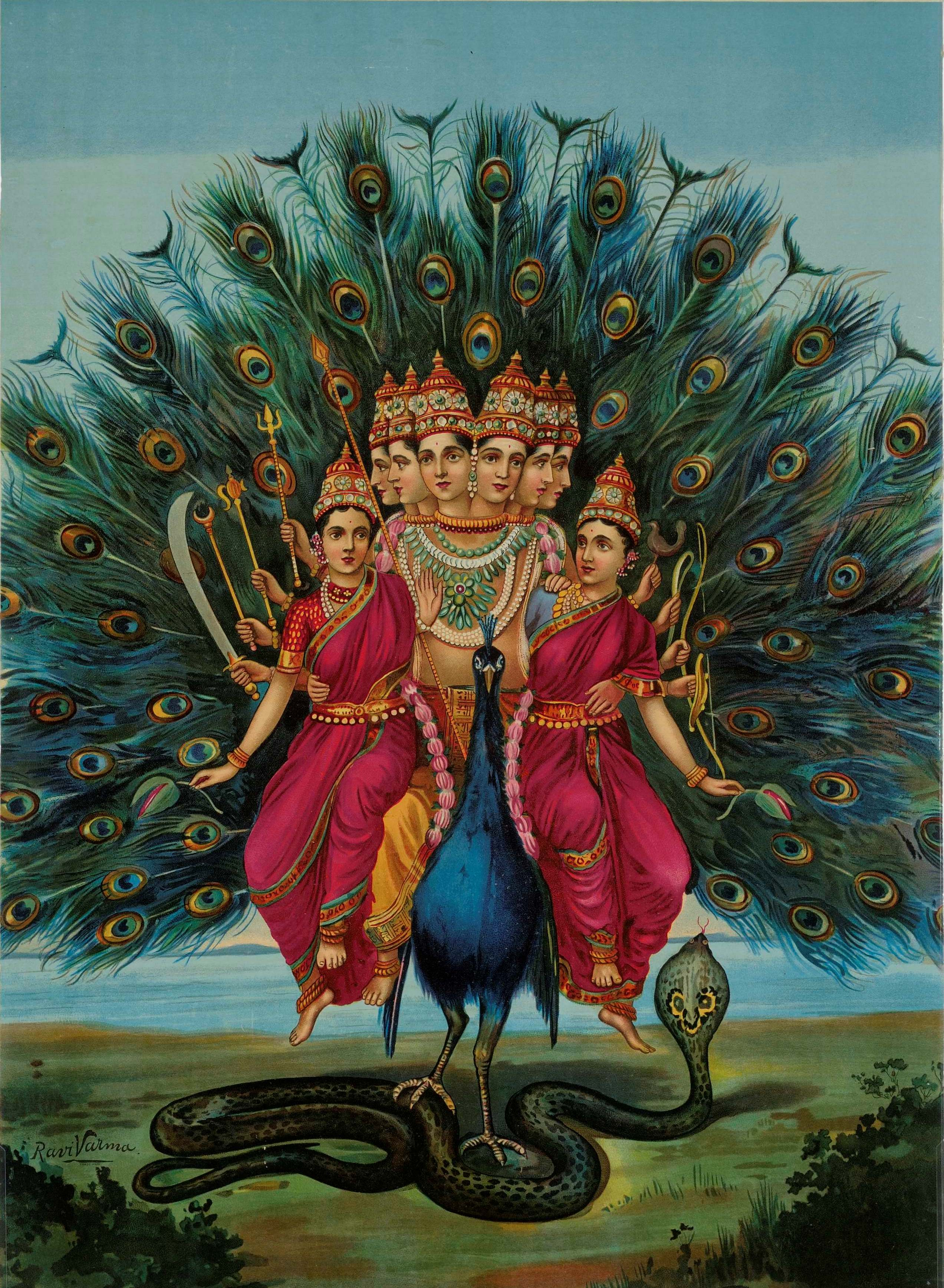
Kartikeya with his consorts riding a peacock, painting by Raja Ravi Varma

The Indian peafowl has been used in numerous mythological and contemporary representations. It is designated as the national bird of India. In the Indian subcontinent, many Hindu deities are associated with the bird, and it is frequently depicted in various temple art, mythology, poetry, folk music, and traditions. The Hindu war god Kartikeya is depicted as using an Indian peacock named Paravani as his vahana. Hindu god Krishna is often depicted with an Indian peacock feather on his crown. The Ramayana describes that the head of the devas, Indra, who unable to defeat the asura king Ravana, sheltered under the wing of a peacock and later blessed it with a "thousand eyes" and fearlessness from serpents. Another mythological story narrates that Indra was cursed with a thousand ulcers and was transformed into a peacock with a thousand eyes before his curse was removed by Vishnu. In Buddhist philosophy, the Indian peacock represents wisdom.

Numerous uses of the bird's parts as an antidote to snake venom in Ayurveda and other folk remedies have been documented. It is part of folklore with beliefs such as the impregnation of peahens orally by means of the tears of the peacocks. In Greek mythology, the origin of the Indian peacock's plumage is explained in the tale of Hera and Argus. The main figure of Yezidis, Melek Taus, is commonly depicted as a peacock. A golden peacock is considered as a symbol of Ashkenazi Jewish culture, and is the subject of several folktales and songs in Yiddish. In the Middle Ages, knights in Europe took a "vow of the peacock" and decorated their helmets with its plumes. In Robin Hood stories, the titular archer uses arrows fletched with peacock feathers. Peacock feathers were buried with Viking warriors.

The birds were often kept in menageries and as ornaments in large gardens and estates in the middle ages. In 1526, the legal issue as to whether peacocks were wild or domestic fowl was thought sufficiently important for Cardinal Wolsey to summon all the English judges to give their opinion, which was that they are domestic fowl. Indian peacocks were frequently used in European heraldry with the peacocks most often depicted as facing the viewer and with the tails displayed. In this pose, the peacock is referred to as being "in his pride". Peacock tails, in isolation from the rest of the bird, are rare in British heraldry, but are used frequently in German systems. The Indian peacock feathers are used in many rituals and ornamentation and its motifs are widespread in architecture, coinage, textiles and modern items of art and utility. Indian peacock motifs are widely used even today such as in the logos of the NBC television network and SriLankan Airlines.

The term "peacocking" is often used as a means of depicting pride in English language and is used to describe someone who is very proud or gives a lot of attention to clothing. In Australia, it referred to the practice of buying up the best pieces of land so as to render the surrounding lands valueless.
