= Cauvery North Wildlife Sanctuary =

Protected area in India

Coordinates: 12.41°N 77.87°E

- IUCN category IV (habitat/species management area)
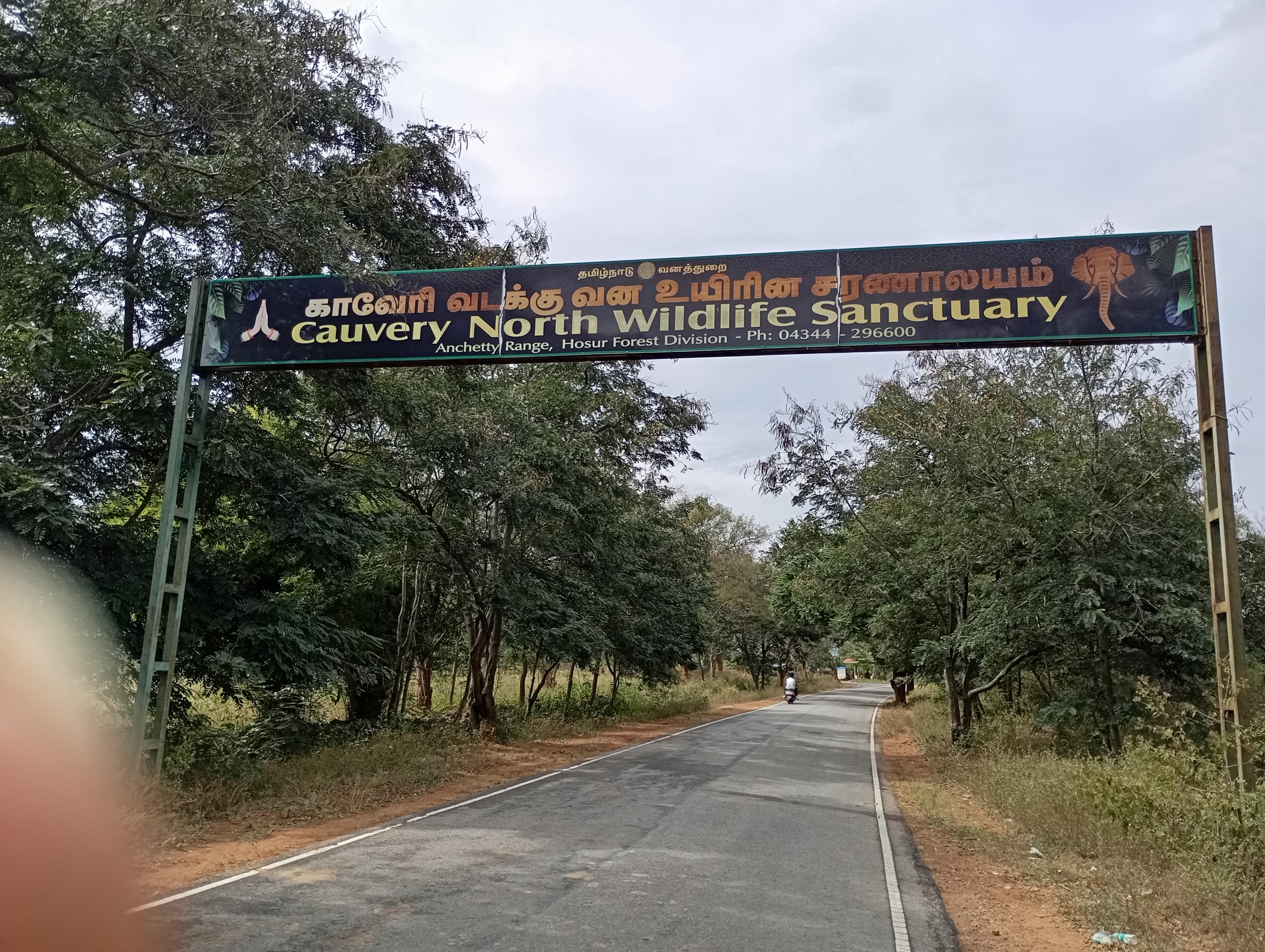
- Cauvery North Wildlife Sanctuary

- Location within Tamil Nadu Location within India
- Interactive map of Cauvery North Wildlife Sanctuary
- Location: Dharmapuri and Krishnagiri districts, Tamil Nadu, India
- Area: 504.33
- Established: 2014

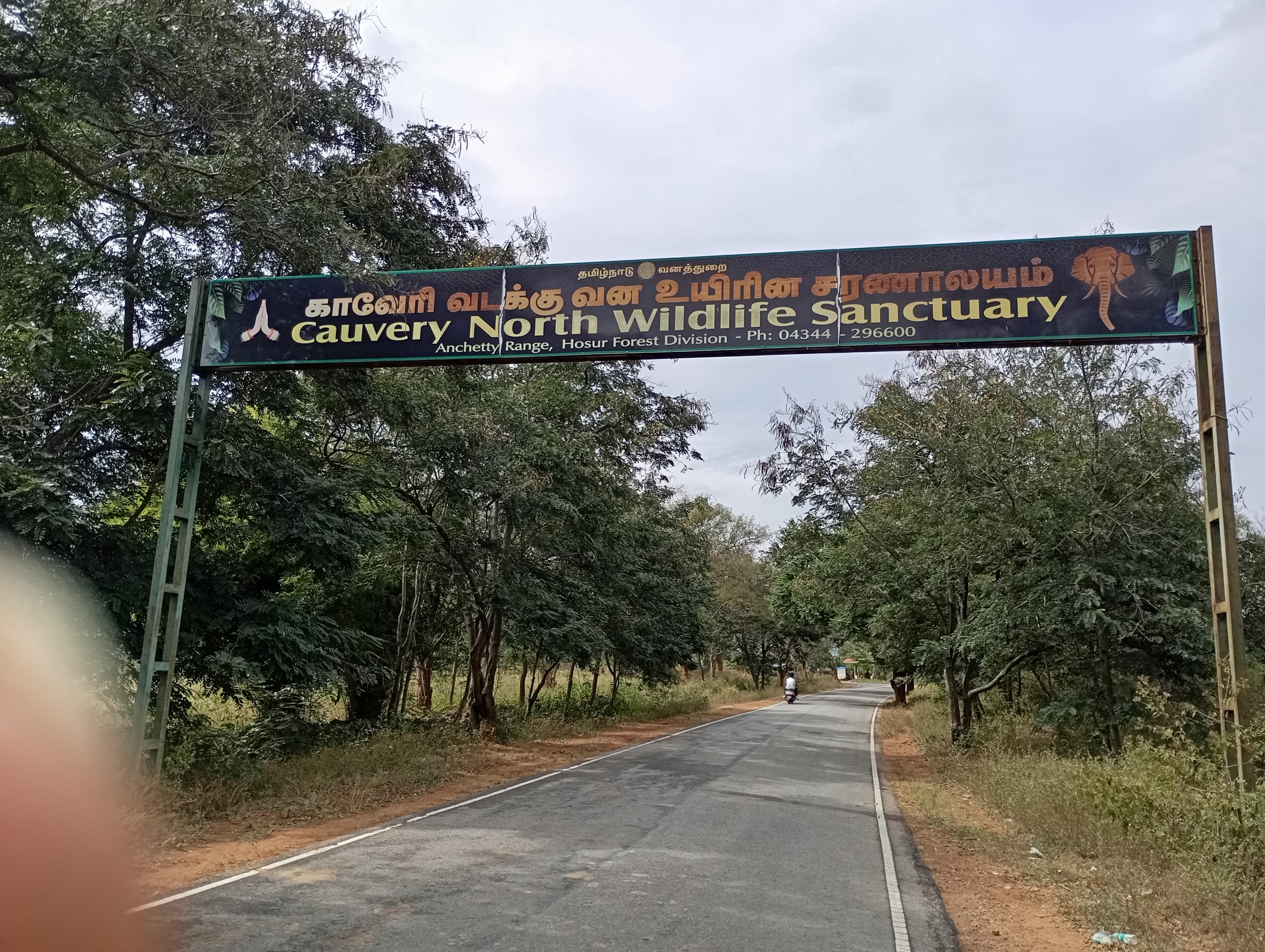
Cauvery North Wildlife Sanctuary

The Cauvery North Wildlife Sanctuary is a protected area located in the Dharmapuri and Krishnagiri districts of Tamil Nadu, India. Sanctuary is named as it is located above the north of Cauvery river in Tamil Nadu state and south of river connects to the Cauvery Wildlife Sanctuary of Karnataka state. On 12 March 2014, the Government of Tamil Nadu declared Cauvery North Wild Life Sanctuary under clause (b) of sub-section (1) of Section 26-A of the Wild Life (Protection) Act, 1972 in Gazette No.II(2)/EF/254/2014.

Sanctuary comes under the Melagiri Hill ranges which is a significant wildlife corridor in the confluence of Eastern Ghats and Western Ghats where it forms the vital link to the MM Hills, BR Hills, Sathyamangalam Wildlife Sanctuary and Nilgiri Biosphere Reserve. The sanctuary covers parts Palacode taluk of Dharmapuri forest division and Denkanikottai taluk of Hosur forest division in northern western Tamil Nadu.

== See also ==
- Cauvery South Wildlife Sanctuary
