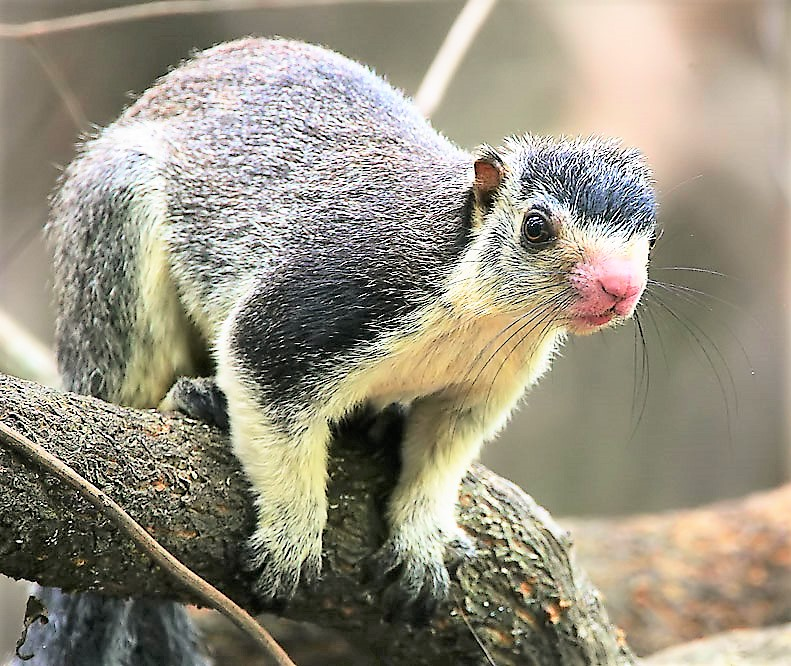
- The nominate subspecies from Sri Lanka

Conservation status
- Near Threatened (IUCN 3.1)
- CITES Appendix II

Scientific classification
- Kingdom: Animalia
- Phylum: Chordata
- Class: Mammalia
- Order: Rodentia
- Family: Sciuridae
- Genus: Ratufa
- Species: R. macroura

Binomial name
- Ratufa macroura (Pennant, 1769)

Subspecies
- R. m. macroura; R. m. dandolena; R. m. melanochra
- Grizzled giant squirrel range

Synonyms
- Ratufa macroura Phillips, 1931 subspecies sinhala Ratufa macrurus Blyth, 1859 subspecies albipes Sciurus ceilonensis Boddaert, 1785; Sciurus ceylonensis Erxleben, 1777; Sciurus ceylonica (Erxleben, 1777); Sciurus macrourus Pennant, 1769; Sciurus macrourus Kelaart, 1852 variety monatnus Sciurus macrourus (Kelaart, 1852) variety montana Sciurus macrura Blanford, 1891; Sciurus tennentii Blyth, 1849; Sciurus zeyllanicus Day, 1693

= Grizzled giant squirrel =

Species of rodent

The grizzled giant squirrel (Ratufa macroura) is a large tree squirrel in the genus Ratufa found in the highlands of the Central and Uva provinces of Sri Lanka, and in patches of riparian forest along the Kaveri River and in the hill forests of Karnataka, Tamil Nadu and Kerala states of southern India. The International Union for Conservation of Nature (IUCN) lists the species as near threatened due to habitat loss and hunting.

== Etymology and common names ==
Grizzled giant squirrels are named for the white flecks of hair that cover their greyish-brown bodies, giving them a grizzled look. In Sinhala, they are known as dandu lena (දඬු ලේනා, lit. "stalk[-tailed] squirrel"); while in Tamil, they are called periya aṇil (பெரிய அணில், "giant squirrel") or malai aṇil (மலை அணில், "hill squirrel").

== Description ==
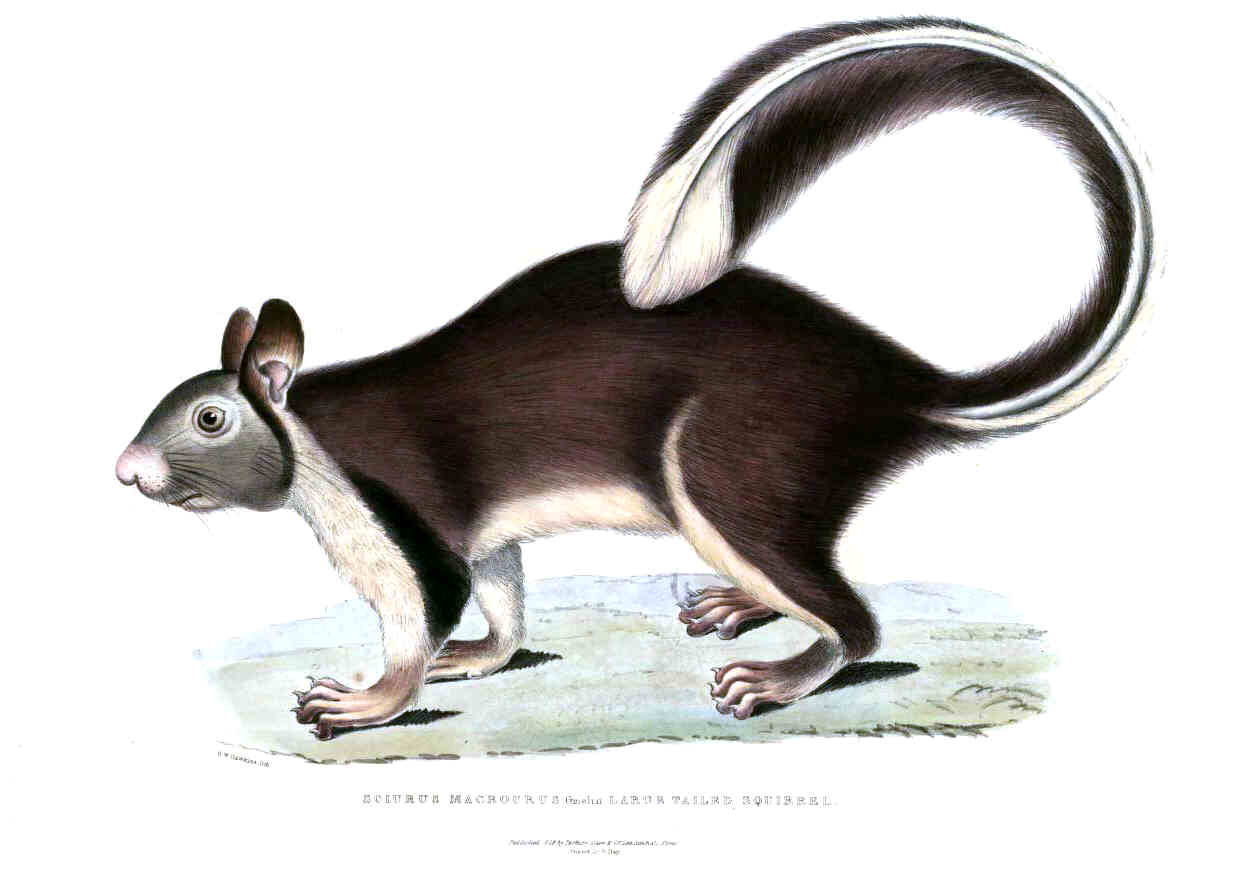
Illustration of Ratufa macroura

R. macroura is the smallest of the giant squirrels found in the Indian subcontinent, with a head and body length of 25 to 45 cm (10–18 in), and tail measuring roughly the same or more, for a total length of 50 to 90 cm (20–35 in). It has small rounded ears with pointed tufts. The home range of an individual is between 1,970 and 6,110 m^{2} (21,200–65,800 ft^{2}).

Subspecies dandolena is dorsally brown grizzled with white. Ventrally light brownish cream. Tail frosted with white fur. Forehead and feet are black in color. Whereas ssp. melanochra, upper parts are jet black which contrast brownish cream to orange yellow ventral surface. Tail frosted with black fur. Snout of both ssp. are pinkish color.

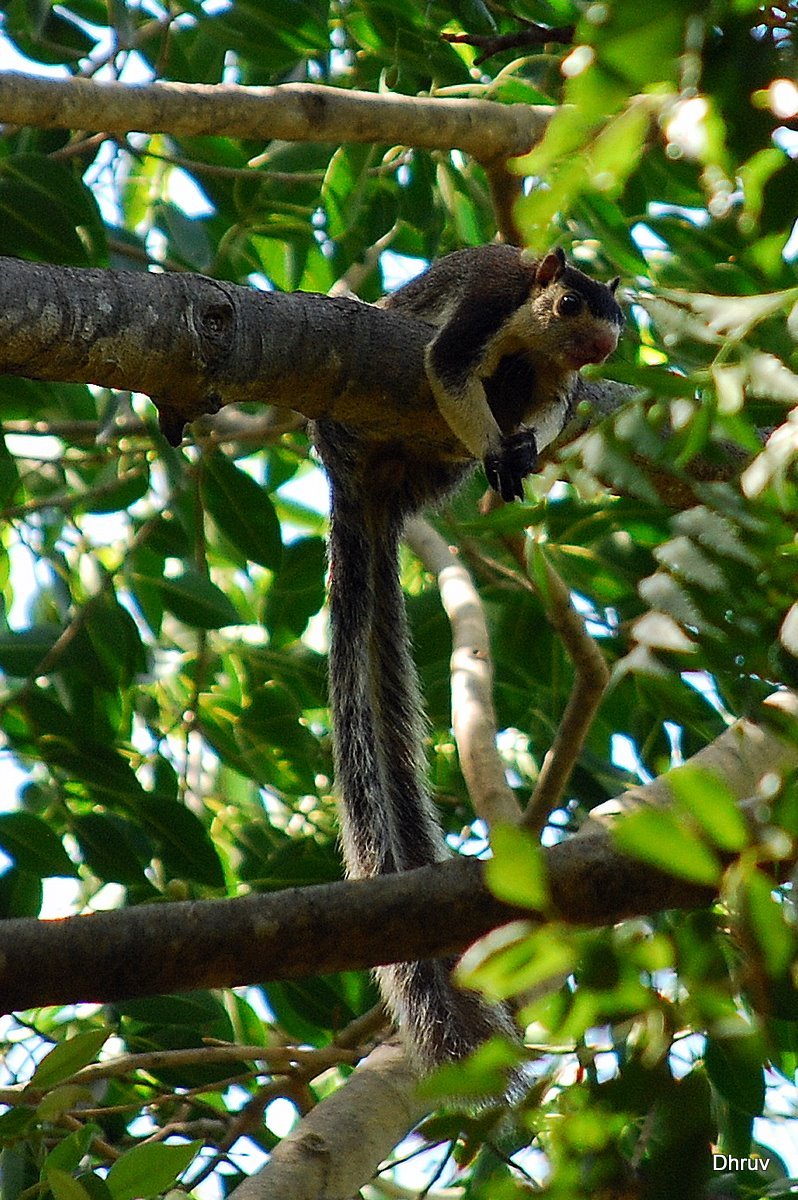

Their vision is good, which aids them in detecting predators. Their sense of hearing is relatively poor. The call is staccato and loud with repeated shrill cackle. It is usually uttered in morning and evening. A low "churr" is also used to communicate with nearby groups.

Hands are normally pentadactylous, with four digits and a rudimentary thumb. Fingers have large broad soft pads, where the inner pad is expanded for gripping while moving through branches. Feet are also comprised with soft pads with both fore and hind limbs possessing long, sharp claws.

== Distribution ==
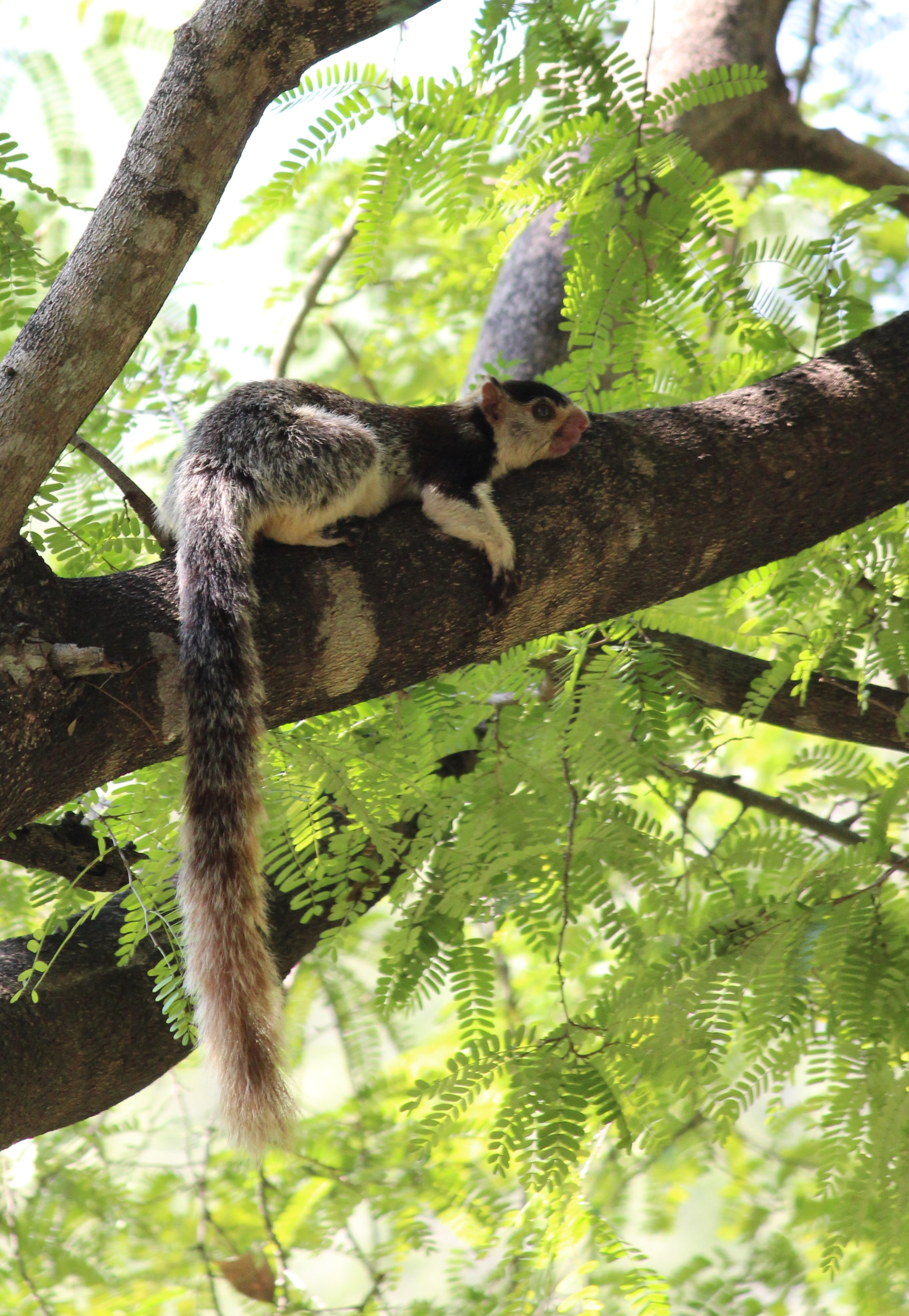
Grizzled giant squirrel from Chinnar wildlife sanctuary

In India, R. macroura has been recorded from Grizzled Squirrel Wildlife Sanctuary, Theni Forest Division, Palni Hills, Chinnar Wildlife Sanctuary, Anaimalai Tiger reserve, Sirumalai, Thiruvannamalai Forest Division of the Eastern Ghats, Hosur Forest Division and Cauvery Wildlife Sanctuary. The easternmost population of Ratufa macroura dandolena was discovered in the Pakkamalai Reserve Forest in eastern Tamil Nadu.

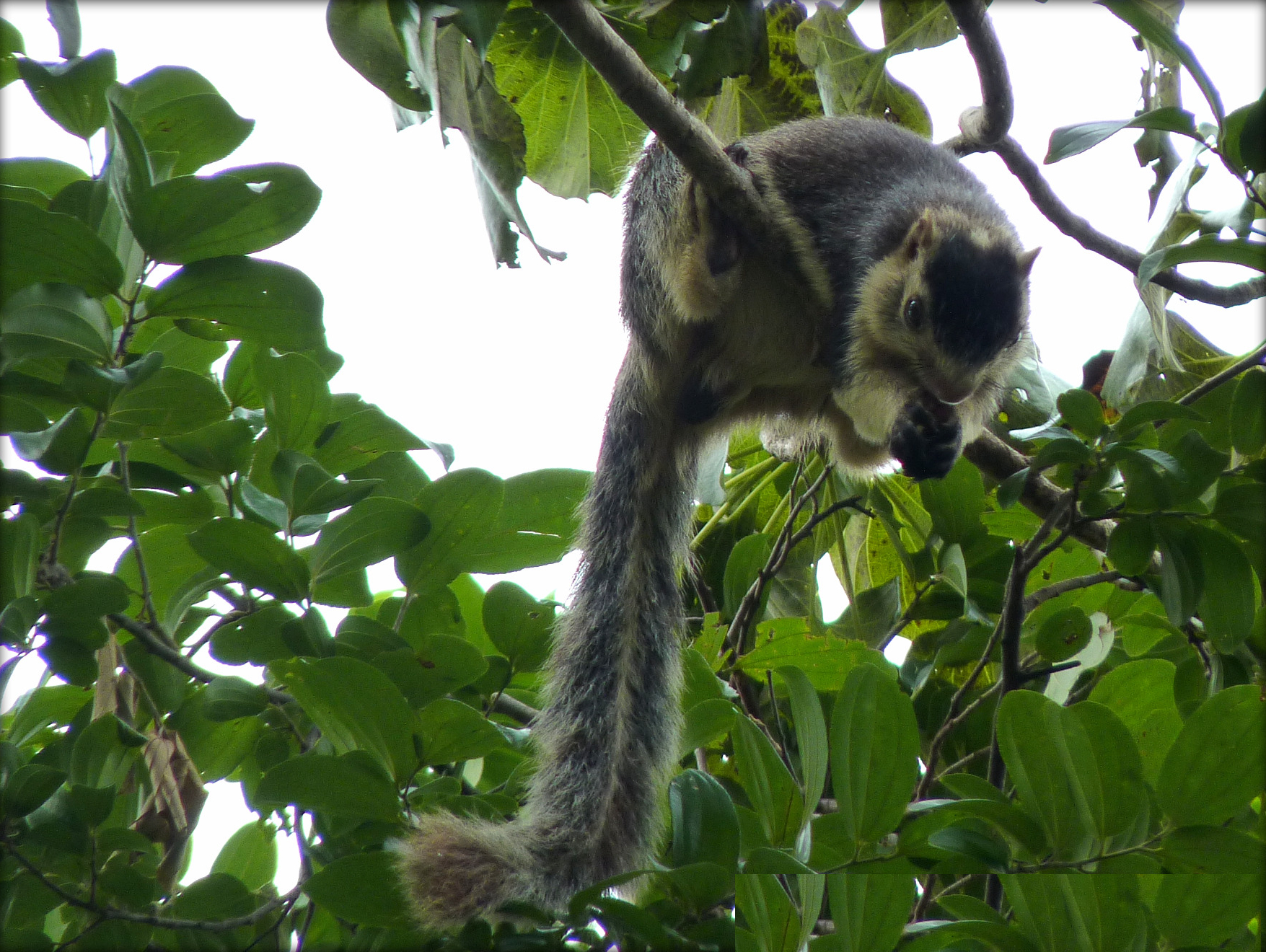
Ratufa macroura macroura

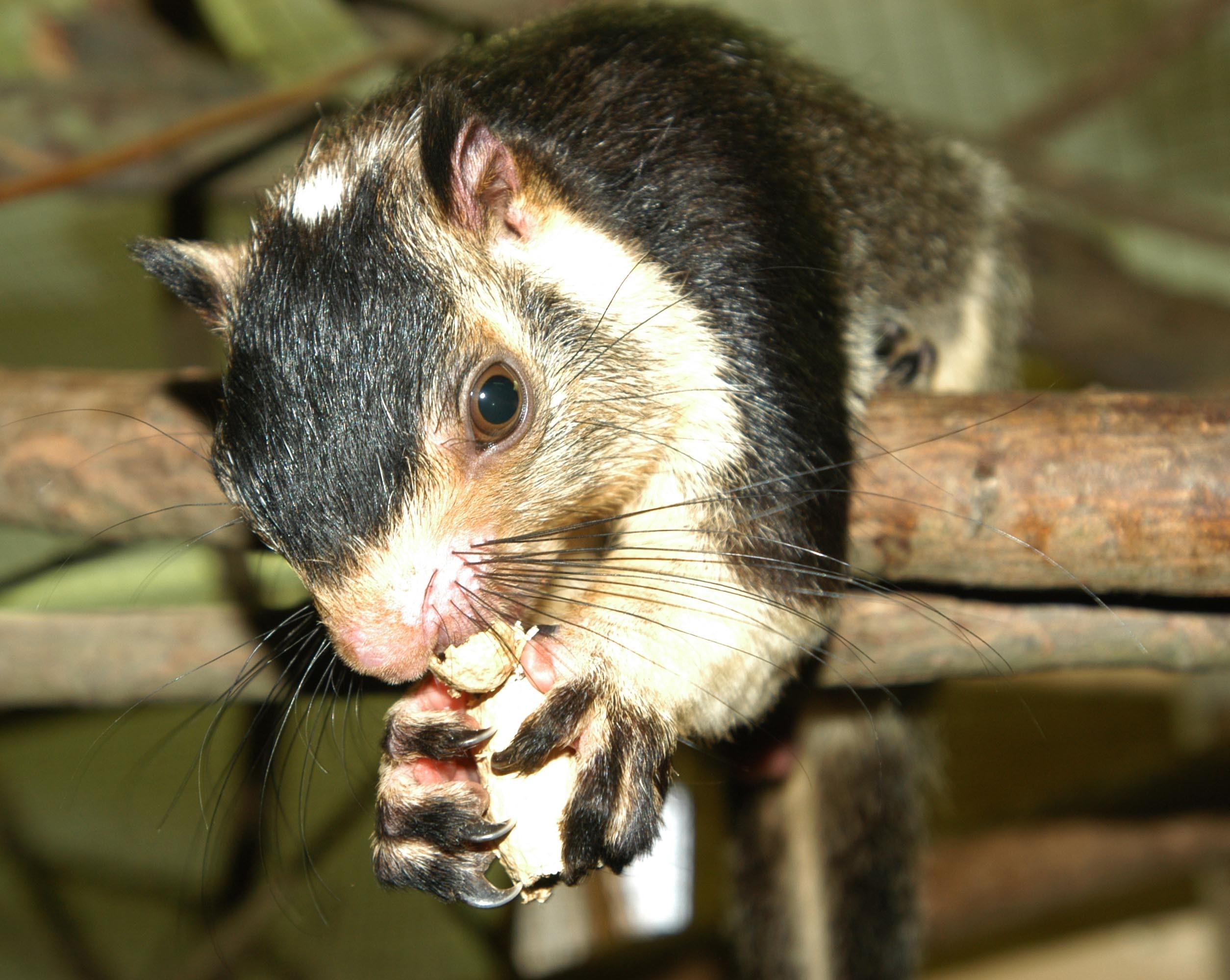
Ratufa macroura melanochra

Grizzled Squirrel Wildlife Sanctuary is located in Shenbagathoppu, Srivilliputtur, Tamil Nadu, India.

== Diet ==
Ratufa macroura are known to eat fruits, nuts, insects, bird eggs, and the bark of some trees. The fruit of the climber Combretum ovalifolium is an especially important food source where it occurs. Young squirrels, upon first emerging from the nest, have been observed to feed exclusively on this fruit.

== Behaviour ==
Unlike its relatives, the giant squirrel balances using its two hind feet, instead of its tail.

The species is almost entirely an arboreal, very rarely coming to the ground to escape from predators, to flee from an intruder, attack males of the territory, and connecting with females.

== Subspecies ==
The three subspecies are easily recognizable due to the geographically separate distributions and color variations. The table below lists the three recognized subspecies of Ratufa macroura, along with any synonyms associated with each subspecies:

According to Mammals of Sri Lanka, the three subspecies are identified as follows:

- Ratufa macroura macroura

Males are 35 cm long and females with 37 cm. Tail is 37 cm long in males and 38 cm in females. Jet black dorsal area with a sheen. Rump with white grizzling appearance. Underparts brownish creamy to pale yellow. Tail is with dark black fur with white tip. Face has pink color in naked areas. Fur moderately long with few coarse hairs. Geographically, this subspecies is restricted to central highlands up to 2000m, such as Horton Plains.

- Ratufa macroura dandolena

Males are 37 cm long and females 35 cm. Tail varies from 37 cm in males and 40 cm in females. Males are larger than females. Dorsal surface is brown instead of jet black in subsp. macroura. White rump. Distinct maroon tinge between shoulders. There is a brownish cream crown patch. Underparts are light brownish cream. Tail is dark brown and there is a reddish-brown tip. Fleshy parts of face are pink. Fur moderately long and coarse. Inhabit dry zone parts of the island, as well as India.

- Ratufa macroura melanochra

Males are 35 cm long and females 37 cm. Tail varies from 37 cm in males and 38 cm in females. Upperparts are jet black with contrasting color variation with creamy yellowish ventral surface. Fur is shorter and coarser. Found in low country wet zone, and intermediate zones of the country.

Ratufa macroura taxonomy
Subspecies	Authority	Synonyms
R. m. macroura	Pennant (1769)	albipes, ceilonensis, ceylonica, macrura, montana, tennentii
R. m. dandolena	Thomas and Wroughton (1915)	sinhala
R. m. melanochra	Thomas and Wroughton (1915)	none
