= Grizzled Squirrel Wildlife Sanctuary =

Wildlife sanctuary in Tamil Nadu, India

- IUCN category IV (habitat/species management area)
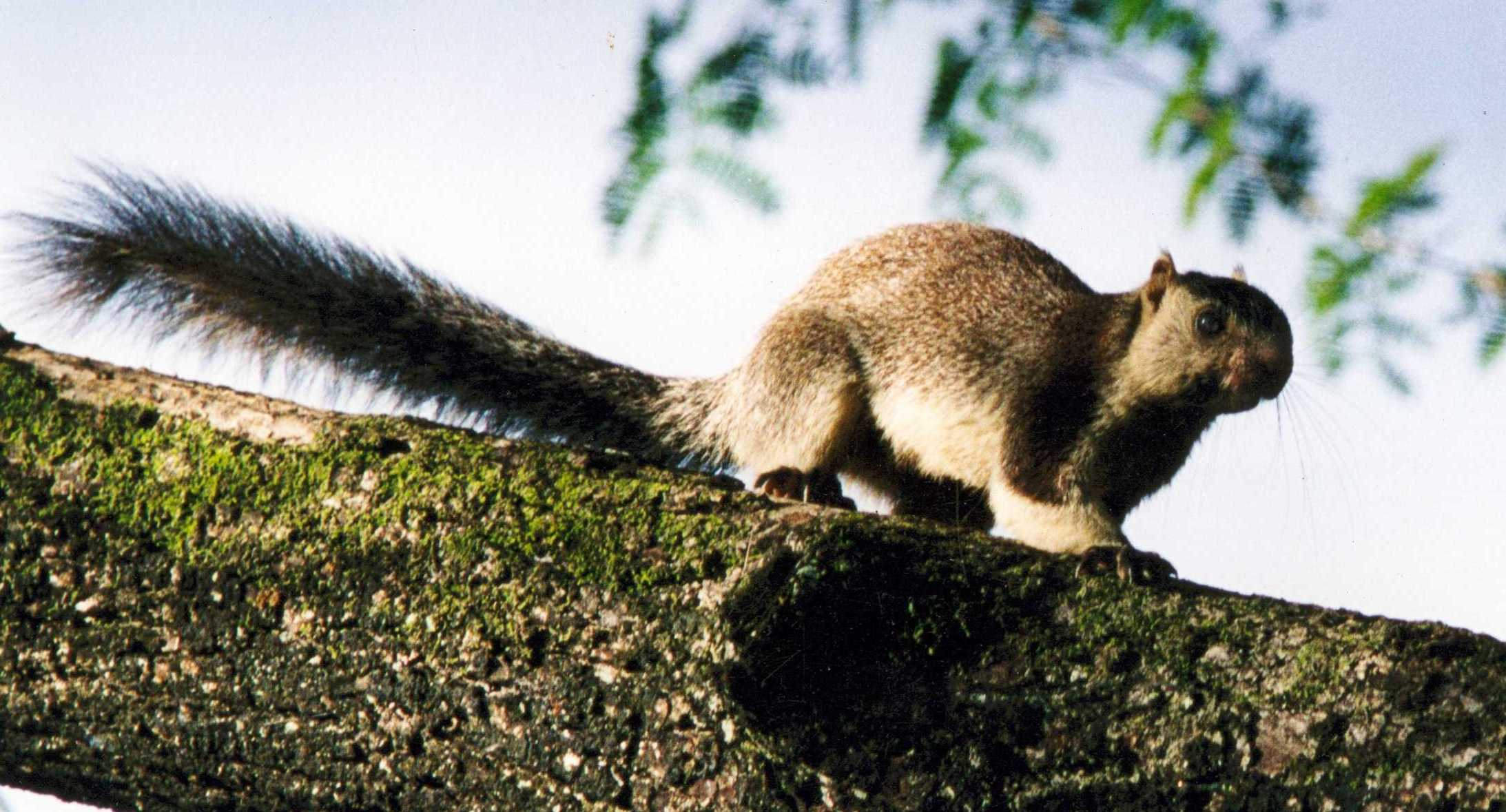

- Location within Tamil Nadu Location within India
- Interactive map of Grizzled Squirrel; Wildlife Sanctuary
- Location: Virudhunagar, Madurai and Theni districts
- Nearest city: Madurai
- Coordinates: 9°34′30″N 77°33′30″E
- Area: 480 square kilometres (190 sq mi)
- Established: December 1989
- Governing body: Tamil Nadu Forest Department
- Website: www.forests.tn.nic.in/WildBiodiversity/ws_sgsws.html

The Grizzled Squirrel Wildlife Sanctuary (GSWS), also known as Srivilliputhur Wildlife Sanctuary, was established in 1988 to protect the Near threatened grizzled giant squirrel (Ratufa macroura). Occupying an area of 485.2 km^{2}, it is bordered on the southwest by the Periyar Tiger Reserve and is one of the best preserved forests south of the Palghat Gap.

The sanctuary covers 485 km^{2} (187 sq mi) in western Tamil Nadu, South India in the eastern water-shed of the Western Ghats and consists of high hills and valleys, with a number of peaks reaching up to 2,019 m (6,624 ft).

== Geography ==
The Grizzled Squirrel Wildlife Sanctuary is located from 9° 21' to 9° 48' N and 77°21' to 77°46' E. The sanctuary lies mostly in Virudhunagar district especially in Srivilliputtur and partly in Madurai district. The sanctuary is bounded to the north by the Andipatti hills, south by Tirunelveli District, east by Srivilliputhur and Rajapalayam towns and west by Theni town and Theni District. It is the eastern boundary of the Periyar river watershed. This sanctuary is contiguous to Periyar Tiger Reserve on the south western side and the Megamalai Reserve Forest on the north western side and Its southern limit is contiguous with the Sivagiri Reserved Forest of Tirunelveli Forest Division. The elevation ranges from 100 m (330 ft) in the plains and rises to the highest peak, Kottamala, at 2,019 m (6,624 ft). Average annual rainfall is 849.1 mm (33.43 in) and varies between 800 and 2,300 mm (31 and 91 in) in different areas of the sanctuary. Water sources for the sanctuary are the Kallar and Mullaperiyar Dams and the Periyar, Naragaiar, Pachaiar, Mangar, Kovilar and Pairakudraiar rivers. The underlying rock throughout the area is granitoid gneiss formation. The lowest altitudes have a mixture of quartz and quartzite.

== Fauna ==
In addition to grizzled giant squirrels, other animals seen here are Bengal tiger, bonnet macaque, common langur, elephants, flying squirrels, gaur, Indian giant squirrel, leopard, lion-tailed macaques, mouse deer, Nilgiri langur, Nilgiri Tahrs, palm civets, porcupine, sambar, slender loris, sloth bear, spotted deer, tree shrews, wild boar and wild cats.

Resident and migrating elephants are common. The wildlife census in 2002 counted 156 elephants. There were more grizzled giant squirrels sighted in 2009 than in 2008. In 2008, a group of 30 lion-tailed macaques were sighted during the annual census, but in the 2009 census more than 45 lion-tailed macaques, including a sizeable number of young macaques, were sighted in a single group between Nagariyar and Periyakavu patch. Nilgiri Tahr have been sighted in the entire division starting from Kottamala in Rajapalayam to Perumal Malai in Sathuragiri Hills near Sundara Mahalingam temple in Saptoor. A tiger was also seen in Sathuragiri during the 2009 census. In recent years there has been a significant increase in the population of the tahrs with the census in 2011 putting their numbers at 220 individuals.

Recognised as an Important Bird Area, over 275 species of birds are seen in this sanctuary including 14 species of birds endemic to the Western Ghats, such as the critically endangered Oriental white-backed vulture and the long-billed vulture, vulnerable species Nilgiri wood-pigeon, broad-tailed grass warbler, red-faced malkoha and the white-bellied shortwing (Brachypteryx major) and near threatened species like the great pied hornbill, Nilgiri pipit, black-and-orange flycatcher and the Nilgiri flycatcher. The Malayan night heron is of lesser concern. The primary raptors here are the serpent eagle, hawks and black eagle. A bird survey in 2013 observed in the sanctuary rare endemic species including Sri Lankan frogmouth, mountain and rufous-bellied hawk-eagles, great Indian and Malabar pied hornbills, mountain and green imperial pigeons which are all species found only in the higher altitudes of Western Ghats. Some of the rare migratory birds spotted included the steppe eagle, Eurasian sparrowhawk and bluecapped rockthrush.

The sanctuary has numerous reptiles including king cobras, Indian rock python and many endemic species namely pit vipers, ornate flying snake, Draco or gliding lizard, large-scaled calotes and Monilesaurus ellioti and amphibians including endemic ones like Micrixalus, Indirana, Nyctibatrachus, Ramanella, Rhacophorus malabaricus, Raorchestes and Pseudophilautus.

There are over 220 species of butterflies documented in the sanctuary including many rare and endemic species. Some of the rare butterflies spotted here include Evershed's ace, silver royal, orange awlet, and Hampson's hedge blue.

== Flora ==
The sanctuary is a mix of tropical evergreen forests and East Deccan dry evergreen forestss of 69.32 km^{2} (26.76 sq mi), dry deciduous forests and South Western Ghats moist deciduous forests of 51.66 km^{2} (19.95 sq mi)), grassland of 152.18 km^{2} (58.76 sq mi) and cultivated land of 121.07 km^{2} (46.75 sq mi). The sanctuary includes a Medicinal Plant Conservation Area at Thaniparai. 69 plant species belonging to 58 taxa and 42 families are used by the Paliyan tribal people, living in the sanctuary, to treat 15 ailments.

== Conservation ==
The conservation problems affecting the sanctuary are human-elephant conflict, human encroachment, cattle grazing and forest fire. Within the sanctuary, there are 7 to 10 temples which attract thousands of pilgrims every year. Water scarcity is a major problem during dry season due to lack of perennial water source.

Measures have been taken to conserve the wildlife in the sanctuary. The entry of cattle into the sanctuary is prevented, particularly in Kottamalai and Watrap. Leases for collection of fruits and minor forest produce have been stopped to increase the food sources. Tree planting, soil conservation and water harvesting have been undertaken to improve the habitat. The possibility of an elephant corridor could be studied by tracking elephants using radio collars.

== Accessibility ==
The sanctuary is 45 km away from Virudhunagar town and about 75–80 km away from Madurai city. Srivilliputtur railway station is situated 5 km way from the sanctuary. Forest rest houses are available at Mudungiar, Pudupatti and Mudaliaroothu. There are many private lodges near the sanctuary.

There are no roads inside the sanctuary and hence visitors must cover it on foot. Guides are available on request from the sanctuary office to accompany tourists on treks.

== See also ==
- Srivilliputhur
