= List of protected areas of Uttar Pradesh =

This is list of the protected areas of Uttar Pradesh, a central state of India bordering Nepal.

== National parks ==
There is only 1 national park located within Uttar Pradesh.

- Dudhwa National Park

== Wildlife sanctuaries ==
There are total of 25 wildlife sanctuaries in Uttar Pradesh

- Sarsai Nawar Wetland, Sarsai Nawar, Etawah district.
- Bakhira Sanctuary, Sant Kabir Nagar district
- Chandra Prabha Wildlife Sanctuary, Chandauli district
- Hastinapur Wildlife Sanctuary, Amroha, Bijnor, Ghaziabad, Meerut, and Muzzafarnagar districts
- Kachhua Sanctuary, Varanasi district
- Kaimoor Sanctuary, Mirzapur and Sonbhadra districts
- Katarniaghat Wildlife Sanctuary, Bahraich district
- Kishanpur Wildlife Sanctuary, Lakhimpur Kheri district
- Lakh Bahosi Sanctuary, Kannauj district
- Mahavir Swami Sanctuary, Lalitpur district
- National Chambal Wildlife Sanctuary, Agra and Etawah districts
- Nawabganj Bird Sanctuary, Unnao district
- Okhla Sanctuary, Ghaziabad, and Gautam Buddha Nagar districts
- Parvati Arga Bird Sanctuary, Gonda district
- Patna Bird Sanctuary, Etah district
- Ranipur Sanctuary, Banda and Chitrakoot districts
- Saman Sanctuary, Mainpuri district
- Samaspur Sanctuary, Rae Bareli district
- Sandi Bird Sanctuary, Hardoi district
- Sohagi Barwa Sanctuary, Maharajganj district
- Suhelva Sanctuary, Balrampur, Gonda, and Shravasti districts
- Sur Sarovar Sanctuary, Agra district
- Suraha Tal Sanctuary, Ballia district
- Vijai Sagar Sanctuary, Mahoba district

== Tiger Reserves ==
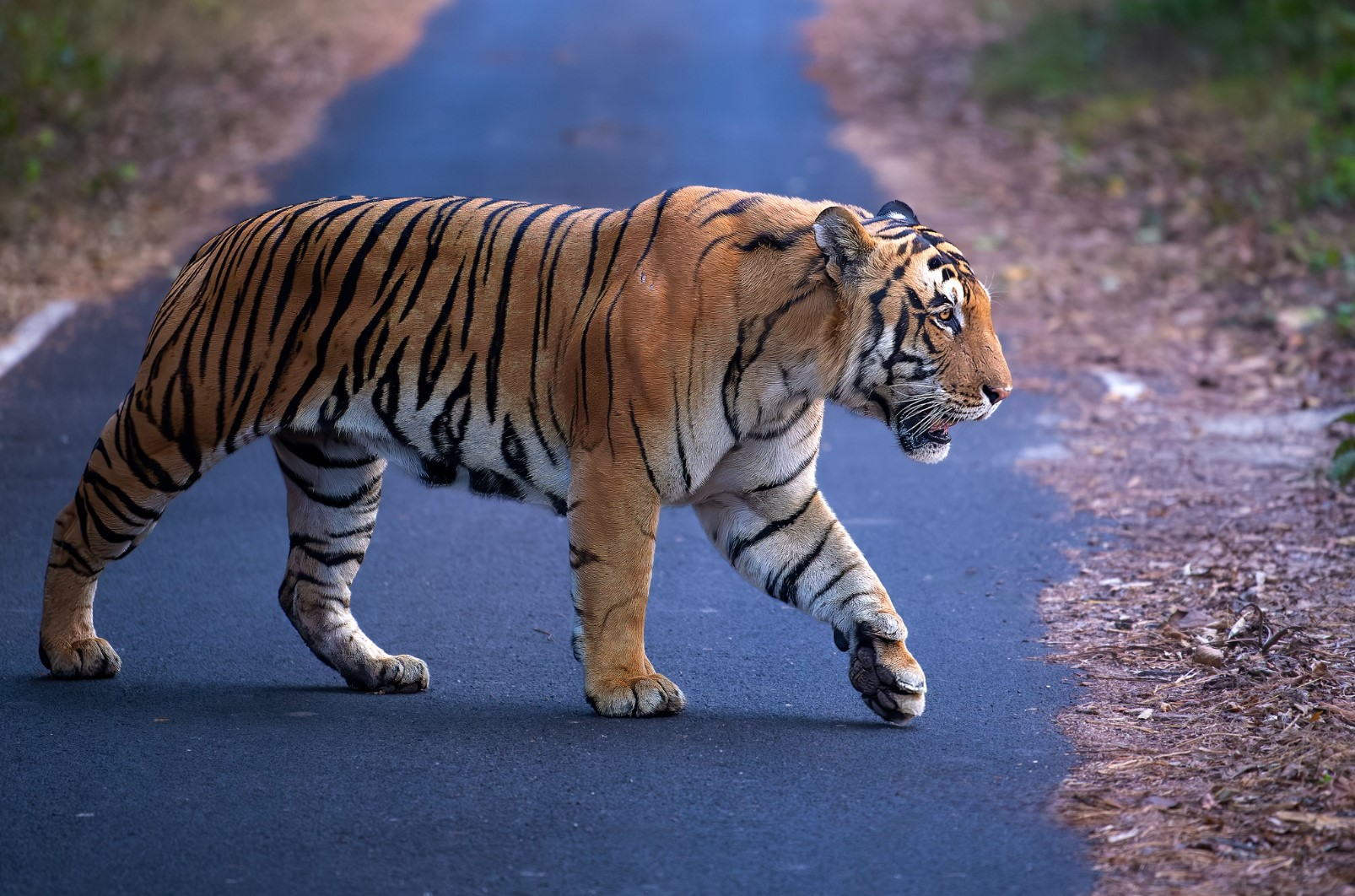
Rocket, a Bengal tiger on the pakki patri area at Pilibhit Tiger Reserve

- Dudhwa Tiger Reserve is made up of
  - Dudhwa National Park
  - Kishanpur Wildlife Sanctuary, Lakhimpur Kheri district
  - Katarniaghat Wildlife Sanctuary, Bahraich district
- Pilibhit Tiger Reserve, Pilibhit district
- Amangarh Tiger Reserve, Bijnor district
- Ranipur Tiger Reserve, Chitrakoot district

== Safari Park ==
- Etawah Safari Park, Etawah

== See also ==
- Allen Forest Zoo
- Lucknow Zoo
