= Amangarh Tiger Reserve =

Tiger Reserve in India

- IUCN category IV (habitat/species management area)
- Location within Uttar Pradesh Location within India
- Location: Bijnor district, Uttar Pradesh, India
- Nearest city: Bijnor
- Coordinates: 29°34′00″N 78°37′00″E
- Area: 95 km^{2} (37 sq mi)
- Established: 2012

New Jim Corbett Park also known as Amangarh Tiger Reserve, is a Tiger Reserve under Project Tiger in India. It is in Amangarh in Bijnor district in the state of Uttar Pradesh. It has an area of 95 km^{2} and is one among the four Tiger Reserves in Uttar Pradesh, the other three being Dudhwa Tiger Reserve, Pilibhit Tiger Reserve and Ranipur Tiger Reserve. It is home to tigers, elephants and a wide variety of other wild animals.

== History ==
Amangarh Tiger Reserve was originally part of the famed Jim Corbett National Park, and after the state of Uttarakhand was carved out of Uttar Pradesh, Jim Corbett went to Uttarakhand and Amangarh remained in Uttar Pradesh. Amangarh Tiger reserve forms an extension of and buffer to Jim Corbett National Park. It was notified in 2012 as a Tiger Reserve. There was no human settlement inside this zone, hence the notification was easier.

Declaration of this zone as a Tiger Reserve would go a long way in conservation efforts in Uttar Pradesh as the area would henceforth get central funds and attention from National Tiger Conservation Authority and lead to more effective management and security of this zone.
