= Tigers in India =

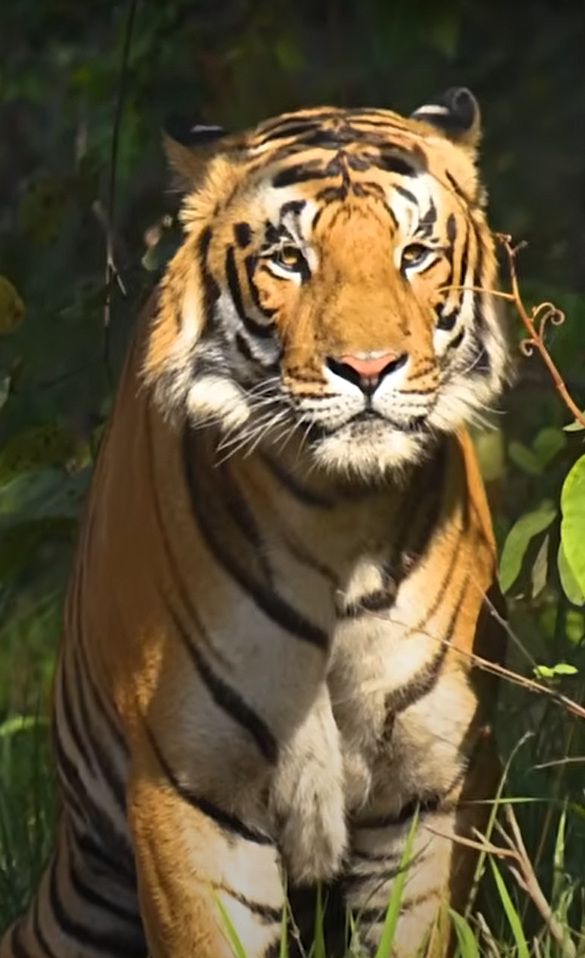
S3 also known as Kulhadi Ram or "Axe"- a dominant male tiger in Pilibhit Tiger Reserve, Uttar Pradesh

Tigers in India constituted more than 75% of the global tiger population as of 2025. India operates 58 tiger reserves. Tigers are the national animal there.

India is one of the founding members of the intergovernmental platform of Tiger Range Countries – Global Tiger Forum. With a global share of 17% of the human population and 18% of the livestock population inhabiting 2.4% of the world's land, India has conserved the world's largest population of free range wild tigers, combatting a century of decline. Initiatives in the form of amendments to the Wildlife Protection Act created the "National Tiger Conservation Authority", delineated Core Areas in Tiger Reserves and incentivised voluntary relocation programs, among many that are critical in protecting tiger populations, biodiversity, and ecosystem services of their inhabitat.

The Project Tiger Division under Ministry of Environment, Forest and Climate Change is dedicated to conservation efforts. In 2022, the 54th tiger reserve in India was declared in Ranipur Wildlife Sanctuary, in the Indian state of Uttar Pradesh, the state's fourth tiger reserve.

Tigers are present in multiple Indian landscapes. Some have a rich and viable population with adequate habitat. Others are prone to human interference, but retain the potential to support their tiger population. Still other habitats with a once thriving tiger population later disappeared. As of 2020, it waas estimated that nearly 30% of the tiger population lives outside the Tiger Reserves. India achieved its target of doubling its population (TX2) ahead of its committed time-frame. Tiger habitat increased by 30% between 2006 and 2018 to about 138,200 km^{2} (53,400 sq mi), mainly by controlling poaching, extending protected areas, fostering coexistence in multi-use areas, and offering economic incentives to local people.

== Common names ==
In India, tigers are known by various names in different languages:

- Hindi: Bāgh (बाघ)
- Bengali: Bāgh (বাঘ)
- Gujarati: Vāgh (વાઘ)
- Kannada: Huli (ಹುಲಿ)
- Malayalam: Kaduva (കടുവ)
- Marathi: Vāgh (वाघ)
- Manipuri: Kei (কৈ)
- Odia: Bāgha (ବାଘ)
- Punjabi: Śēr (ਸ਼ੇਰ)
- Sanskrit: Vyāghra, Śārdūla (व्याघ्र, शार्दूल)
- Tamil and Telugu: Puli (புலி)
- Tulu: Pili (ಪಿಲಿ)
- Urdu: Śer (شیر)

== Bengal Tigers ==
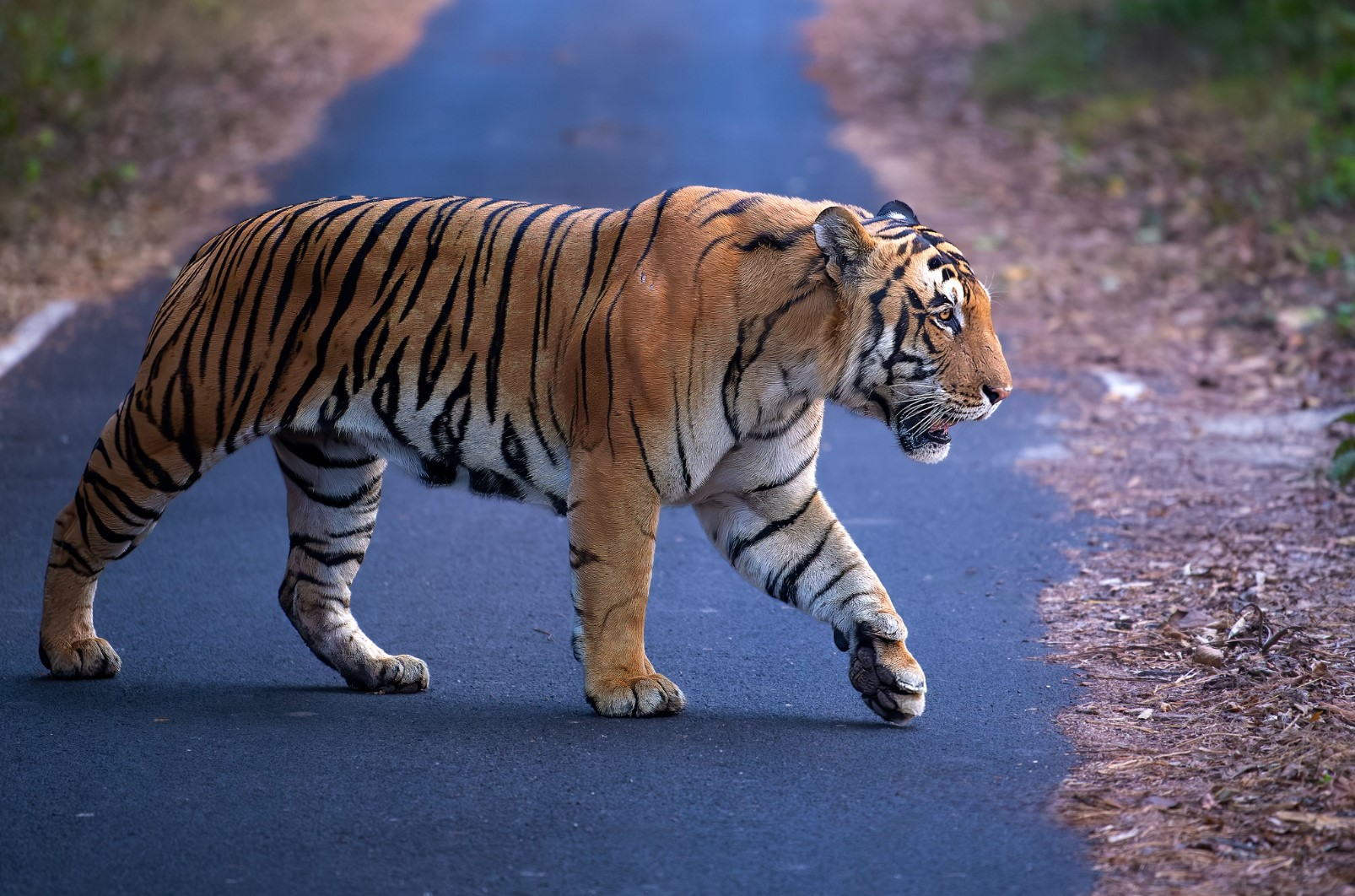
S2 also known as Bhagoda, a Bengal tiger on the pakki patri area at Pilibhit Tiger Reserve

The Bengal Tiger (Panthera tigris tigris) is the species found across most of the country except in Thar Desert, Ladakh, Jammu and Kashmir, Punjab and Kutch regions). They have the largest bodies among the Felidae family, and are also called Royal Bengal Tigers. Hides measuring up to 4 meters are recorded. From nose to tip of the tail, they can measure up to 3 meters and weigh up to 280 kilograms, with males heavier than females. Their life expectancy is about 15 years. However, they can survive for up to 20 years in the wild. They are solitary and territorial.

Tigers in India usually hunt chital (Axis axis), sambar (Cervus unicolor), barasingha (Cervus duvacelii), wild buffalo (Bubalis arnee) nilgai (Boselaphus tragocamelus) and gaur (Bos gaurus) and other animals such as the wild pig (Sus scrofa) and even other predators such as leopards and bears. Elephant calves (Elephas maximus) may be prey.

The tiger is estimated to have been present in India since the Late Pleistocene, 12,000 to 16,500 years ago. Tigers are found in 20 Indian states occupying habitats including grasslands, mangrove swamps, tropical and sub-tropical forests, as well as shola forest systems and from plains to mountains over 6000 feet.

Tigers are found across 12 regional tiger conservation landscapes (TCLs). India is home to 6 global priority TCLs, harboring more than 60% of the global genetic variation in tigers.

The tiger is classified as Endangered on the IUCN's Red List of Threatened Species.

=== Description ===
The tiger is a large, heavy cat. Its coat is predominantly reddish-orange (pale yellow ochre to burnt sienna) with black stripes arranged irregularly and smooth, short hair. The ventral parts including chin, throat, breast and belly are generally white with black stripes. In some tigers, brows and cheeks are white. Males have longer whiskers. Tigers in the plains tend to grow bigger than those in hilly areas. Tigers measuring up to 12 feet were frequently recorded in the early 20th century.

Contemporaneous accounts mention 12 foot-long tigers in 1861 with a hide allegedly 13 feet 5 inches long. Many tigers over 10 feet were killed during British rule. Reduction of the gene-pool due to excessive hunting is a likely cause of the smaller size of 21st century tigers.

Tigers are good swimmers. They can endure thirst. Sanderson recorded two wounded tigers caught in a net during hot weather who survived without water for 10 days. Tigers cannot climb but claw markings on tree bark reach up to 10 feet. Tigers are cannibals and scavengers. Enthusiastic 19th-century tiger-hunter Alexander Angus Airlie Kinloch observed:

Unless provoked, the tiger will rarely attack a man, but does his best to get away quickly.

== Culture ==
The fifth parva of the epic poem Mahābhārata, Udyoga Parva, includes one shloka that reads:

निर्वनो वध्यते व्याघ्रो निर्व्याघ्रं छिद्यते वनम् ।
तस्माद्व्याघ्रो वनं रक्षेद्वनं व्याघ्रं च पालयेत् ॥
nirvanō vadhyatē vyāghrō nirvyāghraṁ chidyatē vanam
tasmādvyāghrō vanaṁ rakṣēdvanaṁ vyāghraṁ ca pālayēt.

which can be translated as

Do not cut down that forest with its tigers! Let not the tigers be driven from that forest! There can be no forest without tigers, and no tigers without a forest. The forest shelters the tigers and tigers guard the forest!

The tiger is admired and feared in Indian mythology. Goddess Shakti (Durga) rides on the tiger. Deities such as Dingu-Aneni (in North-East India), Bonbibi (in West Bengal), Sabarimala Ayyappan (in Kerala), Huliraya (in Karnataka), Vaghdeo or Vaghoba (in Maharashtra) and Chandraghanta are associated and venerated with tiger. Puranas and folklore often mention tiger as vahana. The Matsya Purana, while narrating Shiva's marriage with Sati, describes some of the Ganas, Shiva's attendants, who resemble a tiger. Harivamsa Purana often uses tiger qualities as adjectives.

One Buddhist mythical tale suggested that Gautama Buddha in a past incarnation presented himself to a tigress as food as she was about to cannibalize her own cubs. This highlights compassion, the greatest virtue in Buddhist philosophy. Taoism depicts tiger as a prominent temple element.

Tiger images can be seen in mesolithic cave paintings found in Bhimbetka rock shelters. Tiger featured on seals discovered in Mohenjodaro and Kalibangan shows its significance in Indus civilization and culture. The earliest known pictorial depiction of Shiva wearing tiger hide are from Kushana Period. Tigers hold cultural significance for many adivasis in India. Kharia, Bhaina, Savar (or Saur), Parja, and Kusro in Madhya Pradesh have totems of tiger. Baigas consider tigers as their brother. Gonds are known for propitiating the tiger, which they see as a protector. Korku worships Baghdeo (tiger god). For the Murias, Chitan Deo (tiger god) is the god of good hunting. Bhagashwar (tiger god) is worshiped by the Bharias who believe that they will not be killed by a tiger. Koyas people consider Konarzu to be their tiger god. Tribal people who share their lands with tigers consider them to be sacred.

Tiger hunting by Islamic Invaders can be traced to Mughal cultural links with Mongol and Timurid ancestry which practiced cat hunting (lions, in their region) as a ritual "to formalise any kind of authority" and considered killing them as a good omen. Conversely, if the hunt was unsuccessful and the animal escaped, it would invite trouble.

Naturalists observed that tigers were regarded by locals with awe that prevented killing them by locals, even when they had power. European religious magazines and publications played a crucial role in introducing tigers to their audiences. English missionaries passing through jungles might encounter what they called the "most savage and destructive of animals". Many were killed by tigers. Then would ask their readers:

What do you think it was? Why, it was the body of the poor man who had been killed. ... It was, indeed, a horrid and painful sight, and one which I shall never forget. On looking at it my blood seems to curdle in my veins. ... Youthful reader, did you ever feel thankful that you were born in a country where you are not in danger of being killed and eaten by those cruel and blood thirsty beasts?

Missionaries also noted:

In many places, the inhabitants appear to have resigned the dominion to the tigers, and take few precautions against them; regarding them as sacred.

The popular myth that tigers are known to suck the blood of prey was disproved in the early 20th century.

Traditionally, India has had a culture of conserving forests and wildlife.

== History ==
Arthashastra, a political treatise authored by Kautilya more than two thousand years ago, mentions vyaala vana (wildlife and tiger reserve), a protected area in the kingdom by Royal Command. King Ashoka of the Maurya Empire rejected hunting as a royal hobby.

Humans and tigers have co-existed for millennia. Tigers are elusive and avoid humans under normal circumstances, but may charge when wounded or to protect cubs. Tigers have attacked humans and cattle, leading some villages to be abandoned. Killing was not seen as a solution. Instead, tigers were revered in many places.

The British and some native rulers viewed capturing/hunting tigers as a symbol of masculinity. Tigers were seen as a "merciless blood sucking beast" justifying kingship and empire. Hunting was a "Royal Privilege" for Mughals through which they demonstrate their authority over the natural world. This sport portrayed rulers as heroes capable of slaying the fiercest of beasts. The weapons employed by the British Raj and the popularity of hunting reduced the tiger population. Hunting events were chronicled in personal diaries, memoirs, official gazetteers and photographs. The British enacted the Forest Act of 1878 which treated forest as hunting ground for tigers that they labelled vermin. Hunting was dangerous, and was considered a manly feat. Photos of British royalty beside tiger carcasses during the late 19th and early 20th centuries symbolized British dominance.

In the early 19th century, Bishop Heber wrote a poem that mentioned tigers:

Our task is done! On Ganga's Breast
The sun is sinking down to rest;
And moor'd beneath the tamarind bough,
Our bark has found its harbour now.
With furled sail and painted side,
Behold the tiny frigate ride.
Upon her deck, mid-charcoal gleams,
The Muslim's savoury supper steams,
While all apart, beneath the wood,
The Hindu cooks his simpler food.
Come walk with me the jungle through;
If yonder hunter told us true,
Far off, in the desert dank and rude, The Tiger holds his solitude;
Nor taught by secret charm to shun
The thunders of the english gun;
A dreadful guest but rarely seen,
Returns to scare the village green.

A manager at Isaac A. Van Amburgh's menagerie mentioned tigers:

... Glutting himself with the blood of his victims, he is a fit emblem of cruelty. ... though gutted with slaughter, (tiger) is not satisfied - but continues the carnage and seems to have its courage only inflamed by not finding resistance. He is the only animal whose spirit seems untamable: neither force nor constraint, violence or flattery can prevail in the least on his stubborn nature. The caresses of the keeper have no influence on his heart of iron; and time, instead of mollifying its disposition only serves to increase its fierceness and malignity. The tiger snaps at the hand that feeds it, as well as that by which it is chastised - every object seems considered only as its proper prey, which it devours with a look, although confined by bars and chains, still makes fruitless efforts as if to show its malignity when incapable of exerting its force. ... In short the beast may be said to be possessed of a devil, and no human power can instill into him the attributes of love and kindness.

Deforestation during the British empire provided timber for railways. British rulers established postal services. To speed delivery, postmen crossed jungles then undisturbed by humans. These actions affected the natural world as well. Postmen were occasionally attacked by tigers who were labeled Man-Eaters and hunted.

British rulers often came up with a book narrating their killing of tigers. These books shaped the perception of Europeans who believed that killing tigers was a favor to the native population. Lieutenant Colonel Frank Sheffield in his book How I Killed the Tiger wrote,

I had the satisfaction of knowing that I had rid the community of dangerous pest. The tiger in India is looked upon as a common enemy. All classes are in mortal dread of him. ... There is, therefore, great rejoicing over the death of a tiger

The British press highlighted these incidents. Opinions appeared in Daily Chronicle, United Service Gazette, The Field, Daily News, The Graphic, Land and Water, Examiner, Standard, Hampstead & Highgate Express, The Guardian, The Daily Telegraph and The Navy and Army Illustrated among others. When an adult tiger was killed, cubs were caught and sailed to Britain. Tigers were kept as pets by a few Englishmen.

In October 1857 a tigress escaped from Charles Jamrach. A 9-year-old boy playing on the street was attacked and rescued. This tigress escaped to kill a lion in Edmond's menagerie.

Tiger fights were held in Lucknow during the reign of king Wajid Ali Shah of Awadh and a dozen tigers were sold for ten rupees each.

In 1986, a study reported that tigers were declining rapidly.

Chennai was once known as Puliyur (Tiger Town). Mumbai recorded tigers until 1929. Major cities along the river Yamuna such as Delhi and Agra once had tigers roaming in neighboring jungles.

After Indian Independence, East Pakistan (present-day Bangladesh) had a population of tigers in the Sundarban Districts of East Bengal. The administration advertised its natural heritage as "a sportsman's paradise". It invited people to "take part in this exciting sport".

Since 2012, records with standardized data of tiger deaths have been maintained by the National Tiger Conservation Authority. From 2017 to 2021, 547 tiger deaths were documented. 393 were due to natural causes, while 25 died due to poisoning, 9 were killed from snaring, 7 were eliminated by shooting, 22 were electrocuted and 33 were poached. 55 dead tigers were seized.

=== Killing ===
Many tigers were killed in medieval and colonial India. Shooting tigers was a "jolly-good sport". Post-independence, India attracted global hobby-hunters who killed many tigers before the Indian government banned the practice in 1972. The trophy-hunting industry in India at the time of the ban was worth $4 million per year (equivalent of $433 million as of 2022).

==== Shikar ====
The Mughal Empire saw a rise in tiger hunting as sport. A Mughal Emperor would invite Mongol, Rajput, Turk and Afghan nobles for Shikar. Indians worshiped and feared them, so they were killed as a mark of supremacy. Akbar preferred hunting tigers with bow and arrow while riding a horse or elephant, while Jahangir, known to have killed 86 tigers, hunted on foot. Jahangirnama claimed Shikar of a total 28,532 animals and 13,964 birds by Jahangir beginning at age 12. Mughals were known to maintain records of their Shikar. Contests such as tiger vs horned buffaloes and tiger vs tiger were common during the era.

Shikar employed Qamargah, a Mongol hunting tactic, in which men served as "beaters" encircling a huge area to flush and trap a tiger in a corral where the ruler would kill the tiger. The hunter typically kept part of a tiger as a trophy or souvenir.

Once Akbar took 4000 soldiers with him for Shikar. His courtiers, noblemen and his harem accompanied him. Infrastructure similar to the royal palace was created in the jungle. Sometimes, Shikar continued for months. Many paintings hailed the ruler. Cock-fights and duelling of pigeons and rams were practiced whenever the king felt bored. Falcons and Cheetahs were reared as pets to help make Shikar a success.

The princely state of Hyderabad had many tigers. Dignitaries visiting the Nizam went on Shikar. At the jubilee celebration of Nizam, the prince gifted one guest 35 tiger pelts.

==== Big-Game Hunting ====
Lydekker wrote, "Tiger is so intimately associated with the characteristic of India that it will always - and rightly - be regarded as the special emblem of that country."

British saw the killing of tigers as an act of imperial dominance. For colonial rulers and British officers, March, April and May made up tiger-hunting season as the grass dried out during summer, leaving tigers easier to spot. Big-game hunts typically killed around 9 tigers on an average day. They employed Shikaris (chief native trackers), beaters, with elephants and mahouts (elephant handlers). The beaters were paid by the day, with a gratuity if a tiger is killed. An ordinary beater received three to four paise/day, with double that amount when there was a kill. They generally numbered fifty or sixty. Their leaders received double the above sums.

The roots of tiger hunting may be understood via an incident in 1812 - when a party of British officers dining in a jungle near Madras was attacked by a tiger - one officer was killed. This created fear among the British. In another instance, in 1792, the son of Sir Hector Munro was killed by a tiger while he was hunting deer. Sir Hector sought revenge by officially authorizing the mass killing of tigers. Many officers were badly wounded or killed in the process. This led other officers to target the tiger.

British rulers directed locals to clear forests for timber and agriculture. This increased the chances of man-tiger encounters, which was otherwise rare. Only forest dwellers came in contact with typically shy and solitary tigers, with few attacks. Loss of habitat and reduced prey often pushed tigers into human settlements.

British Army Lieutenant William Rice in his journal published in 1857 mentions his "bag" consisted of 156 heads of "large game" including 98 tigers, one of which measured 11 feet 11 inches. He described them as "fearful ravages", "rapacious pests", "India infested with wild beasts" while equating their existence to "notorious evils" requiring "remedy" and aiming to "exterminate such brutes". Rice described tiger-shooting as the most exciting and glorious sport this world affords and wrote:

I enjoyed splendid opportunities of observing the habits of these animals and ascertaining how they may best be killed.

==== Poaching ====
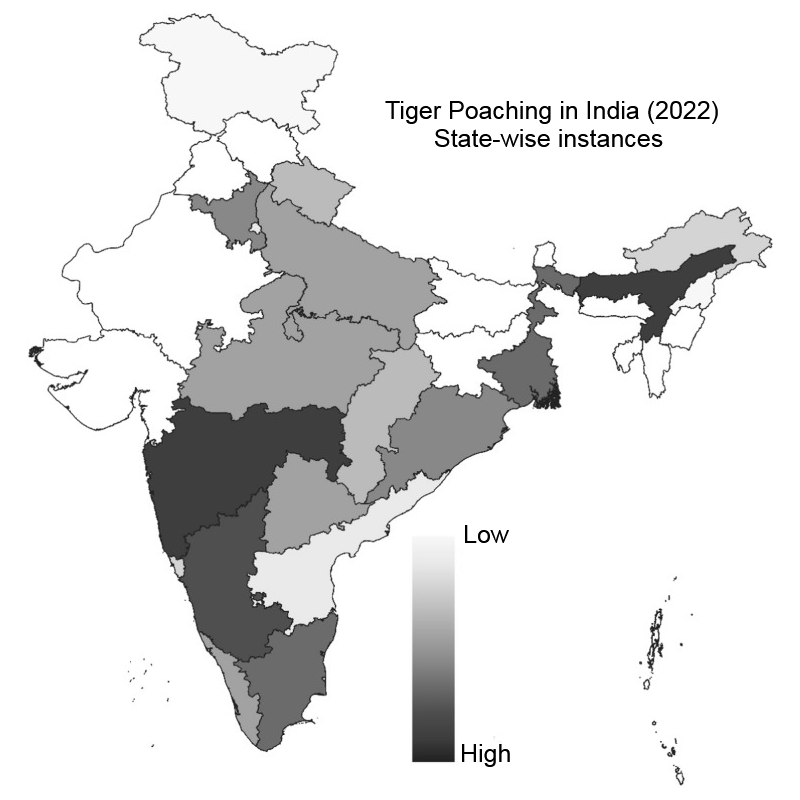
State-wise Tiger Poaching Instances 2022

Poachers kill tigers for body parts including hide, teeth, and claws, which are used in Chinese traditional medicine and to display. A tigress scent-marks her vicinity with pungent fluid to announce her fertility to nearby males who compete for her. This leaves her vulnerable to poaching. Some brothels in these countries sell a sweet liquor steeped in tiger penis. Poachers take advantage of man-tiger conflicts with the help of troubled locals.

The earliest available records report high demand for tiger parts among the English. In 1886, tiger parts were traded in European markets with hides sold for nearly £6 (equivalent to 600 pound sterling in 2022) while a claw fetched about 5 shillings (equivalent to £25 in 2022). Tigers exceeding 11 feet were of higher value.

In the 1950s, a tiger pelt was sold for $50 in India. Exports and fashion trends and demands led tiger hide rugs and coats to be sold for $10,000 in the U.S. and Europe during the 1960s. Around 1,000 kg (2,200 pounds) of bones (estimated to be from 80 tigers) were seized in August 1993 in Delhi. The shipment was to be smuggled into China.

By June 2004, none of the tigers in Sariska Tiger Reserve survived. However, government records claimed the presence of 18 tigers. This exposed corruption and neglect in the Rajasthan Forest Department. Funds meant for conservation were redirected by the state government. Arrest of poachers revealed that killing tigers in Sariska was easy as the guards' walkie-talkies were non-functional and the posts at wildlife areas normally manned by some 300 guards had been abandoned during monsoon season, providing access to the tiger reserve. Security personnel with bamboo sticks or obsolete British era Lee-Enfield rifles often encountered poachers carrying assault rifles and AK-47s.

Tiger hide was most sought after for ceremonial clothing in China-controlled Tibet. However, this practice ended when the Dalai Lama denounced ceremonial clothing made of tiger and leopard hide. In 2006, reports emerged showing Chinese police officers laughing and posing with people wearing tiger hide clothing. These were sold in China in violation of the UN trade ban. It was reported that China was considering lifting the ban on bones of farmed tigers, problematic since the bones could not be distinguished from those of wild tigers. The report showed Chinese businessmen purchasing tiger hide for home decor.

Certain communities in India are known for making fake tiger claws using the bones of livestock due to their high demand and value. A 2018 survey showed significant poaching at Amdarbad, Dampa, Dudhwa, Kanha, Melghat, Nagarhole, Palamau, Pench, Rajaji, Srisailam (NSTR) and Udanti-Sitanadi Tiger Reserves.

On 1 April 1973, Accordingly, the Government of India launched Project Tiger. Project implementation highlighted the need for institutional mechanisms with administrative powers and legal backing. The National Tiger Conservation Authority (NTCA) was created on 4 September 2006.

==== Avni ====
On 2 November 2018, a tigress named Avni (officially known as T1, aged 6) with two 10-month-old cubs was killed near Borati village in the Yavatmal forests after more than a month-long search operation by Ashgar Ali Khan, son of India's most famous hunter, Nawab Shafath Ali Khan. She was accused of the death of 13 locals since June 2016. This forest had no records of tigers and is a 170 km^{2} part of greater Vidarbha tiger landscape near the Tipeshwar wildlife sanctuary. Forensic investigation and DNA analysis linked Avni to 5 of the 13 people who died in an animal attack. All efforts to find the tigress with sniffer dogs, tthermal Imaging drones, elephant patrols and lures using cologne were unsuccessful due to the heavy growth of Lantana camara, which made it easy for her to hide. Apparently, citizens appealed to President Ram Nath Kovind and Prime Minister Narendra Modi to protect the tigress campaigning on #LetAvniLive. Post-mortem reports suggested she was killed by single bullet and no attempts were made to tranquilize or capture her. Forest department personnel were trained with tranquilising guns to capture her alive.

Many standard protocols were violated:

The orders were issued in the name of the father but his son shot the tigress. (2) Such operations begin with sunrise and end at sunset. Tigress was killed in the Night. (3) At time of killing, wildlife veterinarian or any senior forest department official were not present with the hunting team. (4) In a statement, the team mentioned attempt to tranquilize the tigress failed and when she attacked, the person shot the tigress in self defense. How the "scheduled drug" used to sedate the tigress was handled in absence of a trained vet or wildlife expert raises doubts. (5) Spot panchanama suggests the possibility of manual piercing of dart into the hide. (6) Tigress body had no signs of resistance.

In 2022 India signed conservation bilateral agreements with China, Cambodia, Bangladesh, Nepal, Bhutan, Myanmar and Russia.

Areas with reduced/no tiger density in 2022 led NTCA to release Tiger Reintroduction and Supplementation in Wild Protocol to guide recovery efforts.

== Habitat and ecology ==
Tigers inhabit only 13 countries - India, Bangladesh, Bhutan, Nepal, Myanmar, Cambodia, China, Indonesia, Lao People's Democratic Republic, Malaysia, Russia, Thailand, and Vietnam.Only 8 of them have tigers who breed in the wild. India, Nepal, and Russia are the only countries that have increased their tiger population through conservation. As of 2022, tigers were likely extinct in Cambodia, Lao PDR, and Vietnam.

Tigers can survive in high mountains, mangroves swamps, tall grasslands, deciduous and evergreen forests. Their coats provide camouflage. Tigers require a large territory, determined by the availability of prey. It marks territory by urine, feces, rakes, scrapes, and vocalizing. Tigers compete for space with humans. They use landscape features such as dirt roads, trails, foot paths, riverbeds and nullahs which often lead to public sightings.

=== Landscapes ===
India has five tiger-occupied complexes with unique geographical features.

==== Shivalik Hills and Gangetic Plains ====
With an average width of 60 km and stretching nearly 900 km from Yamuna and Sharda in the west to Valmiki Tiger Reserve in the east, Shivalik and the Gangetic Plains landscapes consist of three parallel geological zones - the Shivaliks, the bhabar tract and the terai plains ranging from Uttarakhand, Uttar Pradesh to Bihar. Shivaliks are mountains with elevation up to 1500 m situated between the Himalayas and Indus-Gangetic-Brahmaputra-Irrawaddy plains. Streams from Shivalik enter underground in the bhabhar region and re-emerge in the terai zone, marked by annual flooding, high water table, shifting floodplains, swampy areas, and abundant tall grass species. India and Nepal share the forests in the terai region. Bhutan is a significant part of this zone. This requires trans-national co-operation.

The density of tiger population (up to 15 tigers per 100 km^{2}.) there is attributed to the more than 15,000 km^{2} forested area with ample prey, such as:

- Cervids - Kaakad (Muntiacus muntjak), Chital (Axis axis), Hog Deer (Axis porcinus), Sambar (Rusa unicolor) and the Barasingha (Rucervus duvaucelii)
- Bovids - Blackbuck (Antilope cervicapra), Chousingha (Tetracerus quadricornis), Gaur (Bos gaurus), Goral (Naemorhedus goral), Serow (Capricornis thar) and Nilgai (Boselaphus tragocamelus)
- Other Mammals - One-horned Rhinoceros (Rhinoceros unicornis) and Wild Boar (Sus scrofa)

==== Central India and Eastern Ghats ====
The Central Indian and Eastern Ghats landscape includes all the area from semi-arid zone of Rajasthan, central Indian plateau of Madhya Pradesh, Chhattisgarh, Jharkhand, Maharashtra (along with part of Sahyadris), and Odisha to parts of the Eastern Ghats in Andhra Pradesh, Telangana, and Odisha. A step-like geological formation can be seen at Chhota Nagpur Plateau (consisting of Hazaribagh, Ranchi and Koderma plateaus) along with the hills of Aravalli, Satpura and those in Eastern Ghats which range from 200 m to 1300 m. This terrain with patches of shallow, infertile soils is a natural deterrent for extensive cultivation, leaving many areas in this landscape forested. However, the traditional connection between ancient forests in Eastern Ghats with primitive forests of Central India along the Chhota Nagpur plateau is near extinction.

A network of Protected Areas with nearly half of the total Tiger Reserves of India occupies this landscape. Peninsular forests transition into Thar Desert through a semi-arid region located between northwestern Madhya Pradesh and Eastern Rajasthan. This habitat supports high biodiversity and tiger abundance. The landscape is undergoing massive degradation due to mining, infrastructure development and insurgency.

Wildlife habitats there are the most fragmented in India. With four tiger populations of more than 100 members each (Kanha-Pench Block hosts more than 300) this landscape is home to endemic species such as Indian Wild Buffalo (Bubalus arnee) and Hard Ground Barasingha (Rucervus duvacelli branderi). Other common prey animals there are Blackbuck (Antilope cervicapra), Barking deer (Muntiacus muntjak), Chinkara (Gazella benetti), Chital (Axis axis), Chowsingha (Tetracerus quadricornis), Gaur (Bos gaurus), Mouse Deer (Moschiola indica), Nilgai (Boselaphus tragocamelus), Sambar (Rusa unicolor), Wild Pig (Sus scrofa).

==== The Western Ghats ====
Stretching from the River Tapi in North, running parallel to the Arabian Sea coast across over 1600 km to Kanyakumari in South, the Western Ghats landscape ranges from Goa, Karnataka and Kerala to Tamil Nadu. Total forest cover is about 1,01,467 km^{2}. This landscape had 11 official tiger reserves as of 2018. The highest peak at Anaimudi is 2,695 m from sea level. It is a biodiversity hotspot with vegetation ranging from grasslands, montane stunted evergreen forests (shola), tropical wet evergreen forests, moist deciduous to dry deciduous forests and dry thorn forests, is home to about 5,800 species of flowering plants, 500 species of birds and 120 species of mammals with a large number of them being endemic to this region. Illegal quarrying, mining, hydroelectric power projects, deforestation for timber and agricultural output with rampant monoculture, hunting and encroachment have resulted in irreversible habitat loss, and disruption of habitat corridors, thereby interrupting the gene flow in tiger populations. It was estimated (2018) that in Karnataka, hosting India's second highest tiger population of 524 (SE 475 - 573), about 12% of forests have been destroyed since 2000.

==== North Eastern Hills and Brahmaputra Flood Plains ====
North Bengal Dooars, Brahmaputra Flood Plains and North Eastern Hill ranges together constitutes North Eastern Hills and Brahmaputra Flood Plains landscape which includes parts of Northern West Bengal, Assam, Arunachal Pradesh, Mizoram and Nagaland. The fertile plains of Bengal Dooars are in the foothills of eastern Himalayas and have tropical moist forests that extend into the Brahmaputra Valley covering 750 km by 80 km, surrounded by hilly terrain. This region has numerous protected areas, reserved forests and wetlands along the Brahmaputra River. The northeastern hill region consists of eastern Himalayas extending from the Koshi Valley in Central Nepal to northwest Yunan in China and include northeast India along with the hill districts of West Bengal. Garo, Khasi and Jaintia hills form the Meghalaya plateau, while in the southeast, Mizoram includes part of Lushai hills while Tripura has a small chunk. The India-Myanmar border is along the Naga hills, while Assam is home for the Barail Range, Karbi-Anglong hills and Cachar hills.

With fertile land, many rivers and tributaries, the mountains, valleys and plains range from 300 m to 6000 m in altitude. Tropical climate is predominant in valleys and deforestation for agriculture threatens the survival of many endemic species there. Apart from common tiger prey, tigers hunt Himalayan Goral (Naemorhedus goral), Himalayan Serow (Capricornis thar), Red Goral (Naemorhedus baileyi), Bharal (Pseudois nayaur), Brow-Antlered Deer (Cervus eldi eldi), Leaf Deer (Muntiacus putaoensis), Pygmy Hog (Porcula salvania), Ibex (Capra ibex), Great Tibetan Sheep (Ovis ammon hodgsoni) and Tibetan Wild Ass (Equus hemionus kiang). Tigers also hunt Badgers (Arctonyx collaris), Otters (Lutrogale perspicillata) and sometimes baby Elephants (Elephas maximus) and one-horned Rhinoceros (Rhinoceros unicornis).

Including two Tiger Conservation Units (TCUs), nine tiger reserves there are part of the forest area of around 1,70,541 km^{2}. The Tibet Autonomous region of China, Bhutan, Nepal, Bangladesh and Myanmar share borders with this landscape, requiring international cooperation.

==== Sundarban ====
Sundarban consists of mangrove forests in the southern part of West Bengal and extends into Bangladesh. This wetland is a global priority Tiger Conservation Landscape Unit covering more than 10,000 km^{2}. It was declared a World Heritage Site by UNESCO in 1987. Designated Sundarban Biosphere Reserve with 4,266 km^{2} area on the Indian side (34%) is under the highest protection for wildlife in comparison with Sundarban in Bangladesh (66%), where a majority of the area allows harvesting forest produce.

Aquatic systems of the mangrove habitat are productive, hosting 3.6 tigers per 100 km^{2}_{,}. They have adapted to a more saline and pneumatophore-filled existence. This region has many man-eaters. Chital (Axis axis), Wild Pig, Rhesus macaque (Macaca mulatta) and Lesser adjutant stork (Leptoptilos javanicus) are the major prey. Fauna such as Water monitor (Varanus salvator), young Saltwater crocodiles (Crocodylus porosus) and possibly fish are other prey. With rivers serving as natural barriers, tigers swimming across the water channels up to 400 m wide have been recorded. An isolated habitat restricts the gene flow for tigers.

== Population ==
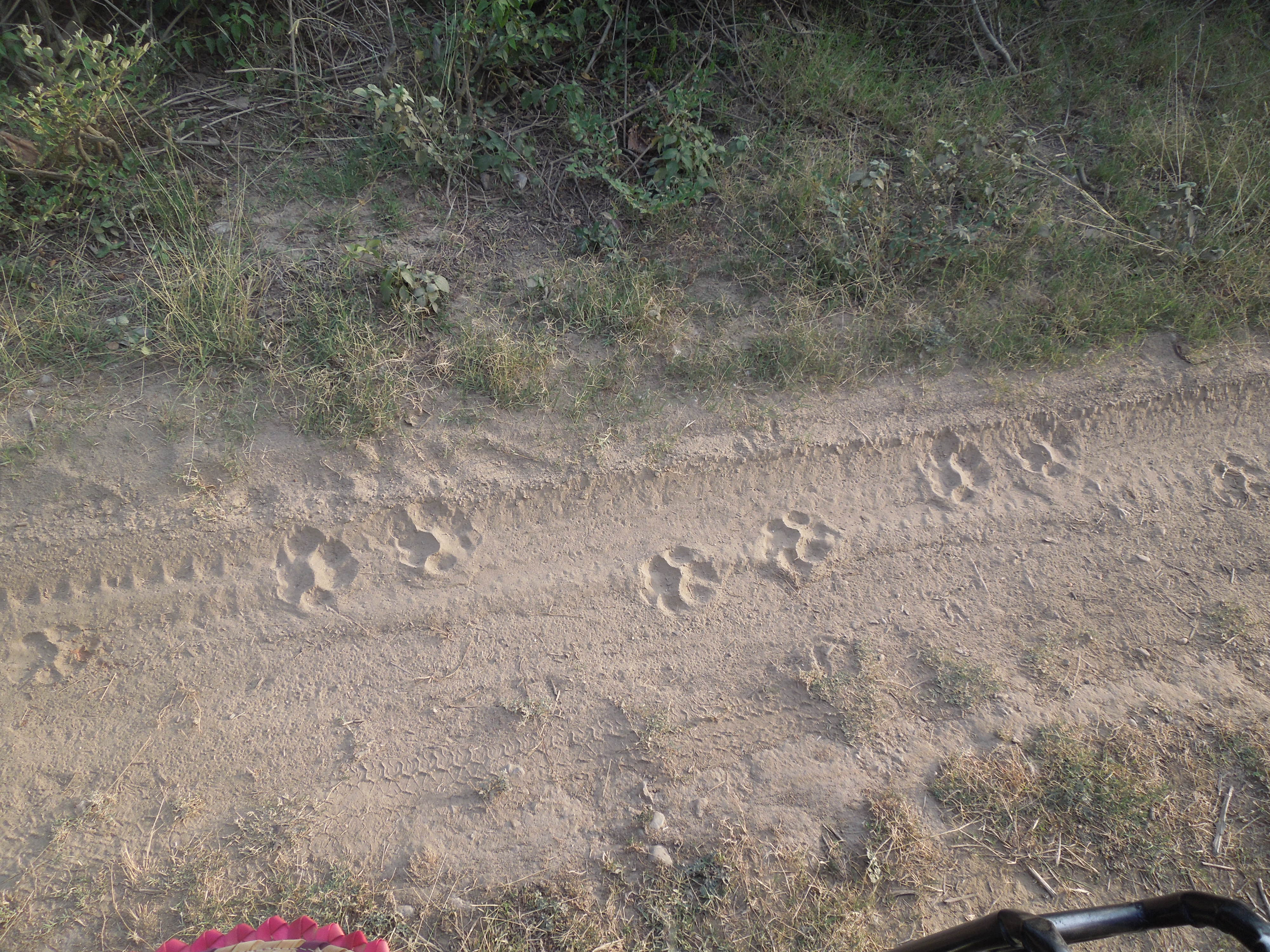
Tiger pugmarks on a dirt road

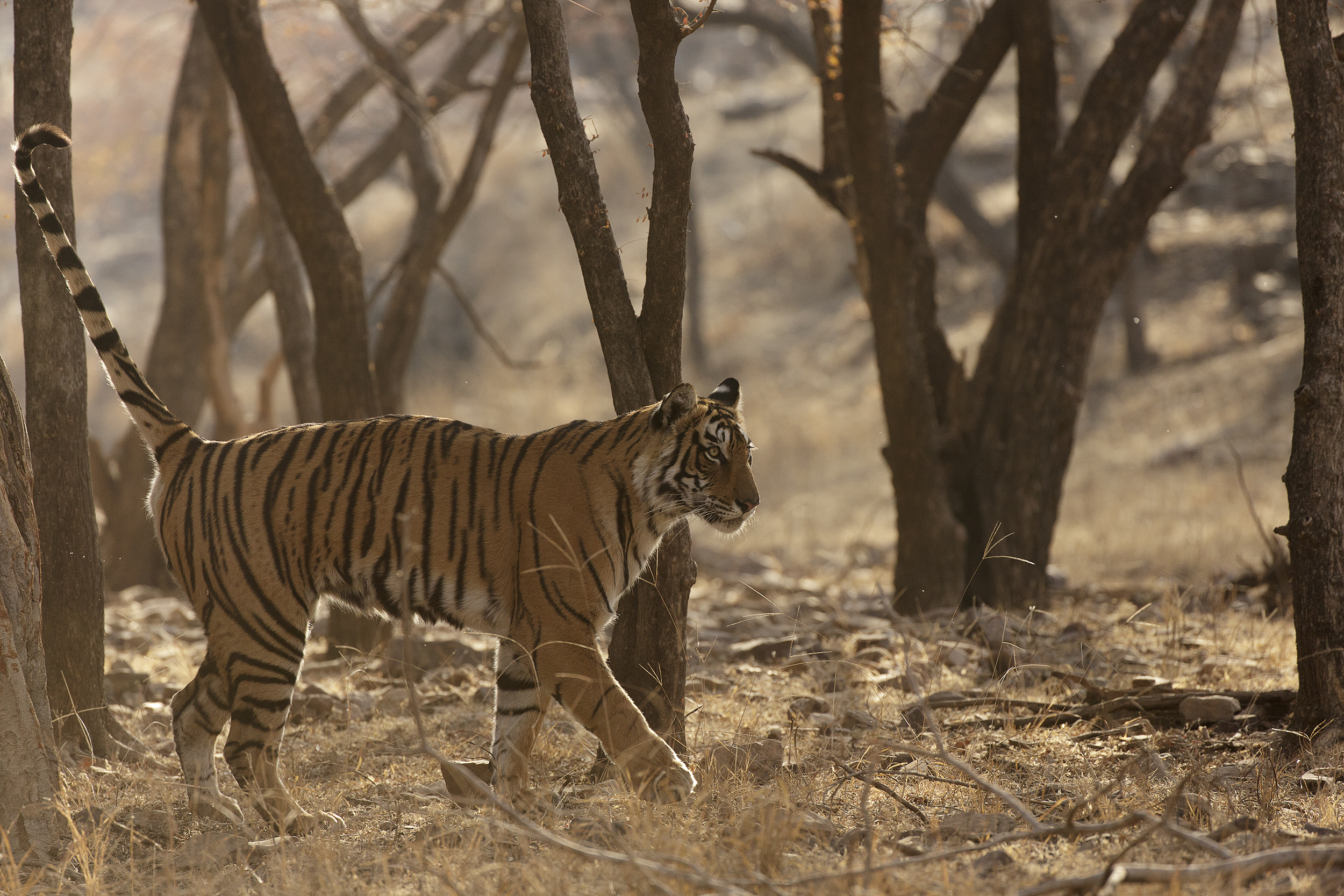
Tiger scent marking its territory

Tiger populations can expand rapidly. Tigers can produce litters of typically 2-3 but up to 6 or 7 cubs after 3.5 months gestation. If the litter is lost, another litter may arrive within five months. Juvenile mortality is high; 50%+ of cubs do not reach reproductive age. Cubs remain with their mothers until age two. Male tigers become sexually active at age four. Tigers live up to 20 years.

At the beginning of the 20th century, 80,000-100,000 Bengal Tigers were believed to live in India. Taxidermists Van Ingen & Van Ingen of Mysore recorded stuffing more than 25,000 tigers in their first 50 years. More than 50,000 tigers were estimated in 1930. Thereafter, estimates fluctuated: 40,000 (1947), initial tiger census: 1,827 (1972), Project Tiger: 3,500 (1990s), 2,967 (2018–19), 3,682 (2025). The latter figure was some 75% of the world population.

Madhya Pradesh (785), Karnataka (563), Uttarakhand (560), Maharashtra (444), and Tamil Nadu (306) have the highest tiger populations. Tadoba Andhari Tiger Reserve with 115 tigers in the 625 km^{2} (241 sq mi) reserve, has the highest population density.

Tiger mortality increased from 88 in 2012 to 127 in 2021.

=== Sign ===
Tiger presence can be confirmed using seven signs:

- Pugmark Trails
- Scats (Old: dry with hair and bones visible, Fresh: dry but intact with shiny surface, Fresh: soft, moist, and smelly)
- Scrapes
- Scent marks (spray, rolling)
- Rake marks on trunks
- Actual sighting
- Roaring

=== Census ===
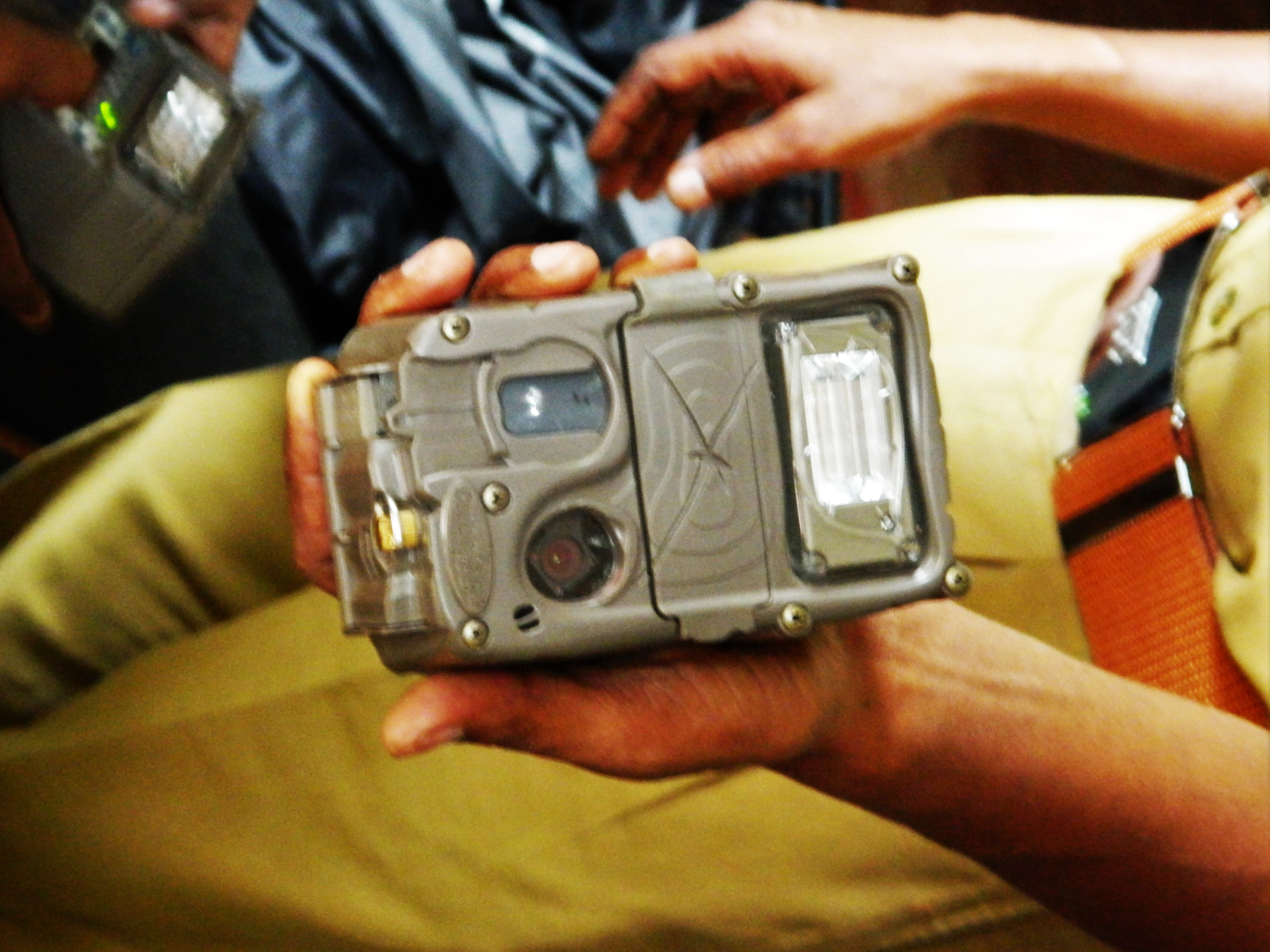
Camera Trap used in estimating the Tiger Population

After the Sariska incident in 2004–05, in which all the tigers were poached, while official records showed tiger presence based on pugmarks, a Tiger Task Force (TTF) was constituted that recommended changes in the population assessment method. Multiple methodologies were used with a lack of uniform data collection that interfered with comparisons. The forest department uses camera traps, GPS, pedometers and other equipment.

The 2018–19 assessment done in 20 states covered 381,400 km^{2} (147,300 sq mi) divided into 317,958 habitat plots. It is considered the largest wildlife survey ever undertaken. 65% of the population (1,923) was found inside reserves. Tiger census repeats every four years. The fifth cycle during 2022 initiated the digital M-STrIPES application.

Population estimates in India since implementation of the new assessment methodologies:

- 2006 - 1,411
- 2010 - 1,706
- 2014 - 2,226
- 2018 - 2,967
- 2022 - 3,682

=== Variants ===
Sometimes a tiger with fur colour other than classical orange appears in India: black tiger, golden tiger or white tiger variants. This polymorphism is genetic. A 2018 survey found camera-trap pictures of a golden tiger in Kaziranga Tiger Reserve and a black phenotype in Similipal Tiger Reserve.

== Conservation ==
As an apex predator, flourishing tigers are indicators of a healthy ecosystem, including herbivores and other carnivores. Survival in the wild is dependent on conservation and management efforts.

=== Stressors ===
Organized poaching due to demand for tiger parts and products is the major threat. However, other stressors also limit their numbers.

==== Habitat Loss ====
When habitat is lost, tigers have less territory to spread across, and their population declines accordingly.

Deforestation is one cause of habitat loss.

Prey reductions increase human-tiger conflicts when tigers enter human populated areas to prey on cattle. Tigers face zoonosis through interaction with domestic animals.

Free ranging dogs near Protected Areas threaten both ungulates (which they hunt) and tigers, as a carrier for infectious diseases such as rabies, parvovirus, and distemper.

Since 1925, tigers have lost almost 93% of their habitat. Increased agriculture threatens habitats, triggering tiger-human conflict, resulting in human fatalities and retaliatory killing of tigers.

Sunderban hosts abundant tigers and prey. The world's largest mangrove forest area is threatened by clearing to meet charcoal demand and for prawn fishing. Floating hotels and casinos are proposed, which would further disturb habitat .A 2018 survey reported pressure at Achanakamar, Buxa, Dudhwa, Mukundara, Panna, Rajaji, Sanjay-Dubri, Sariska, and Udanti-Sitanadi due to livestock overgrazing.

=== Protected areas ===
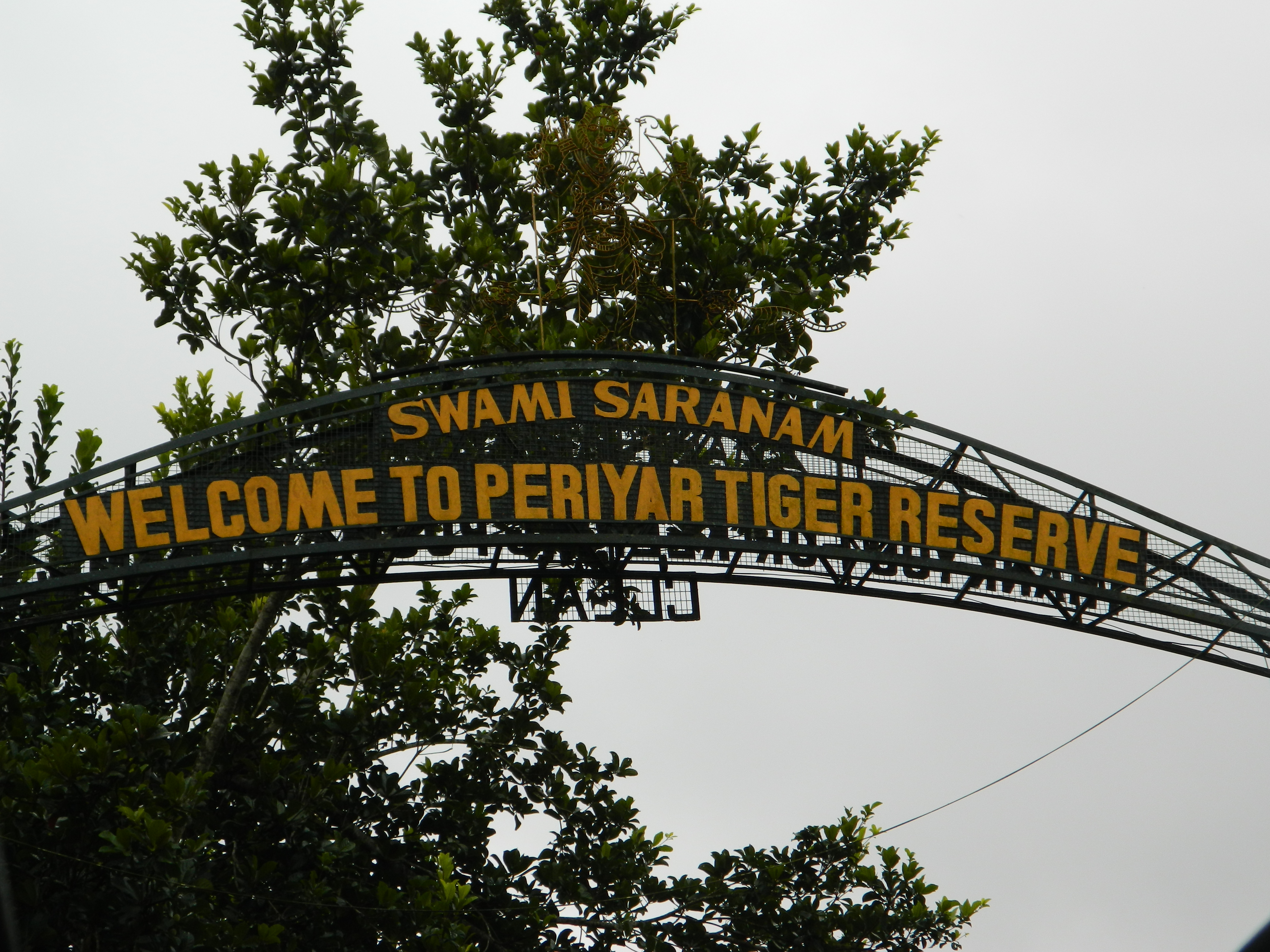
Entrance to the tiger reserve

Protected Areas (PA) were set up to serve as refuge for animals threatened by habitat loss. In 1973, nine reserves were designated protected with cumulative area of approximately 18,278 km^{2}. By 2018, fifty tiger reserves had been designated, encompassing nearly 72,749 km^{2}, about 2.2% of the country. As of July 2022, the number had grown to 52. These reserves play important roles in the success of Project Tiger.

A 2018 survey reported that tiger reserve occupancy had remained stable across the country since 2014 (88,558 km^{2}).

==== Tiger Reserves ====
Reserve sizes vary between 344 km^{2}. to 3,150 km^{2}.

The 2018 assessment reported that Corbett Tiger Reserve carried the largest population, about 231. Bandhavgarh, Bandipur, Nagarhole, Mudumalai and Kaziranga each had over 100 while Dudhwa, Kanha, Tadoba, Sathyamangalam and Sundarbans Tiger Reserves had over 80. Buxa and Dampa Tiger Reserves reported no specimens, although both have historically poor tiger status. Deficiencies were noted at Indravati, Udanti-Sitanadi and Achanakmar owing to poor enforcement. Tiger numbers at Amrabad, Anshi Dandeli, Buxa, Dampa, Kawal, Manas, Nagarjunsagar Sri Sailam, Nameri, Pakke, Palamau, Sanjay-Dubri and Similipal are below their estimated potential.

===== Core, Buffer and Corridor =====
Tiger conservation follows the principle of "core-buffer-corridor". Core area is protected while buffer zones surround the core. The buffer is multiple use with community participation for supporting tiger conservation. Corridors are areas between larger reserves that enable wildlife to move through the landscape. However, many of these corridors are not designated as protected areas and are prone to degradation. NTCA prioritized the protection, conservation and development of corridors. These corridors support genetic exchange through dispersal. They would also mitigate extinction risks. Nature Conservation Foundation under is working on protecting corridors in Cauvery-MM Hills-BR Hills.

Funds from Compensatory Afforestation Fund Management and Planning Authority (CAMPA) promote voluntary village resettlement from core areas.

==== Conservation Assured Tiger Standards (CA|TS) ====
In 2020, the NTCA and the Ministry of Environment, Forest and Climate Change of India have announced Conservation Assured Tiger Standards (CA|TS) covering over 7000 km^{2} which sets minimum standards to manage tiger species, and encourages assessments to benchmark progress. As of July 2021, 14 Tiger Reserves in India - Manas, Kaziranga, Orang, Satpura, Pench, Kanha, Panna, Valmiki, Dudhwa, Parambikulam, Mudumalai, Bandipur, Anamalai and Sundarbans - had been awarded international CA|TS accreditation.

=== M-STrIPES ===
Monitoring System for Tigers: Intensive Protection and Ecological Status (M-STrIPES) is a digital platform that facilitates patrolling, assesses ecological status and aids in mitigating human-wildlife conflict. The M-STrIPES program uses GPS, General Packet Radio Service and remote sensing, to collect information and creates a database. The collected data is used to analyze the information using GIS and statistical tools to allow tiger reserve managers to improve their wildlife protocols.

==== Camera Traps ====
Camera traps are photographic devices equipped with motion sensors which captures the image or video when any animal passes nearby. The Guinness World Records recognized the country's efforts as the world's largest camera trap survey of wildlife in 2018–19. Across 141 different sites and in 26,838 locations, these camera traps were set up to survey an area of 121,337 square kilometers capturing 34,858,623 photographs of wildlife in which 76,651 were tigers. These images were then fed to a stripe-pattern-recognition software which identified 2,461 individual tigers (excluding cubs).

=== TX2 ===
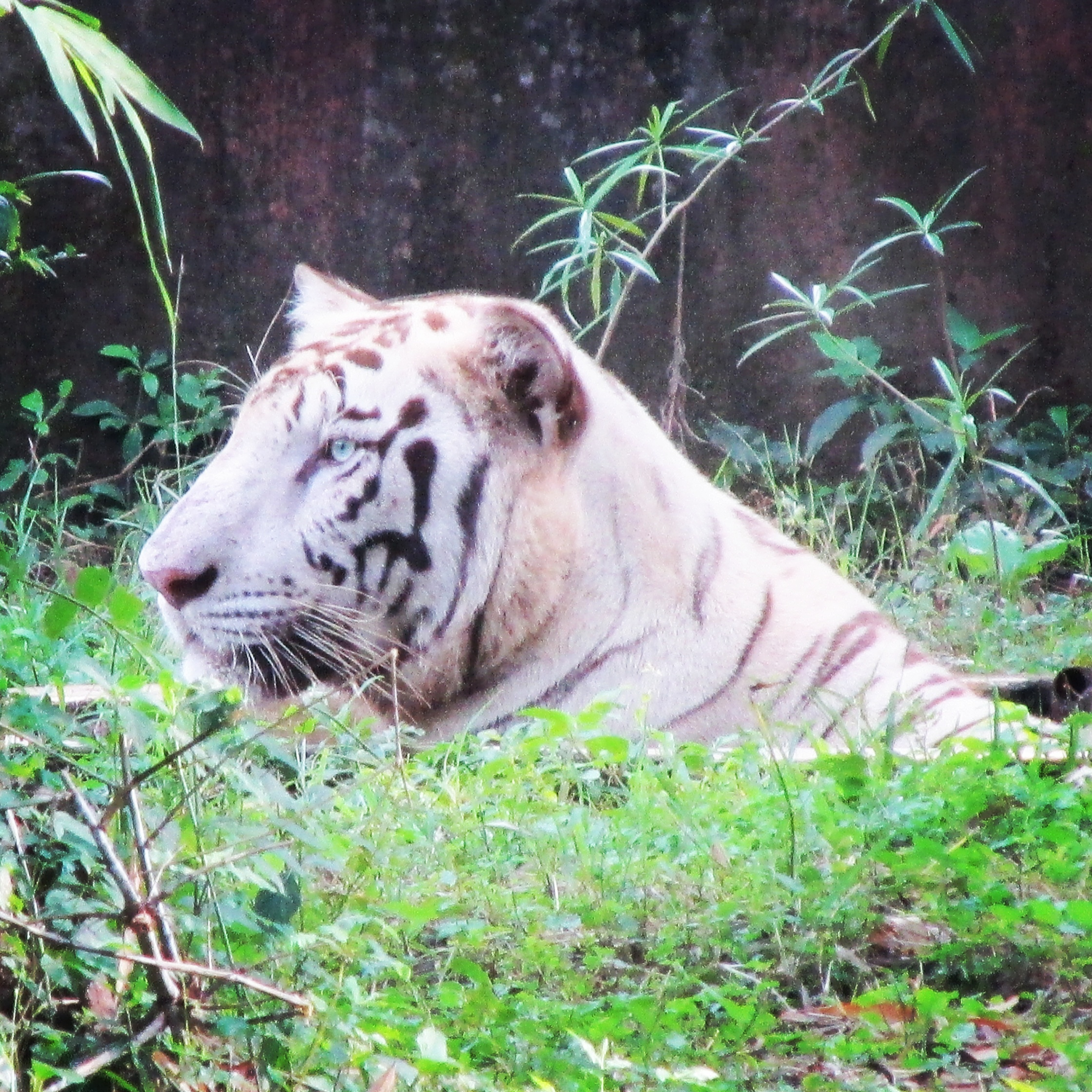
White tiger at Nandankanan Zoological Park

TX2 (Tiger times 2) goal is the global commitment driven by World Wide Fund for Nature and undertaken by 13 range governments at the St Petersburg Tiger Summit (2010) to double the global wild tiger population by 2022. India achieved this goal in 2018, four years ahead of the target. In order to bring the countries together, Global Tiger Day was announced at the summit.

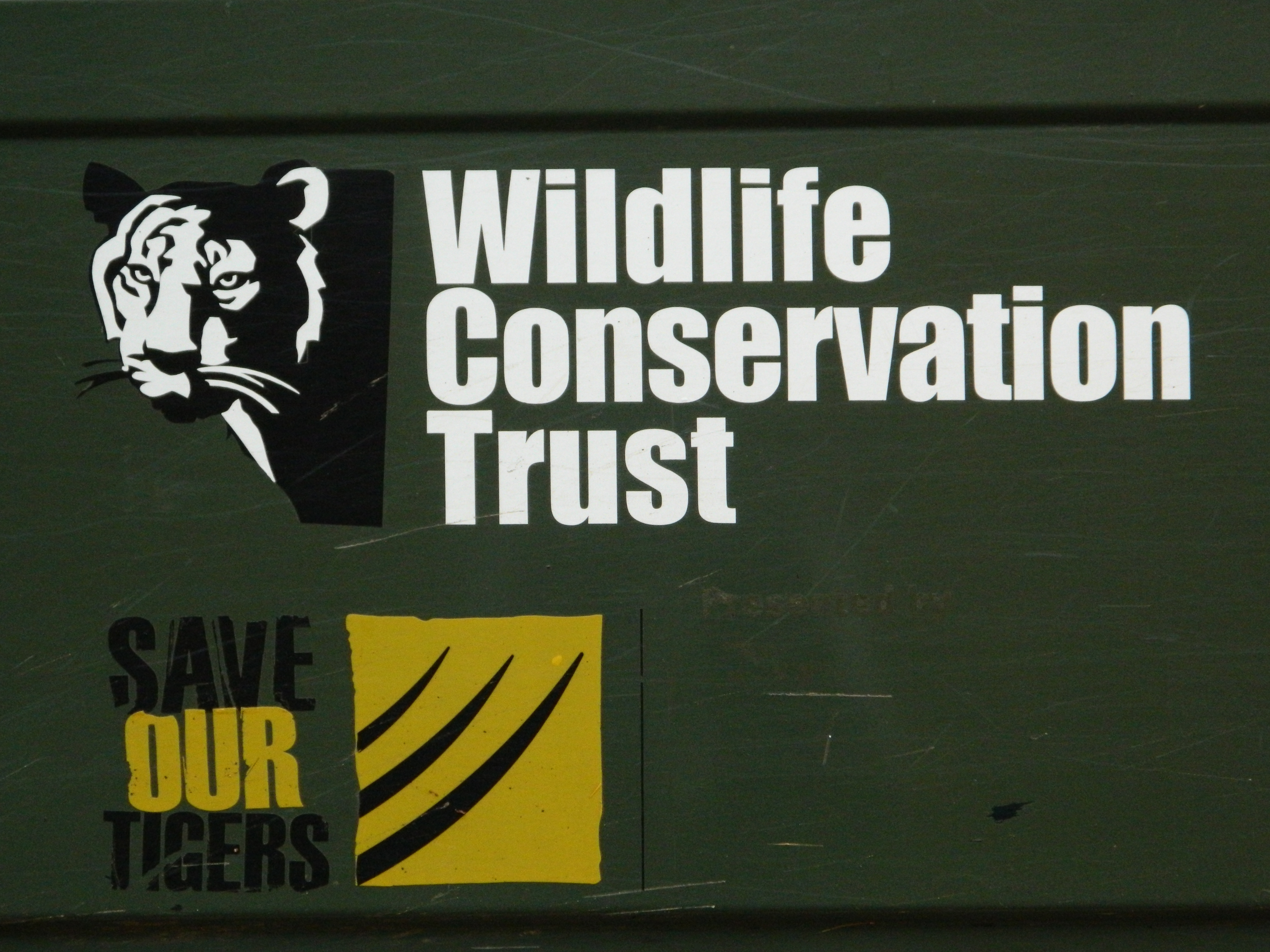
Wildlife Conservation Trust - Save Our Tigers

=== Reducing tiger-human conflict ===
Increases in the tiger population pushes some tigers out of protected areas in an attempt to establish a new territory. The lack of prey in inhabited areas leads these individuals to food in human settlements, leading to conflict. Wildlife Institute of India and others are working to bring down the number of such events. Tiger attacks by state from 2020-24:

- 200-Maharashtra
- 61-Uttar Pradesh
- 32-Madhya Pradesh
- 17-Bihar
- 2-Karnataka

Number of people killed by year in tiger attacks in India:

- 51 in 2020
- 59 in 2021
- 110 in 2022
- 85 in 2023
- 73 in 2024

=== Sustainable livelihood development ===
Maharashtra Forest Department reduced tiger-human conflict with the help of NGOs and grassroots organisations bt providing alternate sources of energy and livelihood for residents, thereby reducing their dependence on forest resources and ensuring maintenance of forest cover.

=== Awareness ===
Civil society organisations and NGOs work with local population to motivate them to support conservation. Local youth join forest staff in patrolling and monitoring.

World Wide Fund for Nature (WWF), Wildlife Protection Society of India (WPSI) and Wildlife Conservation Society (WCS) are some of the organizations working actively in the Indian tiger conservation forefront.

== See also ==
- Project Tiger
