= Dhanauri Wetlands =

Bird watching area in Uttar Pradesh

Coordinates: 28°20′20″N 77°37′08″E

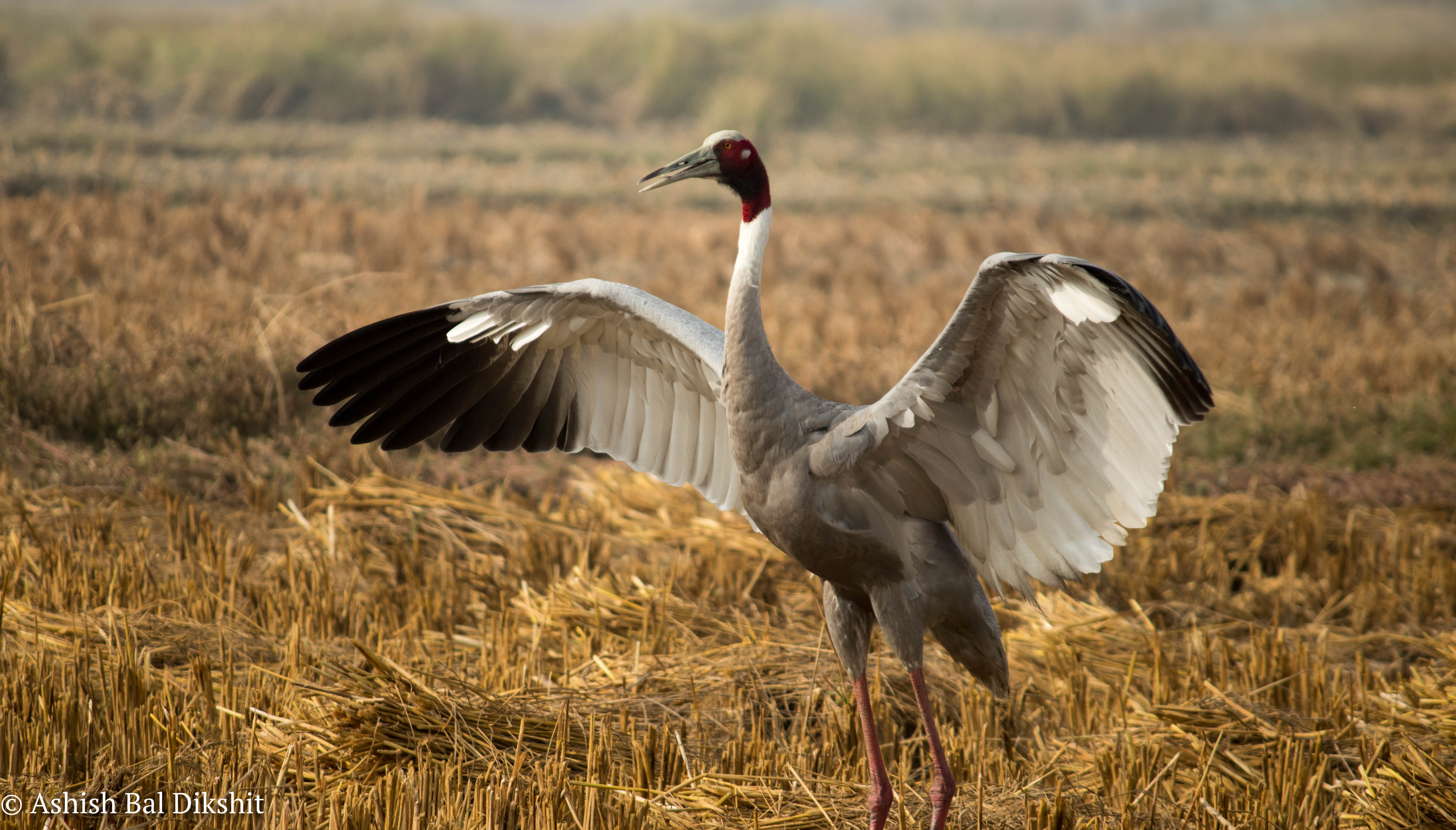
A Sarus crane in November 2016

The Dhanauri Wetlands & birdwatching area is located in Dhanauri village near Dankaur in Uttar Pradesh, India. This 98 hectares under-threat wetland is awaiting the protected status as Ramsar Site.

Dhanauri is about 15 km north of Noida Airport in GB Nagar district.

== Location ==
National Inventory of Wetlands records the Dhanauri wetland over 98 hectares. It has Dhanauri to the northwest, Thasrana to the east and Aminpur Bangar to the southeast.

== Biodiversity ==
The Dhanauri Wetlands is home to over 120 Sarus cranes. The Sarus cranes is the state bird of Uttar Pradesh.

== Threat ==
A condition imposed by the India's Environment Ministry while granting environmental clearance to the Jewar airport, "conservation plan for birds and fauna, in consultation with the Wildlife Institute of India, shall be submitted within six months from the grant of clearance and be implemented in letter and spirit", remains ignored by Uttar Pradesh government as of February 2024. Consequently, National Green Tribunal (NGT) has not received any proposal from the UP government to designatee Dhanauri wetland as a Ramsar site. The site is under threat from encroachment and misallocation of land by the government.

Yamuna Expressway Industrial Development Authority's (YEIDA) 2031 Master Plan records only 55.69 hectares for the Dhanauri Wetland - 16.89 hectares wetland and 38.80 hectares green belt around it. This is 42.31 hectares less out of total 98 hectares recorded in the National Inventory of Wetlands. YEIDA has allotted the land for building houses in this 42.31 hectares, and people have started construction. YEIDA CEO said the equivalent land would be allocated to the wetland on the other side of the wetland where there's no construction.

== See also ==
- List of protected areas of Uttar Pradesh
- List of Ramsar sites in India
- List of tourist attractions in Delhi
