= Undomesticated cat =

Undomesticated cat may refer to:

- Feral cat, an originally domesticated cat that was abandoned or born in the wild
- Big cat, a term used informally to distinguish the larger felid species from smaller ones
- Wildcat (Felis silvestris), a small cat native to most of Africa, Europe, and Southwest and Central Asia into India, western China, and Mongolia
