= Project Tiger =

Tiger conservation programme in India (1973-present)

- Banner logo of Project Tiger

Tiger conservation programme overview
- Formed: 1 April 1973
- Motto: India Leads Tiger Conservation
- Parent department: National Tiger Conservation Authority
- Website: https://ntca.gov.in/

Project Tiger is a wildlife conservation movement initiated in India to protect the endangered tiger. The project was initiated in 1973 by the Department of Environment of the Government of India. As of March 2025, there are 58 protected areas that have been designated as tiger reserves under the project. As of 2022, there were 3,682 wild tigers in India, which is almost 75% of the world's wild tiger population.

== History and objectives ==
The tiger population in India had dwindled to 1,827 individuals by the early 1970s from an estimated 40,000 at the end of the 19th century. Due to the alarming decline of tiger population, the Indian Board of Wildlife, established in 1952, to advise the Government of India on wildlife conservation, formed a task force to save the tigers. Based on the recommendation of the task force, Project Tiger was launched on 1 April 1973 by the Department of Environment of the Government of India. The project was initiated to protect the tiger and its habitats and to establish dedicated tiger reserves for sustaining tiger populations. As per the section 38 of the Wild Life (Protection) Act, 1972, the state governments are responsible for preparing a Tiger Conservation Plan which includes planning and management of notified areas and maintaining the requisite competent staff to ensure the protection of the tiger reserve and providing inputs for maintaining a viable population of tigers, co-predators and prey animals.

Tiger reserves consist of a core area which includes part(s) of protected areas such as a national park or a wildlife sanctuary and a buffer zone which is a mix of forested and non-forested land. Project tiger is aimed at performing the necessary activities to ensure viability of tiger population in the core area and to promote a balance between the existence of people and animals in the buffer zones. In 2006, National Tiger Conservation Authority was formed to administer the tiger reserves which were set up as a part of Project Tiger with Project Tiger becoming a centrally sponsored scheme (CSS) to provide funding for the establishment and administration of the tiger reserves.

In 1973, nine protected areas were initially designated as tiger reserves. By the late 1980s, the initial nine reserves covering an area of 9,115 km^{2} (3,519 sq mi) had been increased to 15 reserves covering an area of 24,700 km^{2} (9,500 sq mi). By 1997, 23 tiger reserves encompassed an area of 33,000 km^{2} (13,000 sq mi). As of December 2024, there are 57 protected areas that have been designated as tiger reserves.

== Tiger population ==
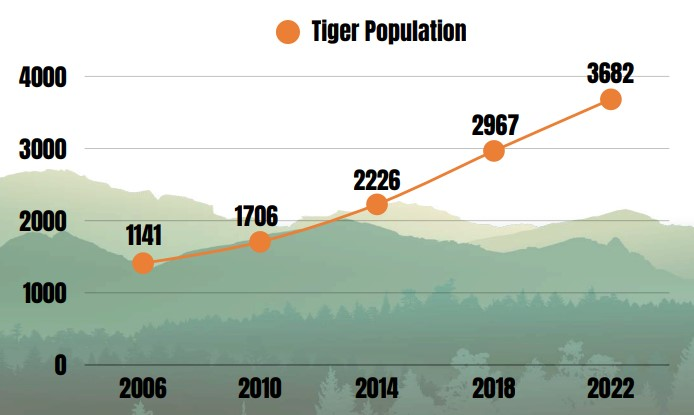
Tiger population in India (2006–2022)

During the tiger census of 2006, a new methodology was used extrapolating site-specific densities of tigers, their co-predators and prey derived from camera trap and sign surveys using GIS. Based on the result of these surveys, the total tiger population was estimated at 1,141 individuals ranging from 1,165 to 1,657 adult and sub-adult tigers of more than 1.5 years of age. The 2010 National Tiger Assessment estimated the total population of wild tigers in India at 1,706. As per the Ministry of Environment and Forests, the wild tiger population in India stood at 2,226 in 2014 with an increase of 30.5% since the 2010 estimate.

In 2018, according to the National Tiger Conservation Authority, there were an estimated 2,603–3,346 wild tigers with an average of 2,967 in existence in India. The wild tiger population increased to 3,682 as of 2022. As India is home to majority of the global wild tiger population, the increase in population of tigers in India played a major role in driving up global populations as well; the number of wild tigers globally rose from 3,159 in 2010 to 3,890 in 2016 according to the World Wide Fund and Global Tiger Forum.

== Management and administration ==
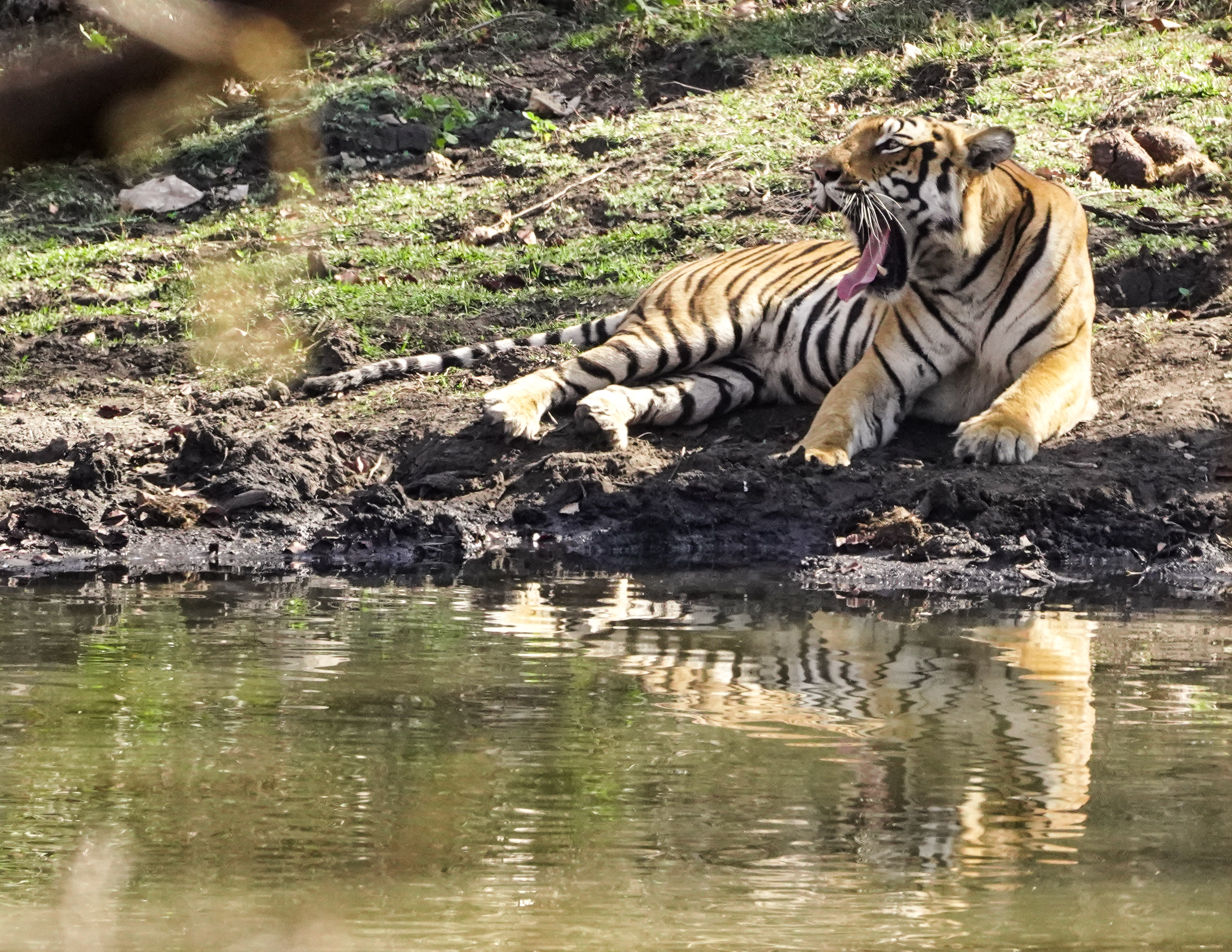
A Bengal tiger in Mudumalai tiger reserve

Project Tiger is headed by an additional director general (ADG) based at New Delhi with regional offices at Bangalore, Guwahati and Nagpur. The wildlife habitats that fall under Project Tiger are categorized into different conservation units: Shivalik-Terai, North East, Sunderbans, Western Ghats, Eastern Ghats, Central India and Sariska.

Function under the ambit of Project Tiger include protection of tiger habitats, daily monitoring, facilitating ecological development for local people in the buffer zones, voluntary relocation of people from core/critical tiger habitats and addressing human-wildlife conflicts. As a part of the project, state are provided assistance on curtailing poaching activities such as disseminating information on poachers, assisting in combing forest floor to check for traps and other anti-poaching activities, maintaining tiger database, providing grants and training for deployment of Special Tiger Protection Force.

Wireless communication systems, infrared thermal cameras and monitoring systems have been developed within the tiger reserves to assist in patrol activities.

== Challenges ==
Project Tiger's efforts are hampered by poaching, deforestation, construction and irregularities in administration of certain reserves. The Forest Rights Act enacted by the Indian government in 2006 recognizes the rights of forest dwelling communities in the buffer zones. Some of the wildlife experts have questioned the implications of the same on tiger conservation as it will increase human-animal conflict and might give opportunities for poaching. While others argue that this overlooks the reality of human-tiger coexistence and the abuse of power by authorities wherein local people who have been co-existing with the animals are being evicted from their traditional lands rather than allowing them a proper role in decision-making to aid the tiger crisis.

== See also ==
- African cheetah translocation to India – Introduction of African cheetahs in India
- International Big Cat Alliance – Indian organisation for big cat conservation (established 2023)
- Project Dolphin – Dolphin conservation programme in India (2021-present)
- Project Elephant – Indian government elephant conservation programme
- Save China's Tigers – International conservation organization
