= Tiger reserves of India =

Conservation and protection areas for Bengal tiger (Panthera tigris tigris) in India

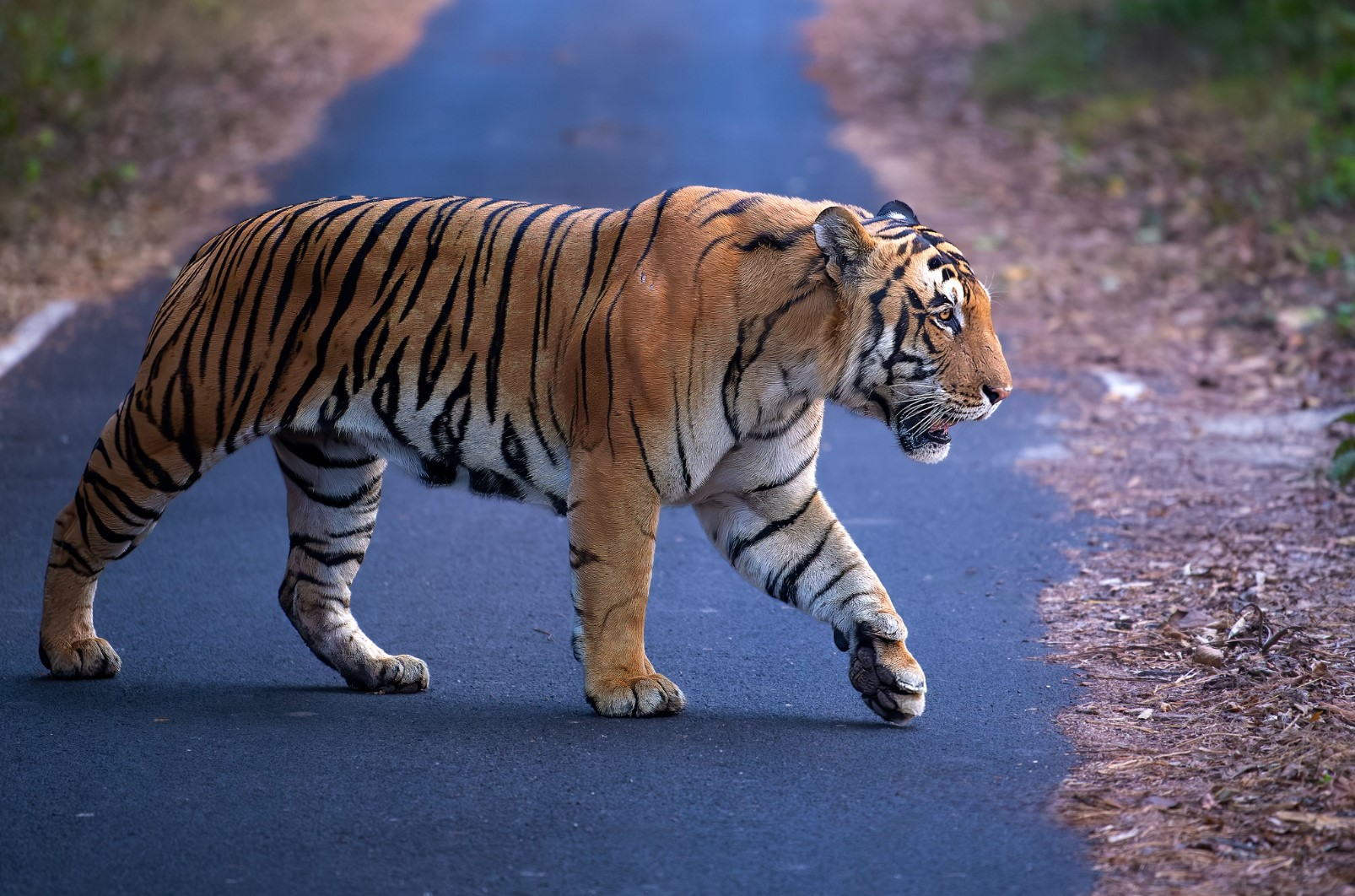
- A Bengal tiger at Pilibhit Tiger Reserve
- Location: India
- Area: 84,500 km^{2} (32,600 sq mi)
- Established: 1973
- Administrator: National Tiger Conservation Authority

India is home to about 70% of the global wild tiger population. The Government of India launched Project Tiger in 1973, as a part of tiger conservation efforts. The initiative led to the establishment of dedicated tiger reserves — protected areas specifically designated for the conservation of tigers and its habitats, with the objective of ensuring a viable natural population of tigers. The National Tiger Conservation Authority was established in 2005 for the management of these tiger reserves. Each tiger reserve consists of a proteced core zone, free from human activity, and a buffer zone, where sustainable activities and regulated tourism are allowed.

As of 2025, there are 58 tiger reserves, covering 84,500 km^{2} (32,600 sq mi). The wild tiger population, which was recorded at 1,411 individuals in 2006, had grown to 3,682 in 2022. Madhya Pradesh and Maharashtra have the most number of tiger reserves with six each. Nagarjunasagar Srisailam in Andhra Pradesh, covering 3,296.31 km^{2} (1,272.71 sq mi), is the largest by area while the smallest is Orang in Assam, with an area of 492 km^{2} (190 sq mi). Jim Corbett holds the largest population of tigers (231), while no tigers were recorded in the Dampa, Buxa, and Palamau tiger reserves.

== Project Tiger ==
Project Tiger was initiated in 1973 as per the Wild Life (Protection) Act, 1972 by the Ministry of Environment, Forest and Climate Change of the Government of India. Under the project, dedicated protected areas called tiger reserves, were initiated to protect the Bengal tiger and its habitats. These reserves were established with an aim to ensure a viable, healthy population of wild tigers in India, free-ranging in their natural habitat. In 2006, the National Tiger Conservation Authority was established to administer the tiger reserves.

Amongst the core objectives of the tiger reserves is to protect the tiger population from threats such as poaching, habitat loss, and human-wildlife conflict. These reserves also aim to maintain the ecological integrity of tiger habitats, and to promote education, and awareness about tiger conservation. The tiger reserves also serve as key sites for monitoring tiger populations, studying their behavior, and research such as the impact of climate change and human encroachment on wildlife. These reserves also aim to maintain a genetic diversity by establishing wildlife corridors that allow tigers to migrate and interbreed across landscapes.

The tiger reserves consist of a strictly protected core area where human activity is prohibited, and a buffer zone which is a mix of forested and non-forested land. Eco-development and community participation are encouraged in the buffer zones. While the union government provides funding, the state governments are responsible for preparing a Tiger Conservation Plan which includes planning and management of notified areas and maintaining the requisite competent staff to ensure the protection of the tiger reserve and providing inputs for maintaining a viable population of tigers, co-predators and prey animals.

== Tiger population ==
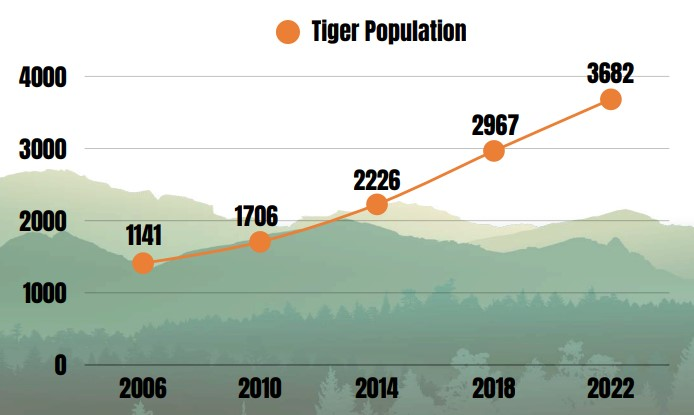
Growth in Tiger population

In 2006, it was estimated that there were 1,411 tigers living in the wild, the lowest ever recorded. The 2010 national tiger assessment estimated the total population of wild tigers in India at 1,706. The wild tiger population in India was 2,226 in 2014, an increase of 30.5% from the 2010 estimate.

In 2018, according to the National Tiger Conservation Authority, there were an estimated 2,967 wild tigers in existence in India. As per the 2022 census, there were 3,682 wild tigers in India, which is about 70% of the global wild tiger population. Amongst the tiger reserves, Jim Corbett had the maximum tiger population (231) and the highest density of tigers (14).

== Tiger reserves ==
In 1973, nine protected areas were initially designated as tiger reserves. By the late 1980s, the initial nine reserves covering an area of 9,115 km^{2} (3,519 sq mi) had been increased to 15 reserves covering an area of 24,700 km^{2} (9,500 sq mi). More than 1,100 tigers were estimated to inhabit the reserves by 1984. By 1997, there were 23 tiger reserves, encompassing an area of 33,000 km^{2} (13,000 sq mi). As of March 2025, there are 58 protected areas that have been designated as tiger reserves.

=== List ===
Tiger reserves in India (Source: National Tiger Conservation Authority)

List of tiger reserves
Name	Inclusion	Last notified	State	Location	Tiger population (2022)	Area (in km^{2})		
Name	Inclusion	Last notified	State	Location	Tiger population (2022)	Core	Buffer	Total
Bandipur	1973–74	2007	Karnataka	11°39′42″N 76°37′38″E	150	872.24	584.06	1,456.3
Corbett (Note: Amangarh Tiger Reserve in Uttar Pradesh is a buffer zone of Jim Corbett National Park and may not be regarded as a separate tiger reserve. It has a buffer zone of 80.6 km^{2} (31.1 sq mi) but no core area of critical tiger habitat.)	1973–74	2010	Uttarakhand	29°32′55″N 78°56′7″E	260	821.99	466.32	1,288.31
Kanha	1973–74	2007	Madhya Pradesh	22°13′39″N 80°38′42″E	105	917.43	1,134.36	2,051.79
Manas	1973–74	2008	Assam	26°43′0″N 90°56′0″E	58	526.22	2,310.88	2,837.10
Melghat	1973–74	2007	Maharashtra	21°26′45″N 77°11′50″E	57	1,500.49	1,268.03	2,768.52
Palamau	1973–74	2012	Jharkhand	23°41′20″N 84°14′56″E	1	414.08	715.85	1,129.93
Ranthambore	1973–74	2007	Rajasthan	26°01′02″N 76°30′09″E	57	1,113.36	297.92	1,411.29
Similipal	1973–74	2007	Odisha	21°50′0″N 86°20′0″E	16	1,194.75	1,555.25	2,750
Sunderbans	1973–74	2007	West Bengal	21°50′17″N 88°53′07″E	100	1,699.62	885.27	2,584.89
Periyar	1978–79	2007	Kerala	9°34′39″N 77°10′48″E	30	881.00	44.00	925.00
Sariska	1978–79	2007	Rajasthan	27°19′3″N 76°26′13″E	19	881.11	332.23	1,213.34
Buxa	1982–83	2009	West Bengal	26°39′0″N 89°34′48″E	1	390.58	367.32	757.90
Indravati	1982–83	2009	Chhattisgarh	19°12′18″N 81°1′53″E	1	1,258.37	1,540.70	2,799.07
Namdapha	1982–83	1987	Arunachal Pradesh	27°29′0″N 96°23′0″E	1	1,807.82	245.00	2,052.82
Nagarjunsagar-Srisailam	1982–83	2007	Andhra Pradesh	16°18′0″N 78°59′0″E	58	2,595.72	700.59	3,296.31
Dudhwa	1987–88	2010	Uttar Pradesh	28°30.5′0″N 80°40.8′0″E	135	1,093.79	1,107.98	2,201.77
Kalakad-Mundanthurai	1988–89	2007	Tamil Nadu	8°41′0″N 77°19′0″E	5	895.00	706.54	1,601.54
Valmiki	1989–90	2012	Bihar	27°19′54″N 84°9′45″E	54	598.45	300.93	899.38
Pench (M.P.)	1992–93	2007	Madhya Pradesh	21°41′35″N 79°14′54″E	77	411.33	768.30	1,179.63
Tadoba-Andhari	1993–94	2007	Maharashtra	20°16′0″N 79°24′0″E	97	625.82	1,101.77	1,727.59
Bandhavgarh	1993–94	2007	Madhya Pradesh	23°41′58″N 80°57′43″E	135	716.9	820.03	1,536.93
Panna	1994–95	2007	Madhya Pradesh	24°43′49.6″N 80°0′38.8″E	55	576.13	1,021.97	1,598.10
Dampa	1994–95	2007	Mizoram	23°34′0″N 92°22′0″E	0	500.00	488.00	988.00
Bhadra	1998–99	2007	Karnataka	13°41′43.72″N 75°38′12.53″E	28	492.46	571.83	1,064.29
Pench (MH)	1998–99	2007	Maharashtra	21°41′35″N 79°14′54″E	48	257.26	483.96	741.22
Pakke	1999–00	2012	Arunachal Pradesh	27°05′0″N 92°51.5′0″E	6	683.45	515.00	1,198.45
Nameri	1999–00	2000	Assam	27°0′36″N 92°47′24″E	3	320.00	144.00	464.00
Satpura	1999–00	2007	Madhya Pradesh	22°29′42″N 78°13′52″E	50	1,339.26	794.04	2,133.31
Anamalai	2008–09	2007	Tamil Nadu	10.4170°0′00″N 77.0567°0′00″E	16	958.59	521.28	1,479.87
Udanti–Sitanadi	2008–09	2009	Chhattisgarh	20.1857°0′00″N 81.9362°0′00″E	1	851.09	991.45	1,842.54
Satkosia	2008–09	2007	Odisha	20°32′24″N 84°49′54″E	0	523.61	440.26	963.87
Kaziranga	2008–09	2007	Assam	26°40′0″N 93°21′0″E	104	625.58	548.00	1,173.58
Achanakmar	2008–09	2009	Chhattisgarh	22°26′11.6″N 81°50′18.5″E	5	626.19	287.82	914.02
Kali	2008–09	2007	Karnataka	14°57′23.04″N 74°15′7.56″E	17	814.88	282.63	1,097.51
Sanjay Dhubri	2008–09	2011	Madhya Pradesh	23°53′7″N 82°3′19″E	16	812.57	861.93	1,674.5
Mudumalai	2008–09	2007	Tamil Nadu	11°36′0″N 76°30′0″E	114	321.00	367.59	688.59
Nagarhole	2008–09	2007	Karnataka	12°3′36″N 76°9′4″E	141	643.35	562.41	1,205.76
Parambikulam	2008–09	2009	Kerala	10°23′0″N 76°42′30″E	31	390.89	252.77	643.66
Sahyadri	2009–10	2012	Maharashtra	17°29′10″N 73°48′32″E	0	612.00	565.45	1,165.57
Biligiri Ranganatha Temple	2010–11	2007	Karnataka	11°59′38″N 77°8′26″E	37	359.10	215.72	574.82
Kawal	2012–13	2012	Telangana	18°59′38″N 79°15′0″E	0	892.23	1,123.21	2,015.44
Sathyamangalam	2013–14	2013	Tamil Nadu	11°38′24″N 77°13′34″E	85	793.49	614.91	1,408.40
Mukandra Hills	2013–14	2013	Rajasthan	24°52′05″N 75°51′22″E	1	417.17	342.82	759.99
Nawegaon–Nagzira	2013–14	2015	Maharashtra	20°56′0″N 80°10′0″E	11	653.67	1,241.27	1,894.94
Amrabad	2014	2015	Telangana	16.38°0′00″N 78.83°0′00″E	12	2,166.37	445.02	2,611.39
Pilibhit	2014	2014	Uttar Pradesh	28°43′7.7196″N 80°4′19.0848″E	63	602.79	127.45	730.25
Bor	2014	2012	Maharashtra	20°58′39″N 78°40′33″E	9	138.12	678.15	816.27
Rajaji	2015	2015	Uttarakhand	30°03′29″N 78°10′22″E	54	819.54	255.63	1,075.17
Orang	2016	2016	Assam	26°33′25″N 92°19′40″E	16	79.28	413.18	492.46
Kamlang	2016	2017	Arunachal Pradesh	27°40′0″N 96°26′0″E	0	671.00	112.00	783.00
Srivilliputhur–Megamalai	2021	2021	Tamil Nadu	09°23′38″N 77°21′51″E	12	641.86	374.7	1,016.57
Ramgarh Vishdhari	2022	2022	Rajasthan	25°59′0″N 75°19′0″E	1	481.91	1,019.99	1,501.90
Ranipur	2022	2022	Uttar Pradesh	24.96°0′00″N 81.064°0′00″E	0	230.31	299.05	529.36
Veerangana Durgavati	2023	2023	Madhya Pradesh	23.54°0′00″N 79.72°0′00″E	0	1,414.00	925.12	2,339.12
Dholpur-Karauli	2023	2023	Rajasthan	26.5°0′00″N 77.02°0′00″E	0	599.64	0.00	599.64
Guru Ghasidas–Tamor Pingla	2024	2024	Chhattisgarh	23°36′07″N 82°28′19″E	0	2,049.23	780.15	2,829.38
Ratapani	2024	2024	Madhya Pradesh	22°55′3.1″N 77°43′20″E	0	763.81	507.65	1,271.47
Madhav	2024	2024	Madhya Pradesh	25°30′00″N 77°49′00″E	5	355.00	1,276.00	1,751.00

== See also ==
- Project Tiger
- National Tiger Conservation Authority
- Wildlife Institute of India
