= Tiger poaching in India =

Tiger poaching in India is a serious threat to tigers in India. From 100,000 tigers at the turn of the 20th century, only 3,000 wild tigers survive today. This decline was largely due to the slaughter of tigers by colonials and Indian elites during the British Raj, which continued following India's independence. Most of the 1,700 remaining specimens are India's Bengal tigers.

== Causes ==
In India, poachers hunt tigers due to their high demand in the illegal wildlife market. The tiger's body parts remain significantly valuable as their skin, bones, claws, teeth, and organs are all used for several purposes. In the black market, tigers are in high demand, with the prices increasing exponentially. The bones are smuggled almost exclusively to China, where they are used in tiger bone wine—a pricey traditional Chinese medicine (TCM) tonic thought to impart the tiger’s great strength and vigor. Almost every part of the tiger is valued in TCM. Most of the skins end up in China, used for high-end luxury décor. A single skin can sell for 6.5 million INR. Tiger bones are used for traditional medicine purposes, teeth and claws for jewellery, and whiskers are used in ritual and religious practices. Poachers move to India due to its widespread population of different types of tigers, especially the Bengal tiger.

== Trends ==
In recent years, the trend of tiger poaching in India has been on the rise. India is home to the majority of the world's wild tiger population—around 65% of all tigers in the world. With accelerating tiger poaching in India, we see a significant decline in the population of the native tiger species. The conviction rate for poachers is approximately four per cent. In the last two decades, the global wild tiger population has been halved (Morgan et al., 2021). They are highly vulnerable to poaching because of the increased demand for their body parts. (Nowell, 2010; Stoner et al., 2016). Various enforcement agencies seized 2,359 tiger parts globally between 2000 and 2018 (Morgan et al., 2021; Wong & Krishnaswamy, 2019). A global wildlife trade monitoring network's report has voiced concern over India's tiger poaching data management mechanism and said there was 'disparity' between occurrences of 'seizure of tigers and tiger parts' in the country and the recording of such incidents on official records. However, recently, there has been an effort to contain this trend, noting that India is the only tiger range country to have prioritized the management of data on tiger poaching and seizure. the report titled "Reduced To Skin And Bones Re-Examined: Full Analysis" has lamented that there has been a significant decline in the number of seizures of tigers and tiger parts being reported in India. However, we can see a rise in tiger deaths in many Indian states, such as Madhya Pradesh's tiger stronghold, which is under siege. Poachers now exploit farm edges, corridors, and live wires. With 36 tiger deaths in 2025 and evidence of organized networks, experts warn the state must act fast to secure its buffers, or risk losing its crown.

== Sansar Chand ==
One of the most infamous tiger poachers in India was Sansar Chand. He was a notable wildlife trafficker/poacher and was based mainly in northern India, near Delhi. He was involved in a massive illegal wildlife trade network. Sansar was mostly known for the killing and trading of tiger bones and skins, trafficking tigers to countries throughout Asia, and the sale of tiger parts in the international black market. Diaries seized from Sansar Chand's family by the Rajasthan Police in 2004 allegedly showed the transaction of 40 tiger skins and 400 leopard skins in a period of just 11 months from October 2003 to September 2004. During an Interrogation by the CBI in 2006, Sansar Chand admitted to selling 470 tiger skins and 2,130 leopard skins to just 4 clients from Nepal and Tibet. He was arrested multiple times. He was later convicted and received a prison sentence for his crime. He died from cancer in 2014.

He was named "Veerappan of the North." and called "the kingpin running the country’s biggest wildlife trade syndicate." He stayed in the trade without arrest for 40 years. He ran his business from Delhi's Sadar Bazar.

He is blamed for wiping out the entire Sariska Tiger Reserve tiger population in 2005.

In 1991, a group arrested in Sawai Madhopur in Rajasthan confessed that they had poached 15 to 18 tigers over two years for him. In January 2005, a raid at Chand's godown in Patel Nagar revealed two tiger skins, 28 leopard skins, 14 tiger canines, three kg of tiger claws, 10 tiger jaws and 60kg of leopard and tiger paws. In 1988, police had seized 25,800 snake skins from him. Chand's wife, Rani and their son, Akash, were also arrested for wildlife trafficking. Chand was arrested in the Patel Nagar area of New Delhi. Delhi police arrested him after learning that he regularly bought Rajasthan Patrika, a newspaper.

== History ==
Tiger poaching in India started during the British Raj (1858-1947). Elites usually were the ones who would hunt tigers. Tiger hunting became popular in the early 20th century. However, in the 1970s, the Indian government realized that the tiger population had significantly decreased. The Indian government passed many laws to revive the tiger population, such as Project Tiger and the Wildlife Protection Act in 1972. The Wildlife Protection Act helped save the native tiger population. In 1972, the Wild Life Protection Act was passed, and nine tiger habitats were established. Demand for tiger parts declined, and interest in tiger protection increased. Tiger populations improved gradually from 1972 to 1987. Incidents of tiger crime were rare during this time, prompting the authors to call this era “the golden years for wild tigers in India.” However, the wildlife crime rates increased in the late 1980s and 1990s due to demand for tiger bones in China. Following a major seizure of 298 kg of tiger bones in August 1993, enforcement efforts increased. The authors’ analysis reflected a high likelihood of wildlife crime detection between 1993 and 1997. Despite that, no further efforts were taken to reduce wildlife crime. Hence, from 1997-2004, there was a sudden rise in the poaching of tigers with groups like the ones under Sansar Chand taking advantage of the system. In December 1999, three tanned, folded, and signed tiger skins were seized in Ghaziabad, Uttar Pradesh. The number of seizures of tiger body parts was increasing. Demand for tiger skins as a display of wealth in Tibet in the early 2000s led to a massive seizure of 31 tiger skins, along with other animal hides. The seizure occurred in the Sangsang region coming in the Tibet Autonomous Region in 2003. The likelihood of wildlife crime detection in India was lowest between 2001 and 2003. Today, the native tiger population is endangered, and there is still a strict conservation program by the Indian government. India forms the largest tiger conservation unit in the world. Poaching is at its peak, although there are stringent laws and strict enforcement.

== Anti-poaching measures and conservation programs ==
In 1972, the Indian government passed the Wildlife Protection Act, which made the killing or trading of tiger species illegal and created a punishment for any kind of illegal poaching. The handling and trade of tiger parts became illegal in India with the implementation of the Wildlife Protection Act in 1972, followed by the documentation of cases in the 1980s. Southern Indian states recorded the maximum tiger smuggling cases, as they have a viable tiger population. Following the passing of the law, nine tiger habitats were established. This result in the demand for tiger parts declining and interest in tiger protection increasing. Between 2000 and 2008, all the tigers in two of the premier tiger reserves, Sariska and Panna, were lost. In 1973, India launched Project Tiger, which was one of the first tiger conservation programs India instituted. Project Tiger created protected reserves and led to an increase in the tiger population. In the dense forests in the heart of central India, the reserves of Madhya Pradesh play a crucial role in what the government says is the success story of Project Tiger. Launched 50 years ago, the country’s flagship conservation programme has seen tiger numbers rise. In the recent past alone, we see an increase in tiger population from 2,967 in 2018 to 3,176 in 2022. However, that still is a lower growth rate of 6.7% compared to that of ~33% between 2014 and 2018. Project Tiger was initially hailed as a great success until it was discovered that the initial tiger count had been seriously flawed.

== See also ==
- Tiger#Commercial hunting and traditional medicine
- Gir Forest National Park
- Poaching in India
- Project Tiger
- British Raj
