= International Big Cat Alliance =

Indian organisation for big cat conservation (established 2023)

International Big Cat Alliance logo

The International Big Cat Alliance (IBCA) is a global alliance launched by India in April 2023 during the 50th anniversary of Project Tiger. The alliance aims at conservation of the world's seven principal big cats, which include the tiger, lion, snow leopard, leopard, jaguar, puma, and cheetah. The headquarters of the alliance is located in New Delhi.

== Governance ==
A general assembly, will consist of all member countries. A secretariat and a council with a minimum of seven but a maximum of fifteen member nations will be chosen by the general assembly for a five-year term. The IBCA secretary general will be appointed by the general assembly for a defined period on the advice of the council.

Through the alliance, the member countries will exchange experiences, provide faster assistance to their neighbours, and place a strong emphasis on capacity building. Standard operating procedures will be created by the alliance and used by all members as a guide. There will be a list of recommendations that will instruct nations on how to stop illegal wildlife trading and poaching. The idea holds that once illegal wildlife trade is reduced, poaching will eventually come to an end. The IBCA is anticipated to be self-sustaining after the first five years, which will be supported by India's "total grant assistance" of $100 million, through membership fees, contributions from bilateral and multilateral organizations, and the private sector.

== Membership ==
As of November 2026, 31 countries have become IBCA members including Armenia, Bhutan, Cambodia, Eswatini, Ethiopia, Guinea, India, Nepal, Liberia, Nicaragua, Russia, Somalia, Suriname, Angola, Sri Lanka, Bangladesh, El Salvador, Eritia , Ghana, Guatemala, Malawi, Malaysia, Mongolia, Myanmar, Niger, Panama, Paraguay, Rowanda, Saudi Arabia, Venezuela, and South Sudan

=== Partnership organizations ===
IBCA cooperates with various organizations including the International Union for Conservation of Nature, World Wildlife Fund, World Customs Organization, United Nations Development Program, World Tourism Organization, International Snow Leopard Trust, and the Cheetah Conservation Fund.

== Summit ==
The first IBCA Summit, originally scheduled for 1 June 2026 in New Delhi, was postponed following the rescheduling of the Fourth India–Africa Forum Summit, with which it was to be held in conjunction. New dates are to be announced after consultations with member countries.

== See also ==
- Wildlife conservation
