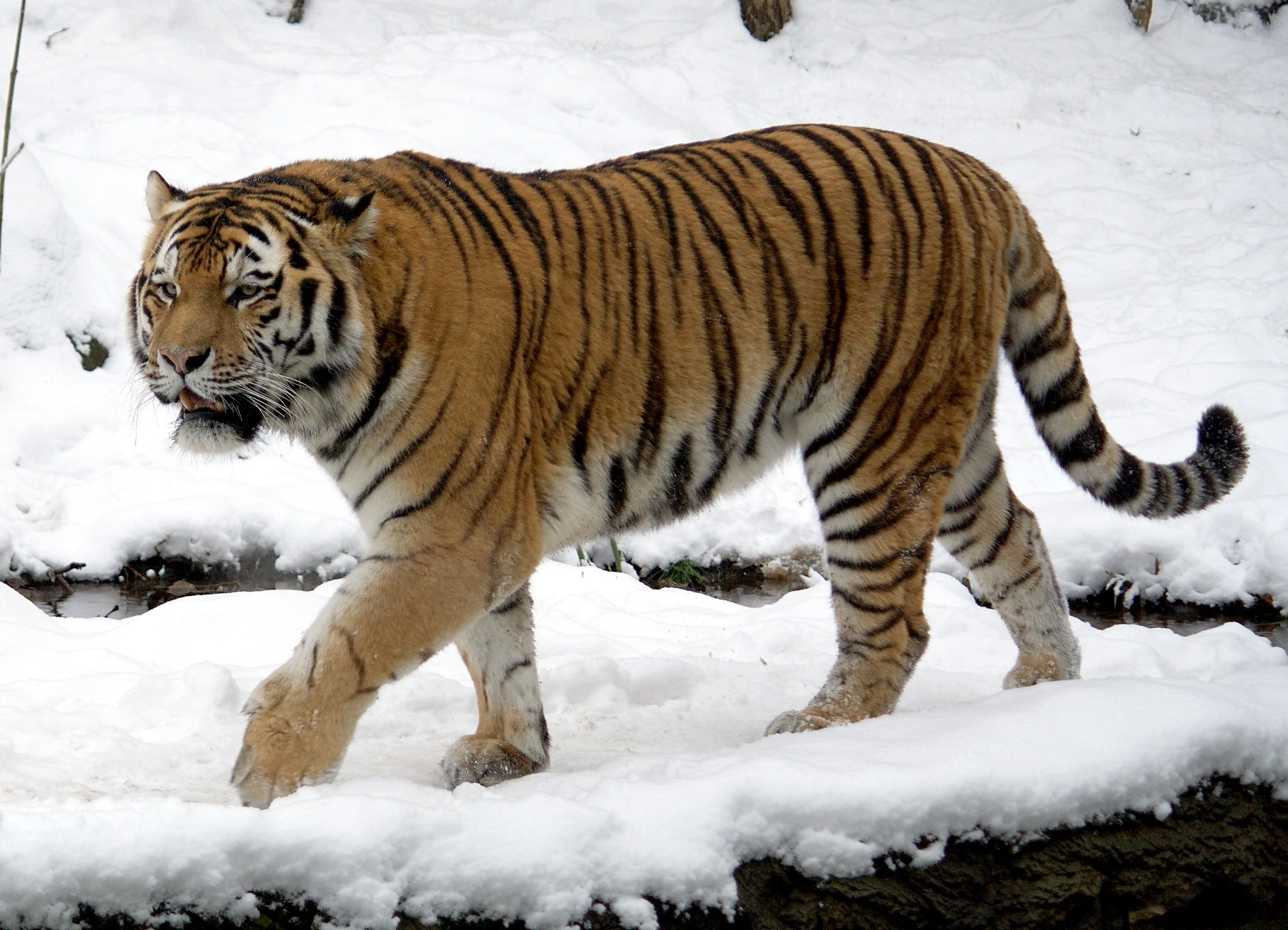
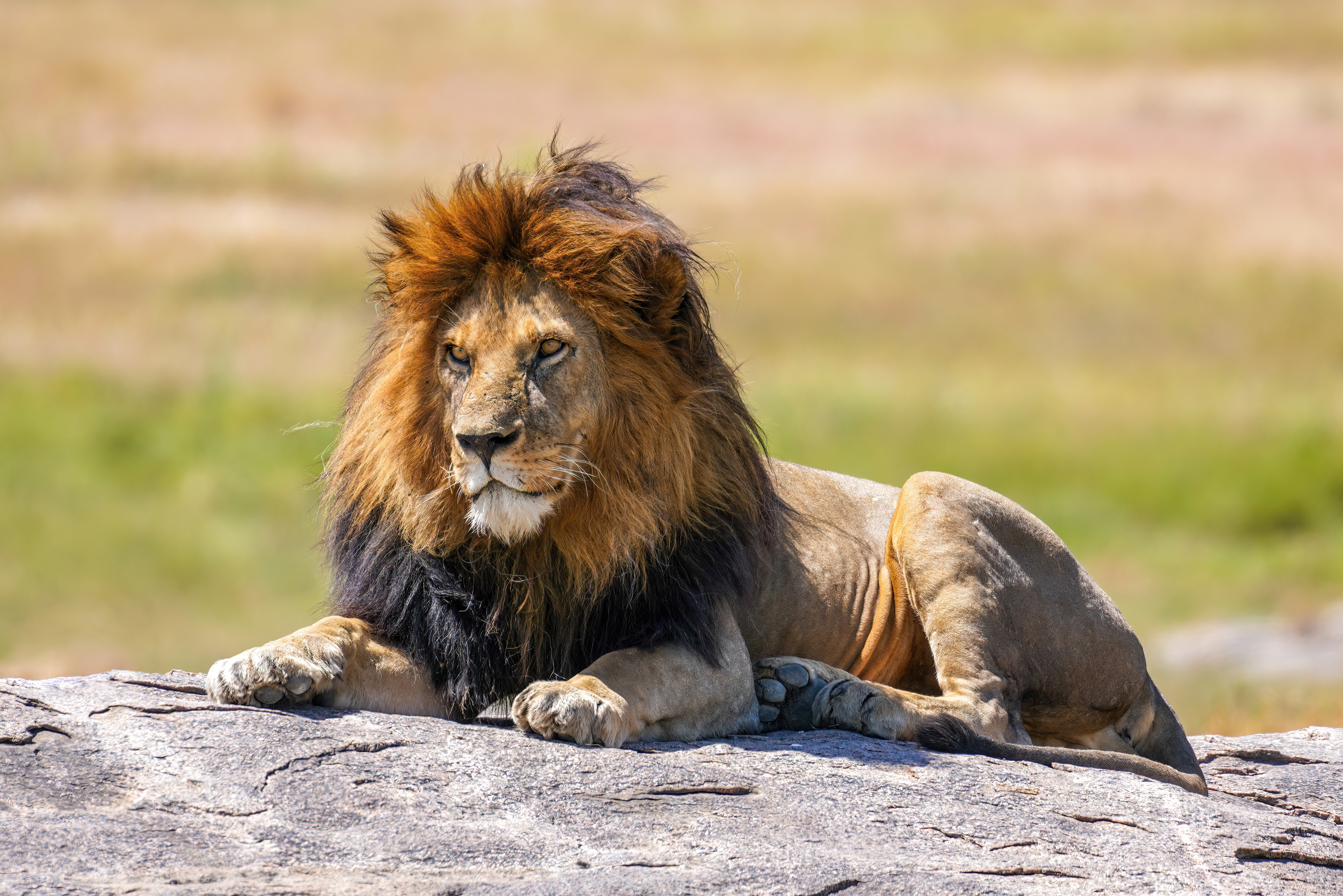
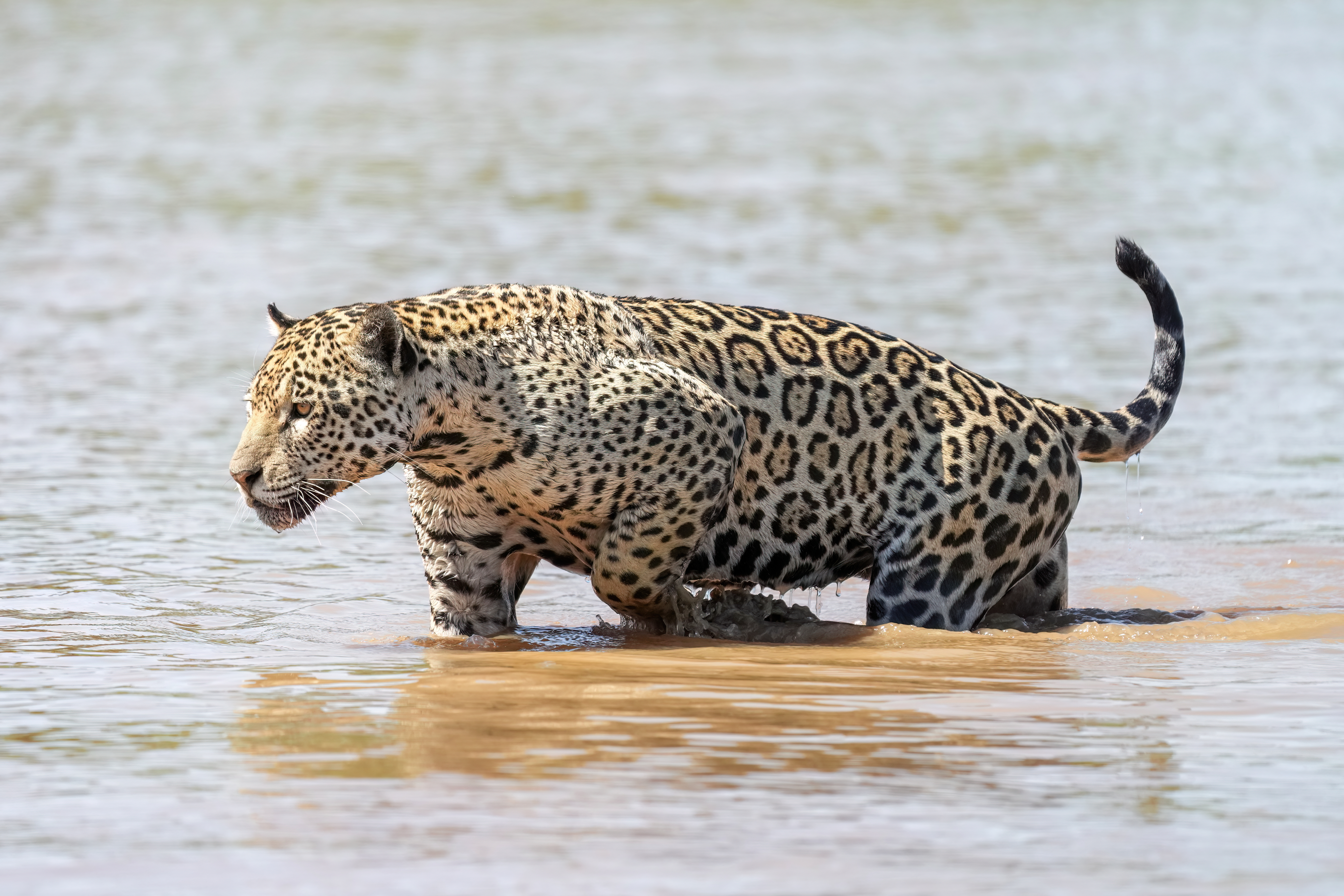
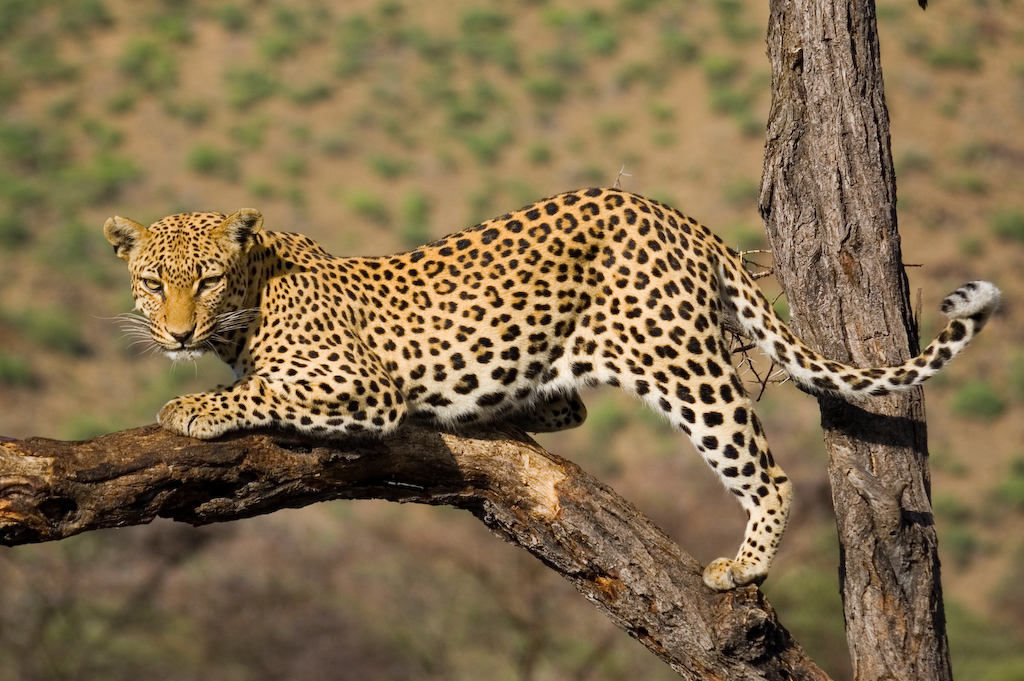
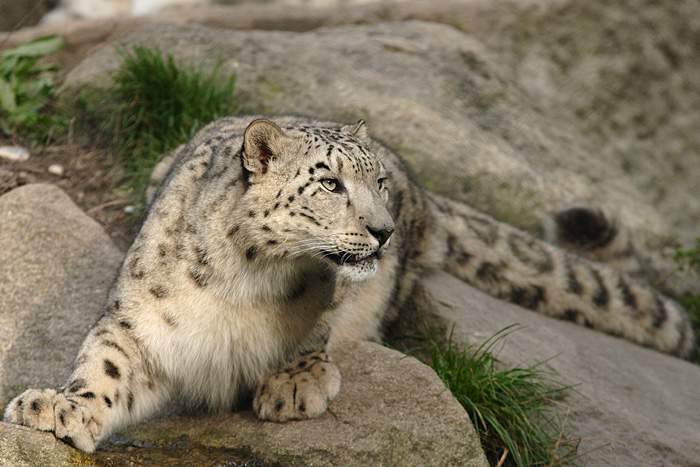
- The genus Panthera, from top to bottom: the tiger, the lion, the jaguar, the leopard, and the snow leopard.

Scientific classification
- Kingdom: Animalia
- Phylum: Chordata
- Class: Mammalia
- Order: Carnivora
- Superfamily: Feloidea
- Family: Felidae

Species
- Cheetah (Acinonyx jubatus); Cougar (Puma concolor); Jaguar (Panthera onca); Leopard (Panthera pardus); Lion (Panthera leo); Snow leopard (Panthera uncia); Tiger (Panthera tigris)

= Big cat =

Big cats

Paraphyletic group of mammals

The term "big cat" is sometimes used to mean any of the five living members of the genus Panthera (the tiger, lion, jaguar, leopard, and snow leopard), or may refer to any member of the cat family that is considered "big", such as cheetahs and cougars.

All cats are members of the Felidae family, sharing similar musculature, cardiovascular systems, skeletal frames, and behaviour. Both the cheetah and cougar differ physically from fellow big cats and, to a greater extent, other small cats. As obligate carnivores, big cats are considered apex predators, topping their food chain without natural predators of their own. Native ranges include the Americas, Africa, and Asia; the ranges of the leopard and tiger also extend into Europe, specifically in Russia.

== Species ==
- Family Felidae
  - Subfamily Pantherinae
    - Genus Panthera
      - Tiger (Panthera tigris)
      - Lion (Panthera leo)
      - Jaguar (Panthera onca)
      - Leopard (Panthera pardus)
      - Snow leopard (Panthera uncia)
  - Subfamily Felinae
    - Genus Acinonyx
      - Cheetah (Acinonyx jubatus)
    - Genus Puma
      - Cougar (Puma concolor)

== Evolution ==
It is estimated that the ancestors of most big cats split away from the Felinae about 6.37 Ma. The Felinae, on the other hand, comprises mostly small to medium-sized cats, including domestic cats, but also some larger cats such as the cougar and cheetah.

A 2010 study published in Molecular Phylogenetics and Evolution has given insight into the exact evolutionary relationships among members of genus Panthera. The study reveals that the snow leopard and the tiger are sister species, while the lion, leopard, and jaguar are more closely related to each other. The tiger and snow leopard diverged from the ancestral big cats approximately 3.9 Ma. The tiger then evolved into a unique species towards the end of the Pliocene epoch, approximately 3.2 Ma. The ancestor of the lion, leopard, and jaguar split from other big cats from 4.3–3.8 Ma. Between 3.6 and 2.5 Ma, the jaguar diverged from the ancestor of lions and leopards. Lions and leopards split from one another approximately 2 Ma. P. blytheae from northern Central Asia was originally described as the oldest known Panthera species; however, subsequent studies have agreed that it is not a member of Panthera and that it belongs to a different genus, Palaeopanthera.

- 3.9 Ma
  - 3.2 Ma
    - Snow leopard
    - Tiger
  - 3.6 Ma
    - Jaguar
    - 2 Ma
      - Lion
      - Leopard

== Description and abilities ==
=== Roaring ===
The ability to roar comes from an elongated and specially adapted larynx and hyoid apparatus. The larynx is attached to the hyoid bone that is hanging from a sequence of bones. This sequence of bones the hyoid hangs from are tympanohyal, stylohyal, epihyal, and ceratohyal; these are located in the mandible and skull. In the larynx, there are vocal folds that produce the structure needed to stretch the ligament to a length that creates the roar effect. This tissue is made of thick collagen and elastic fiber that becomes denser as it approaches the epithelial mucosal lining. When this large pad folds it creates a low natural frequency, causing the cartilage walls of the larynx to vibrate. When it begins to vibrate the sound moves from a high to low air resistance which makes the roaring.

The lion's larynx is the longest, giving it the most robust roar. The roar in good conditions can be heard 8 or even 10 km (5 or 6 mi) away. All five extant members of the genus Panthera contain this elongated hyoid but owing to differences in the larynx the snow leopard cannot roar. Unlike the roaring cats in their family, the snow leopard is distinguished by the lack of a large pad of fibro-elastic tissue that allows for a large vocal fold.

=== Weight range ===
The range of weights exhibited by the species is large. At the bottom, adult snow leopards usually weigh 22 to 55 kg (49 to 121 lb), with an exceptional specimen reaching 75 kg (165 lb).

Male and female lions typically weigh 150–250 kg (330–550 lb) and 110–182 kg (243–401 lb) respectively, and male and female tigers 100–306 kg (220–675 lb) and 75–167 kg (165–368 lb) respectively. Exceptionally heavy male lions and tigers have been recorded to exceed 306 kg (675 lb) in the wilderness, and weigh around 450 kg (990 lb) in captivity.

The liger, a hybrid of a lion and tiger, can grow to be much larger than either parent species. In particular, a liger in captivity called 'Nook' is reported to have weighed over 550 kg (1,210 lb).

== Interaction with humans ==
=== Conservation ===
An animal sanctuary provides a refuge for animals to live out their natural lives in a protected environment. Usually, these animal sanctuaries are the organizations which provide a home to big cats whose private owners are no longer able or willing to care for their big cats. However, the use of the word sanctuary in an organization's name is by itself no guarantee that it is a true animal sanctuary in the sense of a refuge. To be accepted by the United States Fish and Wildlife Service (FWS) as a bona fide animal sanctuary and to be eligible for an exemption from the prohibition of interstate movement of big cats under the Captive Wildlife Safety Act (CWSA), organizations must meet the following criteria:

- Must be a non-profit entity that is tax-exempt under section 501(a) of the Internal Revenue Code
- Cannot engage in commercial trade in big cat species, including their offspring, parts, and products made from them
- Cannot breed big cats
- Cannot allow direct contact between big cats and the public at their facilities
- Must keep records of transactions involving covered cats
- Must allow the service to inspect their facilities, records, and animals at reasonable hours

Internationally, a variety of regulations are placed on big cat possession. In Austria, big cats may only be owned in a qualified zoo which is overseen by a zoologist or veterinarian. Requirements must also be met for enclosures, feeding, and training practices. Both Russia and South Africa regulate private ownership of big cats native to each country. Some countries, including Denmark, Thailand and India, prohibit all private ownership of big cats.

=== Threats ===
The members of the Panthera genus are classified as some level of threatened by the IUCN Red List: the lion, leopard and snow leopard are categorized as Vulnerable; the tiger is listed as Endangered; and the jaguar is listed as Near Threatened. Cheetahs are also classified as Vulnerable, and the cougar is of Least Concern. All species currently have populations that are decreasing. The principal threats to big cats vary by geographic location but primarily consist of habitat destruction and poaching. In Africa, many big cats are hunted by pastoralists or government "problem animal control" officers. Certain protected areas exist that shelter large and exceptionally visible populations of African leopards, lions and cheetahs, such as Botswana's Chobe, Kenya's Masai Mara, and Tanzania's Serengeti; outside these conservation areas, hunting poses the dominant threat to large carnivores.

In the United States, 19 states have banned ownership of big cats and other dangerous exotic animals as pets, and the Captive Wildlife Safety Act bans the interstate sale and transportation of these animals. The initial Captive Wildlife Safety Act (CWSA) was signed into law on December 19, 2003. To address problems associated with the increasing trade in certain big cat species, the CWSA regulations were strengthened by a law passed on September 17, 2007. The big cat species addressed in these regulations are the lion, tiger, leopard, snow leopard, clouded leopard, cheetah, jaguar, cougar, and any hybrid of these species (liger, tigon, etc.). Private ownership is not prohibited, but the law makes it illegal to transport, sell, or purchase such animals in interstate or foreign commerce. Although these regulations seem to provide a strong legal framework for controlling the commerce involving big cats, international organizations such as the World Wildlife Fund (WWF) have encouraged the U.S. to further strengthen these laws. The WWF is concerned that weaknesses in the existing U.S. regulations could be unintentionally helping to fuel the black market for tiger parts.

== See also ==
- Megafauna
- List of largest cats
- Apex predator
- Panthera hybrid
- International Big Cat Alliance
- British big cats
