= National Tiger Conservation Authority =

Indian government agency

- Logo of the NTCA

Wildlife conservation agency overview
- Formed: December 2005
- Parent department: Ministry of Environment, Forest and Climate Change, Government of India
- Child Wildlife conservation agency: Project Tiger
- Website: https://www.tigernet.nic.in/

The National Tiger Conservation Authority (NTCA) is a wildlife conservation agency formed to protect the endangered Bengal tiger in India. It was established by the Government of India under Ministry of Environment, Forest and Climate Change in December 2005 for the management of Project Tiger and the various tiger reserves in India. It has been constituted under section 38 L (1) of Wildlife (Protection) Act, 1972. As of 2023, there were 3,682 wild tigers in India, which is almost 75% of the world's wild tiger population.

== Background ==
In 1973, Project Tiger was initiated by the Ministry of Environment, Forest and Climate Change of the Government of India, which was aimed at protecting the Bengal Tiger and its habitats and establishing dedicated tiger reserves for sustaining tiger populations. The state governments were entrusted with the planning and management of notified areas. In December 2005, the National Tiger Conservation Authority (NTCA) was formed under section 38 of the amended Wild Life (Protection) Act, 1972, to administer the tiger reserves which were set up as a part of Project Tiger with Project Tiger becoming a centrally sponsored scheme (CSS) to provide funding for the establishment and administration of the tiger reserves.

== Objectives and functions ==
The primary objective for the establishment of the NTCA was to create a statutory body to provide legal directives for the implementation of the Project Tiger. The agency is also tasked with facilitation the relationship between the central and state governments, providing updates to the Parliament of India, and addressing concerns of people living in the buffer zones of the Tiger reserves. The NTCA approves the Tiger conservation plans outlined by the state governments.

The NTCA is responsible for providing requisite technological and legal support for the implementation of the Tiger conservation plans and training the forest officers. It is also tasked with monitoring and surveillance of tiger habitats, population estimation of tiger and prey, and promotion of other allied research. Other functions of the NTCA include the evaluation and approval of projects within the tiger reserves, enacting guidelines for tourism, management of concerns of the local population in the adjoining areas of the tiger reserves to effectively manage forest resources and minimise human wildlife conflict. Wireless communication systems, infrared thermal cameras and monitoring systems have been developed by the NTCA to assist in patrol activities.

== Organisation ==
The authority is headed by the Minister of Environment and Forests with the minister of state serving as the deputy. It includes the following members:

- Secretaries from various ministries such as Environment and Forests, Law, Panchayati Raj, Social Justice and Empowerment, and Tribal Affairs.
- Three Member of Parliament including two from the Lok Sabha and one from the Rajya Sabha.
- Eight wildlife conservation experts including two with experience in tribal development.
- Director General of forests, Inspector General of forests and Director of Wildlife preservation.
- Chairpersons of the National Commission for the Scheduled Tribes and Scheduled Castes.
- Six chief wildlife wardens from the states on rotational basis for three year terms.

== Tiger population ==
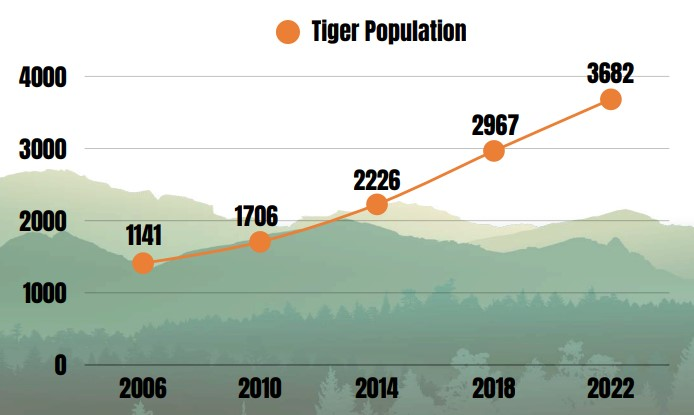
Growth in Tiger population

During the tiger census of 2006, a new methodology was used extrapolating site-specific densities of tigers, their co-predators and prey derived from camera trap and sign surveys using GIS. Based on the result of these surveys, the total tiger population was estimated at 1,411 individuals ranging from 1,165 to 1,657 adult and sub-adult tigers of more than 1.5 years of age. The 2010 National Tiger Assessment estimated the total population of wild tigers in India at 1,706. As per Ministry of Environment and Forests, the wild tiger population in India stood at 2,226 in 2014 with an increase of 30.5% since the 2010 estimate.

In 2018, according to the National Tiger Conservation Authority, there were an estimated 2,603–3,346 wild tigers with an average of 2,967 in existence in India. The wild tiger population increased to 3,682 as of 2022. As India is home to majority of the global wild tiger population, the increase in population of tigers in India played a major role in driving up global populations as well; the number of wild tigers globally rose from 3,159 in 2010 to 3,890 in 2016 according to the World Wide Fund and Global Tiger Forum.

== Tiger reserves ==
In 1973, nine protected areas were initially designated as tiger reserves. By the late 1980s, the initial nine reserves covering an area of 9,115 km^{2} (3,519 sq mi) had been increased to 15 reserves covering an area of 24,700 km^{2} (9,500 sq mi). By 1997, 23 tiger reserves encompassed an area of 33,000 km^{2} (13,000 sq mi). As of March 2025, there are 58 protected areas that have been designated as tiger reserves.
