= Mahavir Swami Wildlife Sanctuary =

Wildlife sanctuary in Uttar Pradesh, India

Coordinates: 24.52°N 78.25°E

- IUCN category IV (habitat/species management area)
- Interactive map of Mahavir Swami Wildlife Sanctuary
- Location: Lalitpur district, Uttar Pradesh, India
- Area: 5.41 km^{2} (2.09 sq mi)
- Established: 1977

Mahavir Swami Sanctuary, is one of many wildlife sanctuaries in Uttar Pradesh. It is 125 km from Jhansi and 33 km from Lalitpur. The sanctuary is spread over an area of 5.4 km^{2}. Jhansi provides for a wonderful gateway to the Bundelkhand region and has been rendered famous by the legendary Rani Laxmi Bai.

In addition to a variety of birds, the residents include leopard, nilgai, wild boar, sambar, black buck, blue bull, bear, jackals, langur and monkeys. The best time to visit here is from November to April. There is a forest rest house to provide accommodation facilities.
