= M-STrIPES =

Indian tiger monitoring software

M-STrIPES, short for Monitoring System for Tigers - Intensive Protection and Ecological Status, is a software-based monitoring system launched across Indian tiger reserves by the Indian government's National Tiger Conservation Authority (NTCA) in 2010. The system's objective is to strengthen patrolling and surveillance of the Endangered Bengal tiger. Forest guards in tiger reserves are equipped with personal digital assistants and GPS devices to capture data relating to tiger sightings, deaths, wild life crime and ecological observations while patrolling. The software system maps the patrol routes of forest guards, and the resulting data are then analyzed in a geographic information system. This is intended to enhance the effectiveness and spatial coverage of patrols. Additional target outcomes are the evaluation of human pressure and ongoing monitoring of habitat change.

The android-based software will be used across all national Tiger reserves of the country. Use of the system in the Pench Tiger Reserve is reported to have resulted in "a significant check in anti-forest and anti-wildlife activities".
