= Kachhua Sanctuary =

Water sanctuary in Uttar Pradesh, India

Coordinates: 25.280°N 83.016°E

Kachhua Wildlife Sanctuary
- IUCN category IV (habitat/species management area)
- Interactive map of Kachhua Wildlife Sanctuary
- Location: Varanasi district
- Area: 7 km^{2} (2.7 sq mi)
- Established: 21 December 1989

Kachhua Sanctuary is in Varanasi district in Uttar Pradesh, India. Turtles, the Ganges dolphin and other water animals can be found here.

Location 8 km from railway station, spread over the 7 km stretch of River Ganges from Rajghat to Ramnagar, Varanasi, U.P., India Distances 28 km from Babatpur (Varanasi) Airport, by road – Lucknow- Varanasi via Sultanpur-285 km, Via Pratapgarh 302, via Ayodhya 323 km. One can contact the Office of Warden, Turtle Wild Life Sanctuary, Sarnath, Varanasi. Best season – (October–June)

Attractions: Nature and wildlife

How to reach: Can be accessed by boat through the riverfront of Varanasi

Turtle Sanctuary was declared on 21 December 1989. In order to check this biological pollution and to make River Ganges free of pollutants, Ganga Action Plan (GAP) Phase I, has started in the year 1986 by the Govt. of India, with a turtle breeding project with its breeding centre at Sarnath where turtles (both herbivores and carnivores) are hatched and reared for one to one and half year and then are left into River Ganges to remove the bio-pollutants like partly cremated and dead bodies directly thrown in the river. The eggs of these turtles are specially procured from river Chambal. Around 2000 turtles are released annually in the river. Between 1987 and 2010 around 33,356 turtles were released in the River Ganges by the Kashi Wildlife Division's tortoise breeding centre, Sarnath. To protect these turtles and secure their habitat Kachhua Sanctuary, spreading over seven km from Rajghat (Malviya Rail Road Bridge) to Ramnagar Fort, was declared Wildlife Protection Zone, under U.P. Govt. Order (No. 4170/04-3-62/89 dated 21 December 1989) under the provisions of the Wildlife Protection Act 1972, after launching the Ganga Action Plan (GAP). The existence of motor boats and sand mining in the protected zone of the sanctuary is prohibited, as turtles lay eggs in the sand of the river banks. The Turtle Sanctuary has its own importance to clean the water.

In the Kachhua (Turtle) Sanctuary mainly Nilssonia gangetica, Lissemys punctata, Chitra indica (soft-shelled turtles) which are carnivorous species and hard-shelled herbivorous turtles – Geoclemys hamiltonii, Pangshura tentoria, Batagur dhongoka are in abundance. Rohu, bhakur, tengra, prawn, nain, bam etc. fish are also found in the sanctuary. Gangetic dolphin can also be seen especially during rainy season here. Turtles and all other aquatic species are conserved/ protected and efforts are being made to increase their population in this sanctuary.

Fishing and any attempt to tamper with the habitat of the animals found in the sanctuary has been declared a cognizable offence in this stretch of the River Ganges, under 1972 Act. The sanctuary will most probably be denotified to make way for the government's ambitious Haldia-Varanasi Inland Waterways Project along the Ganga. The project requires dredging of the river, which can not be done as long as the sanctuary exists. Incidentally, one of the objectives of declaring this area as a sanctuary was to conserve the Nilssonia gangetica, a carnivorous turtle abundant in this region, which helped in scavenging half burnt corpses dumped in this section of the river and eventually aided in cleaning the river and improve water quality.
