= Vijai Sagar Wildlife Sanctuary =

Protected area in Uttar Pradesh, India

Coordinates: 25.298°N 79.913°E

- IUCN category IV (habitat/species management area)
- Location within Uttar Pradesh Location within India
- Interactive map of Vijai Sagar Wildlife Sanctuary
- Location: Mahoba district, Uttar Pradesh
- Area: 2.62 km^{2} (1.01 sq mi)
- Established: 1990

Vijai {{Sagar Sanctuary is located in Mahoba District of Uttar Pradesh. Vijai Sagar Wildlife Sanctuary was founded in 1990.

== Getting there ==
The nearest railway and bus stations are located at Mahoba about 4 km from the sanctuary.

== Attractions ==
Jackal, mongoose, wildcat and various local and migratory birds occupy the 3 km^{2} of area. The ideal time to visit is from December to February.
