= Ranipur Wildlife Sanctuary =

Tiger Reserve in Chitrakoot district in Uttar Pradesh

Coordinates: 24.968°N 81.064°E

- IUCN category IV (habitat/species management area)
- Interactive map of Ranipur Wildlife Sanctuary
- Location: Chitrakoot district, Uttar Pradesh, India
- Area: 230 km^{2} (89 sq mi)
- Established: 1977

Ranipur Wildlife Sanctuary, founded in 1977, is located in Chitrakoot district of Uttar Pradesh. It is spread over 230 km^{2} and is noted for its diverse wildlife, but is not very frequently visited by tourists because of the difficult access. In 2022, it became a tiger reserve. This is also the Second tiger Reserve in the Bundelkhand region and First in Uttar Pradesh part of Bundelkhand.

Though there are no tigers inside the Sanctuary, the tigers from nearby Panna Tiger Reserve often visits this region.

== Attractions ==
It is the natural habitat of several animals and birds including tigers, leopards, sloth bears, sambars, blackbucks, peafowl, spur fowl, jungle fowl, painted partridge, kingfisher, sparrow, fishing cats and chinkaras.
