= Gulati =

Gulati is a surname found among the Khatri and Arora communities of the Punjab region. Notable people bearing the name Gulati include:

- Aashim Gulati (born 1995), Indian model and actor
- Aman Singh Gulati (born 2000), Indian artist
- Ashok Gulati (born 1954), Indian agricultural economist
- Damodar Gulati, 17th century Punjabi poet
- Dharampal Gulati (1923–2020), Indian businessman
- Gautam Gulati (born 1987), Indian actor
- Harbans Lall Gulati (c. 1896 – 1967), Indian physician
- Himanshu Gulati (born 1988), Norwegian politician
- Jai Gulati, American businessman
- Martha Gulati (born 1969), Canadian physician
- Om Dutt Gulati (1927–2012), Indian pharmacologist
- Parul Gulati (born 1994), Indian actress
- Pavail Gulati, Indian actor
- Ramji Gulati, Indian singer and music producer
- Ranjay Gulati, Indian-American organizational behavior theorist
- Ravi Gulati (born 1973), Indian social activist
- Sakshi Gulati (born 1986), Indian model and actress
- Sanjay Gulati, American child psychiatrist
- Shobna Gulati (born 1966), English actress, writer and dancer
- Shweta Gulati (born 1979), Indian actress
- Sonali Gulati, Indian-American filmmaker and educator
- Sunil Gulati (born 1959), American sports official
- Yash Gulati, Indian orthopedic surgeon

== See also ==
- 21429 Gulati (1998 FG104), a main-belt asteroid discovered in 1998
- Ravi Gulati (EastEnders), fictional character from the BBC TV show EastEnders
