= Sansarpur, Lakhimpur Kheri =

Sansar Pur
- Rural
- Interactive map of Sansar Pur
- Country: India
- State: Uttar Pradesh
- District: Lakhimpur Kheri
- Subdistrict: Gola Gokarannath

Population
  - Total: 10,544
- Time zone: UTC+05:30 (IST)
- Pincode: 262802

Sansarpur is a small town in Lakhimpur Kheri District, Uttar Pradesh. It is situated on NH 730.It has mixed Hindu-Muslim population. Sansarpur village has famous madrasa Ashraful Uloom. There are 6 misques in the village with a Big Jama Masjid. Famous educationist and Scholar Dr. Mohammad Asjad Ansari is basically from this village. And many scholars belongs from sansarpur

== Demographics ==
As of 2011 Indian Census, Sansar Pur had a total population of 10,544, of which 5,585 were males and 4,959 were females. Population within the age group of 0 to 6 years was 1718.
