= State Highway 90 (Uttar Pradesh) =

Road in Uttar Pradesh, India

State Highway 90

Route information
- Length: 91.030 km (56.563 mi)

Location
- Country: India
- States: Uttar Pradesh: 91.030 km (56.6 mi)
- Primary destinations: Lakhimpur - Bijua - Palia - Gauriphanta

Highway system
- Roads in India; Expressways; National; State; Asian

Uttar Pradesh State Highway 90 (UP SH 90) passes through Lakhimpur - Bijua - Palia - Gauriphanta and covers a distance of 91.030 km (56.6 mi).

Uttar Pradesh state in India has a series of road networks, there are 35 national highways with total length of 4,635 km (2,880 mi) and 83 state highways with total length of 8,432 km (5,239 mi).

== See also ==
- State highway
- State Highway (India)
- Lakhimpur Kheri district
- Dudhwa National Park
