= Bansgaon, Lakhimpur Kheri =

Village in Uttar Pradesh, India

Bansgaon is a village in Lakhimpur Kheri district, Uttar Pradesh, India. It is 35 km away from the district city. It has a population of around 15,000.
