= Galwa =

Human settlement in Nepal

Coordinates: 29°40′N 81°52′E

Galwa is a small town in the mid-western region of Nepal. It is located at 29°40'0N 81°52'0E at an altitude of 1662 m (5456 ft) near to the Karnali River.
