= Ravi Gulati =

Ravi Gulati may refer to:

- Ravi Gulati (activist) (born 1969), Indian social activist
- Ravi Gulati (EastEnders), a fictional character in the British soap opera EastEnders
