= Suheli River =

River in Uttar Pradesh, India

The Suheli River forms the southern boundary of the Dudhwa National Park and is considered the park's "life line". It is a major river of the park, which is considered one of the last areas of productive Terai ecosystems in India.

The Suheli, along with the Sharda and Mohana, drains into the Ghagra River system.

South Asian river dolphins possibly occur near the confluence of the Suheli with the Ghagha (Ghaghara), but there have been no surveys to confirm this.
