= Gauriphanta =

Gauriphanta Gorifonta Gauriphatak
- Village
- Location in Uttar Pradesh, India Gauriphanta (India)
- Coordinates: 28.68113°N 80.55434°E
- Country: India
- State: Uttar Pradesh
- District: Lakhimpur Kheri

Population (2011)
  - Total: Nearly 5,000

Languages
  - Official: Hindi, Nepali
- Time zone: UTC+5:30 (IST)
- Lok Sabha constituency: Kheri
- Mailani Vidhan Sabha constituency: ?

Gauriphanta is a village in on the bank of River Mohana in North of Lakhimpur Kheri district in the Indian state of Uttar Pradesh, located on the border with Nepal across from the city Dhangadhi.

== Transport ==
Gauriphanta is on State Highway No. 70. It was also a terminal railway station on the Mailani-Dudhwa-Gauriphanta Meter Gauge line before services were withdrawn in 2004. Nepalese and Indian nationals may cross the border without restrictions, however there is a customs checkpoint for goods and third country nationals. The railway line is set to be revived in Narrow Gauge as part of Dudhwa Forest Railway for doing safari in Dudhwa National Park.

== See also ==
Dudhwa National Park
