= Mohammadi, Uttar Pradesh =

Mufti Kaleem Ahmad Rasoolpuri

Mohammadi
- Town
- Location in Uttar Pradesh, India Mohammadi (India)
- Coordinates: 27°57′N 80°13′E
- Country: India
- State: Uttar Pradesh
- District: Lakhimpur Kheri

Population (2001)
  - Total: 38,427

Languages
  - Official: Hindi
- Time zone: UTC+5:30 (IST)
- Vehicle registration: UP31
- Website: up.gov.in

Mohammadi is a town and a municipal board in Lakhimpur Kheri district in the Indian state of Uttar Pradesh. The town and nearby area is known for sugarcane farming. Mohammadi is also known for a special kind of flower known as 'Ketki Flower'. The fragrance from this flower, only available in Mohammadi, spreads in the whole bagh and nearby areas.

== Demographics ==
Religions in Mohammadi
| Religion | Percent |
| Hindus | 55% |
| Muslims | 44% |
| Jains | 0.5% |
| Others† | 0.5% |
Distribution of religions †Includes Sikhs (0.2%), Buddhists (<0.2%).

As of the 2001 Census of India, Mohammadi had a population of 38,427. Males constitute 53% of the population and females 47%. Mohammadi has an average literacy rate of 48%, lower than the national average of 59.5%: male literacy is 53%, and female literacy is 43%. In Mohammadi, 16% of the population is under 6 years of age.

== Tourism ==
Tourist places include Mohammadi Tiger Reserve in Maheshpur, Gola Road, Mehndi Bagh, Kothi Nawab Chabban Sahab (Nawab Sahab ki Kothi), Devisthan Mandir, Shri Hanuman Mandir, Tedhenath Shiv Mandir, Grand Jama Masjid, Gurudwara and a Jangali Nath Shiv mandir..

== Education ==
Mohammadi has three degree colleges for getting higher education, named Ganna Kisan Mahavidyalaya, Krishna Mahavidyalaya and Mohammadi Mahavidyalaya. Some local inter colleges are (1) J P Inter College (2) P D Inter College (3) R P Inter College (4) Doon Public School and (5) Yugnirman Kanya Vidyalaya.
