= Singahi Bhiraura =

Singahi Bhedaura
- town
- Location in Uttar Pradesh, India
- Coordinates: 28°18′57.91″N 80°53′35.22″E
- Country: India
- State: Uttar Pradesh
- District: Lakhimpur Kheri

Population (2001)
  - Total: 17,125
- Time zone: UTC+5:30 (IST)
- PIN: 262905

Singahi Bhedaura is a town and a nagar panchayat in Lakhimpur Kheri district in the state of Uttar Pradesh, India.

== Characteristics ==
Singahi Bhedaura is located in Kheri District, and lies on the Lakhimpur-Nighasan-Dudwa route. It is about 5 km from Motipur, 10 km from Nighasan, 11 km from Rakehti and 16 km from Banbirpur.

The town has hosted, in its heyday The Prince of Wales, Senators of America, Cricketer Edward Jardine, Viceroys, Governors, prominent politicians among others.

The station situated at BELRAYAN(around 10 km) is the nearest railway facility and is a branchline with links to Bareilly, Gonda and Lucknow. The nearest airport is Chaudhary Charan Singh International Airport, which serves Lucknow.

== Demographics ==
As of 2001 India census, Singahi Bhedaura had a population of 17,125. Males constitute 52% of the population and females 48%. The town had an average literacy rate of 37%, lower than the national average of 59.5%: male literacy was 43% and female literacy 30%. 16% of the population is under 6 years of age.
