= State Highway 93 (Uttar Pradesh) =

Road in Uttar Pradesh, India

State Highway 93

Route information
- Length: 58.62 km (36.42 mi)

Location
- Country: India
- States: Uttar Pradesh: 58.62 km (36.42 mi)
- Primary destinations: Gola (Lakhimpur) - Shahjanhapur

Highway system
- Roads in India; Expressways; National; State; Asian

Uttar Pradesh State Highway 93 (UP SH 93) starts from Gola (Lakhimpur) and goes to Shahjanhapur and covers a distance of 58.62 km.

Uttar Pradesh state in India has a series of road networks, there are 35 national highways with total length of 4635 km and 83 state highways with total length of 8,432 km (5,239 mi).

== See also ==
- State highway
- State Highway (India)
- Lakhimpur Kheri district
- Dudhwa National Park
