= Lakhahi =

Village in Uttar Pradesh, India

- Village
- Location in Uttar Pradesh, India Lakhahi (India) Lakhahi (Asia)
- Coordinates: 28.16°N 80.97°E the
- Country: India
- State: Uttar Pradesh
- District: Lakhimpur Kheri
- Established in: 1461
- Founder: Raja Kalyan Mal Rathore

Government
  - Type: Sarpanch (Pradhan)
  - Body: Gram panchayat and Nyaya panchayat

Population (2011)
  - Total: 5,510
- Vehicle registration: UP- 31
- Website: kheri.nic.in

Lakhahi is a village, large Gram panchayat and a Nyaya Panchayat in Dhaurehra tehsil Lakhimpur Kheri district, Uttar Pradesh state, India.

Lakhahi historically served as the seat of an estate belonging to a branch of the Rathore's of Jodhpur. The Royal house is the descendants of the legendary Rao Siha Ji, founder of Rathore dynasty who was the son of Raja Jai Chand Gaharwar of Kannauj.

Lakhahi has a bazar known as dhakherwa chauraha or Lakhahiganj, and it hosts both a permanent market and a weekly haat.[2] The haat is held thrice per week, on Wednesday, Friday and Sundays, and it mostly involves trade in cloth and vegetables.It was earlier famous for ketki Flowers. Ketki were found in the royal foolbagh which was of rulers of Lakhahi

== History ==
Lakhahi Raj was a historical taluqdari or a zamindari estate situated in present-day Lakhimpur Kheri district in the Awadh region of Uttar Pradesh, ruled primarily by Rajput chiefs who exercised hereditary control over a group of villages under the taluqdari system. Emerging during the Mughal period as a zamindari holding, the estate functioned as a semi-autonomous unit responsible for revenue collection, local administration, and maintenance of order while acknowledging the sovereignty of the Mughal Empire and later the Nawabs of Awadh. With the annexation of Awadh by the British East India Company in 1856, traditional land arrangements were altered, and during the Indian Rebellion of 1857, taluqdars across Awadh, including those of Lakhahi, were affected by shifting loyalties and British reprisals, though many estates were subsequently restored under revised colonial policies to ensure stability. The estate's economy was predominantly agrarian, supported by fertile Terai lands and forest resources, and the ruling family held social prestige within the Rajput community, often patronizing religious and cultural institutions. Following India's independence, the implementation of the Uttar Pradesh Zamindari Abolition and Land Reforms Act, 1950 abolished intermediary land rights, leading to the dissolution of Lakhahi Raj as a legal estate and transferring land ownership to cultivators, after which the former ruling family retained social recognition but no formal administrative authority, leaving the estate as a part of the historical legacy of Awadh's princely system.
