= Martha Gulati =

Canadian physician

- Born: 1969 (age 56–57); Columbus, Ohio
- Education: University of Chicago; University of Toronto; McMaster University
- Scientific career
- Workplaces: Ohio State University; University of Arizona

Martha Gulati (born 1969) is the past Chief of Cardiology at the University of Arizona, Phoenix. She previously held the Sarah Ross Soter Chair in Women’s Cardiovascular Health at the Ohio State University. Gulati is the Chair of the National Chest Pain Guidelines. She is the author of the popular science book Saving Women’s Heart and Editor-in-Chief of materials for the American College of Cardiology programme CardioSmart.

== Early life and education ==
Gulati was born in Columbus, Ohio. She grew up in Canada, and was an undergraduate student in general sciences at McMaster University. She attended medical school at the University of Toronto. She moved to the United States for her graduate studies, where she completed an internship and residency at the Northwestern University. She completed a Master's degree in Cardiovascular Science at the University of Chicago in 2002.

== Research and career ==
After completing her training at Northwestern University and the Rush University Medical Center, Gulati joined the faculty at Ohio State University. Her research considers women's health, with a particular focus on cardiac diseases. In 2011 Gulati published Saving Women's Hearts, which explored women's health and cardiovascular disease. At Ohio State University Gulati served as the Sarah Ross Soter Chair in Women’s Cardiovascular Health. She was appointed as Editor-in-Chief of the American College of Cardiology education platform CardioSmart.org in 2015. In 2016 Gulati was made the Division Chief of Cardiology at the University of Arizona.

Gulati was the 2021 President of the American Society for Preventive Cardiology.

== Awards and honours ==
- 2005 Crain’s Chicago Business Top 40 under 40
- 2011 American College of Cardiology Coalition to Reduce Racial and Ethnic Disparities in Cardiovascular Outcomes
- 2012 National Red Dress Award
- 2017 Outstanding Women in Business
- 2019 Most Influential Woman in Arizona
- 2019 American College of Cardiology’s Bernadine Healy Award
- 2023 Arthur S. Agatston Cardiovascular Disease Prevention Award
- 2026 Dr. Carolyn McCue Award for Woman Cardiologist of the Year

== Select publications ==
- Gulati, Martha; Dilip K Pandey; Arnsdorf, Morton; Diane S Lauderdale; Thisted, Ronald Aaron; Roxanne H Wicklund; Arfan J Al-Hani; Henry R Black (2003). "Exercise capacity and the risk of death in women: the St James Women Take Heart Project". Circulation. 108 (13): 1554–1559. doi:10.1161/01.cir.0000091080.57509.e9. PMID 12975254. Wikidata Q73944143.
- G. F. Fletcher; P. A. Ades; P. Kligfield; et al. (2013). "Exercise Standards for Testing and Training: A Scientific Statement From the American Heart Association". Circulation. 128 (8): 873–934. doi:10.1161/cir.0b013e31829b5b44. PMID 23877260. Wikidata Q56796368.
- Gulati, Martha; Henry R Black; Leslee J Shaw; Arnsdorf, Morton; Merz, Noel; Lauer, Michael; Thomas H Marwick; Dilip K Pandey; Roxanne H Wicklund; Thisted, Ronald Aaron (2005). "The prognostic value of a nomogram for exercise capacity in women". The New England Journal of Medicine. 353 (5): 468–475. doi:10.1056/nejmoa044154. PMID 16079370. Wikidata Q44385161.

=== Books ===
- Gulati, Martha (2011). Saving women's hearts : how you can prevent and reverse heart disease with natural and conventional strategies. Sherry Torkos. Mississauga, Ont.: J. Wiley & Sons Canada. ISBN 978-0-470-67845-9. OCLC 669751096.
