= Barwar, Lakhimpur Kheri =

Barwar
- Town and village
- Location in Uttar Pradesh, India Barwar (India)
- Coordinates: 25°30′21″N 79°08′23″E
- Country: India
- State: Uttar Pradesh
- District: Kheri

Population (2001)
  - Total: 21,000

Languages
  - Official: Hindi
- Time zone: UTC+5:30 (IST)

Barwar is a town and a nagar panchayat in Lakhimpur Kheri district in the state of Uttar Pradesh, India. It is a crowded town situated near the shahjahanpur. The Gomti river flows through the town. The town is divided into 11 wards.

== Demographics ==
As of 2001 India census,
