= Bajaj Hindusthan =

Sugar factory in India

Bajaj Hindusthan Sugar Ltd
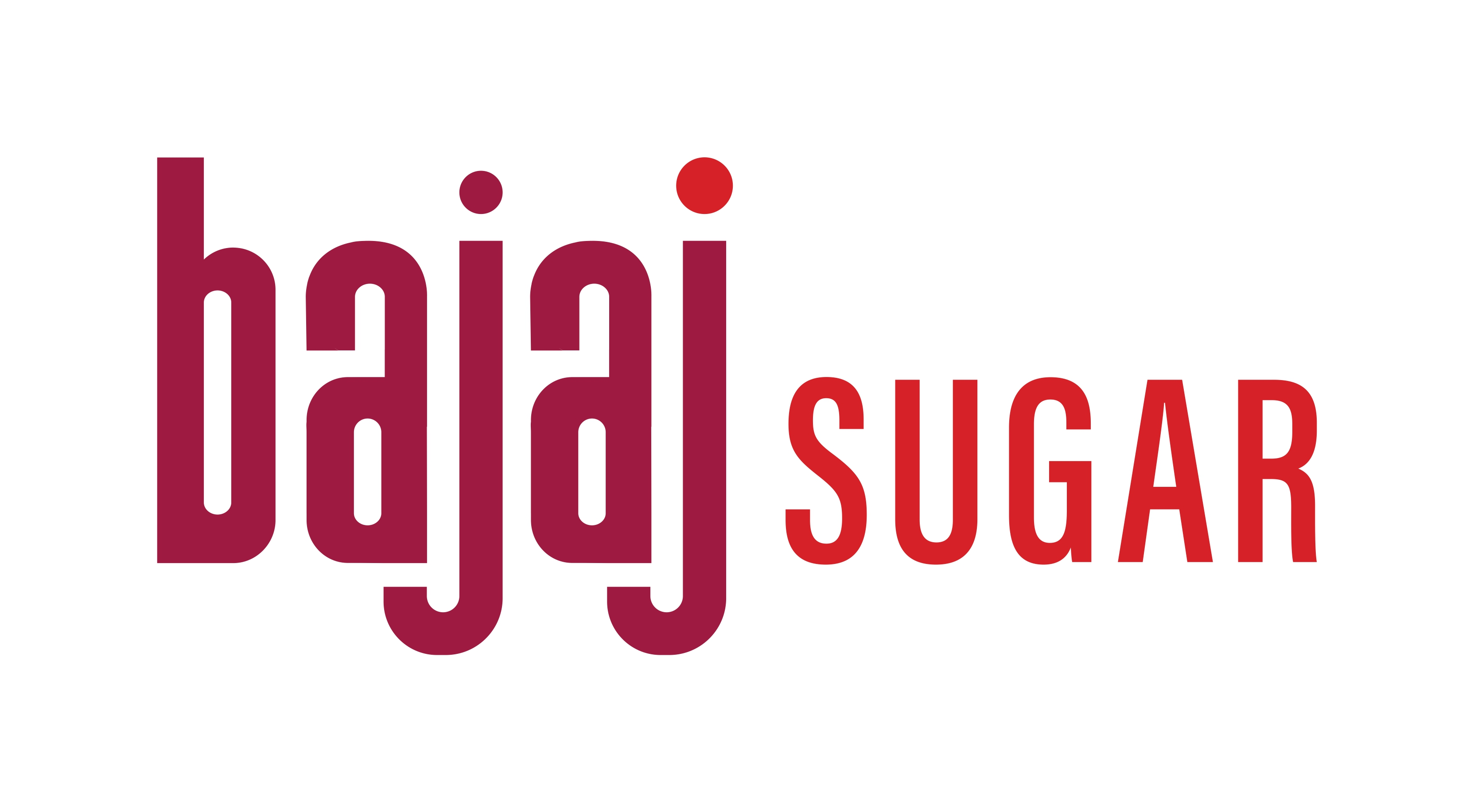
- Formerly: Hindusthan Sugar Mills Limited (1931–1988)
- Type: Public
- Traded as: BSE: 500032 NSE: BAJAJHIND
- Industry: Sugar
- Founded: 23 November 1931; 94 years ago
- Founder: Jamnalal Bajaj
- Headquarters: Mumbai, Maharashtra, India
- Area served: Uttar Pradesh
- Key people: Kushagra Bajaj (chairman); Ajay Kumar Sharma (Managing Director); Sunil Kumar Ojha (CFO)
- Products: Sugar, Ethanol, distillery and sugar byproducts
- Revenue: ▼₹6,104 crore (US$650 million) (2024)
- Net income: ▼₹−87 crore (US$−9.3 million) (2024)
- Number of employees: 7,314 (including 5,553 workers) (2024)
- Website: www.bajajhindusthan.com

Bajaj Hindusthan Sugar Ltd. (BHSL) is a sugar producer in India. It has an aggregated sugarcane crushing capacity of 136,000 tonnes crushed per day (TCD), and alcohol distillation capacity of 800 kilo liters per day (KLD) across 14 locations in the north Indian state of Uttar Pradesh. The company also produces green fuel ethanol. It is a member of Bajaj Group. The company is headquartered in Mumbai.

The site selected for the first plant was at Gola Gokarannath in district Lakhimpur Kheri in the Terai region of Uttar Pradesh (UP), an area rich in sugar cane. Another sugar plant with a cane crushing capacity of 1400 TCD was set up in 1972 at Palia Kalan, a large cane supplying centre about 70 kilometres from Gola Gokarannath.

Kushagra Bajaj is the Chairman of Bajaj Hindusthan Sugar Ltd.

== History ==
The company was founded as Hindusthan Sugar Mills Limited by Jamnalal Bajaj in 1931. In 1988, it was renamed Bajaj Hindusthan Sugar Limited.
