= Lakhimpur Kheri district =

- District of Uttar Pradesh
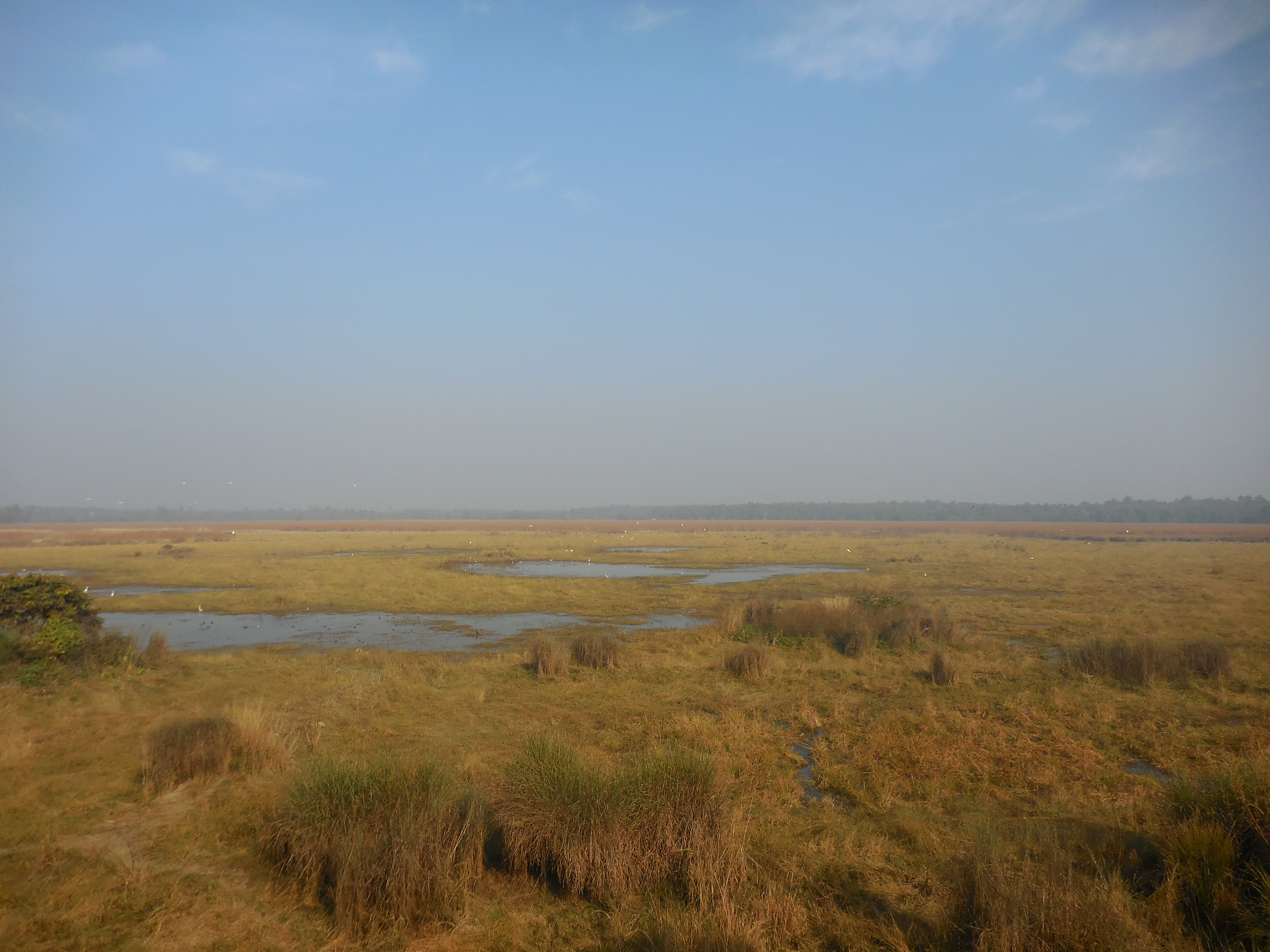
- Marshes of Dudhwa National Park

- Location of Lakhimpur Kheri district in Uttar Pradesh
- Coordinates (Lakhimpur, Uttar Pradesh): 27.6°N 80.34°E - 28.6°N 81.30°E
- Country: India
- State: Uttar Pradesh
- Division: Lucknow
- Headquarters: Lakhimpur

Government
  - Lok Sabha constituencies: Kheri, Dhaurahra

Area
  - District of Uttar Pradesh: 7,680 km^{2} (2,970 sq mi)

Population (2011)
  - District of Uttar Pradesh: 4,021,243
  - Density: 524/km^{2} (1,360/sq mi)
  - Urban: 461,035

Demographics
  - Literacy: 60.10 % (in 2011 census
  - Sex ratio: 894
- Time zone: UTC+05:30 (IST)
- Website: http://kheri.nic.in

Lakhimpur Kheri district is the largest district in Uttar Pradesh, India, on the border with Nepal. Its administrative capital is the city of Lakhimpur.

Lakhimpur Kheri district is a part of Lucknow division, with a total area of 7,680 square kilometres (2,970 sq mi). The national government designated Lakhimpur Kheri as a Minority Concentrated District on the basis of 2001 census data, which identifies it as requiring urgent aid to improve living standards and amenities.

Dudhwa National Park, and Pilibhit Tiger reserve are in Lakhimpur Kheri and are the only national park in Uttar Pradesh. They are home to many rare and endangered species including 65+ Tigers, leopards, swamp deer, hispid hares and Bengal florican.

== Etymology ==
Etymologically Lakhimpur was known as Luxmipur.

Kheri is a town 2 kilometres (1.2 mi) from Lakhimpur. Theory suggests that the name derives from the khair trees that once covered large tracts in the area.

== History ==
The early history of Lakhimpur Kheri district is obscure, but it has many ancient ruins, and several places are associated with episodes in the Mahabharata. According to tradition, this area was once under the rule of the Lunar race of Hastinapur. The village of Balmiar-Barkhar, near Muhamdi, is popularly identified as the capital of the ancient Virata Kingdom, although this is more commonly located in Rajasthan. Kundalpur, near Khairigarh, is said to be where Krishna carried off Rukmini, and Kheri itself is held to be where Kshemakarna performed the sacrifice to drive out the Nagas. (Ahar, in Bulandshahr district, is also popularly identified as the site of both episodes.)

One of the earliest known finds in the district is a stone horse of the 4th-century king Samudra Gupta (the fragmentary inscription mentions his name), which formerly stood in a heavily forested area near Khairigarh and has since been moved to the Lucknow Museum. This king of Magadha performed Ashvamedha yajna in which a horse is left to freely roam in the entire nation, so as to display the power of king and to underline the importance of his conquest. As in much of Awadh, coins of the 9th-century king Bhoja Deva of Kannauj are commonly found in Lakhimpur Kheri district.

This area was supposedly once ruled by the Pasis, although no traces of this remain today. Most of the cultivated areas in the district have been historically ruled by Rajputs and Muslims instead. The earliest Rajput clan known in the area are the Bachhil, who are described as rulers in an inscription at Dewal (in Pilibhit district) dated to 992 CE. The Bachhils probably ruled over the northern and western parts of Lakhimpur Kheri district, and they had strongholds at Barkhar, near Muhamdi; Kamp, on the Sarda; Nigohi, in modern Shahjahanpur district; and Garh Gajana near Dewal. The Ahbans are the only other early Rajput known to have been here at an early date; they came to the region at the time of the first Muslim conquests and ruled from Pataunja in today's Sitapur district.

As for the Muslims, they appear to have arrived in this district at a later date than elsewhere. There are no local traditions of the Muslim folk hero Ghazi Sayyid Salar Masud here, in contrast to neighboring Bahraich district, and Muslim rule was only established very gradually and was never very strongly felt. Lakhimpur Kheri was then something of a backwater, very heavily forested and barely mentioned in contemporary sources. One tradition attributes the fort of Khairigarh to Muhammad bin Tughlaq, but it is more commonly said to have been built in 1379 under Firoz Shah Tughlaq instead. Khairigarh was one of several forts constructed along the northern frontier, on the north bank of the Sarju, in order to protect the lowlands against incursions from Doti and Nepal. However, these forts were supposedly abandoned shortly after completion and remained so for centuries.

=== Mughal era ===
At some point, the city of Khairabad (in today's Sitapur district) became a seat of Muslim government, but exactly when is not clear. During the reign of Akbar, Khairabad formed a sarkar of Awadh Subah, and most of the present-day district belonged to this sarkar. 8 of its 22 mahals, or parganas, lay partly or entirely in the area covered by the present district. The first of these was Barwar-Anjana, a vast mahal that was mostly covered by forest. It included the later parganas of Muhamdi, Magdapur, Atwa Piparia, Pasgawan (which has the namesake village of Barwar), and Aurangabad, as well as Ahmadnagar and Pindarwa in modern Hardoi district. Barwar-Anjana remained a single territorial unit until the time of Ibadullah Khan, who ruled as Raja of Muhamdi in the early 1700s. In the Ain-i-Akbari, this mahal is described as being ruled by Brahmins and Rajputs (although which clan is not specified), mustering an infantry force of 1,000 and a cavalry force of 50, and providing a revenue of 4,325, 237 dams to the imperial treasury.

Bordering Barwar-Anjana was the mahal of Bhurwara, which was also heavily forested and not extensively cultivated. It included the later parganas of Haidarabad, Bhur, and Kukra Mailani, although its boundaries were never clearly defined, and it was ruled by the Ahbans. The mahal of Khairigarh also had imprecise boundaries; besides the later pargana of the same name, it included the area that would later become the Nighasan and Palia parganas, as well as the northern half of Dhaurahra. The Ain-i-Akbari calls Khairigarh one of the most important forts in Hindustan, and the landowners in this mahal consisted of various Rajput clans: Bais, Bisen's, and Bachhils, as well as an unknown group called "Kahanah".

In the southern part of the present-day district was the mahal of Paila, which was smaller at that point than it would later become; it was ruled by the Ahbans. The mahal of Kheri included the later pargana of Srinagar along with most of Kheri pargana. Kheri itself had a fort made of burnt brick. The remaining part of Kheri pargana was then part of the small mahal of Basara, which consisted of the southwestern corner between the Sarayan and Jamwari rivers. Finally, the later pargana of Kasta formed part of the large mahal of Nimkhar, which was mostly based in present-day Sitapur district.

A small part of the current district was included in the sarkar of Bahraich at the time of Akbar. The mahal of Firozabad, ruled by the Tomar Rajputs, probably covered the southern part of the later Dhaurahra pargana in addition to Firozabad. It mustered a "surprisingly large" force of 8,000 infantry and 200 cavalry, and there was a brick fort at its headquarters.

From Akbar's time until the end of the 1700s, the history of Lakhimpur Kheri district is essentially the history of the various zamindari dynasties that ruled the area. The greatest of these was the Sayyids of Barwar, who had originally been granted a large estate in Hardoi district by Akbar. Muqtadi Khan, the great-grandson of the original grantee, was "entrusted with the management of Barwar" after the death of the former Bachhil ruler there. He then built a large fort at Barwar, and he greatly expanded his territory during the reign of Aurangzeb before dying in 1683.

Some of the Rajput States of the district estd. before Mughal era were Isanagar, Jhandi and Lakhahi. Oel and Singahi were established in Mughal era.

Under the Nawabs of Awadh, the old system of sarkars and mahals remained in use until the reign of Asaf-ud-Daula, who replaced them with chaklas. The entire area of Lakhimpur Kheri district was included in the chakla of Khairabad, which also included most of Hardoi and Sitapur districts, but at times Muhamdi formed a separate chakla, and some of the southeastern parganas were occasionally put under the chakla of Bahraich.

=== Modern era ===
In the year 1801, when Rohilkhand was ceded to the British, part of this district was included in the cession, but after the Anglo–Nepalese War of 1814–1816 it was restored to Oudh. On the annexation of Oudh in 1856 the west of the present area was formed into a district called Mohammadi and the east into Mallanpur, which also included part of Sitapur. In the Indian Rebellion of 1857 Mohammadi became one of the chief centres of Indian independence movement in northern Oudh. The refugees from Shahjahanpur reached Mohammadi on 2 June 1857, and two days later Mohammadi was abandoned, most of the British party were shot down on the way to Sitapur, and the survivors died or were murdered later in Lucknow. The British officials in Mallanpur, with a few who had fled from Sitapur, escaped to Nepal, where later on most of them died. Till October 1858, British officials did not make any other attempt to regain control of the district. By the end of 1858 British officials regained the control and the headquarters of the single district then formed were moved to Lakhlmpur shortly afterwards.

== Geography ==
The district lies within the Terai lowlands at the base of the Himalayas, with several rivers and lush green vegetation. Situated between 27.6° and 28.6° north latitude and 80.34° and 81.30° east longitudes, and about 7,680 square kilometres (2,970 sq mi) in area, it is roughly triangular in shape, the flattened apex pointing north. The district is located at about the height of 147 meters above sea level. Lakhimpur Kheri is bounded on the north by the river Mohan, separating it from Nepal; on the east by the Kauriala river (branch of the Ghaghara), separating it from Bahraich; on the south by Sitapur and Hardoi; and on the west by Pilibhit and Shahjahanpur.

=== Climate ===
The climate is hot throughout the year except the rainy seasons. During summer(March to June), the temperature can reach above 40 °C (104 °F) and in winters(October to February) it can drop to around 4 °C (39 °F). The nights are very cold during winter and fog is very common in this season. The annual average rainfall in Lakhimpur Kheri is 1,085.3 millimetres (42.73 in), mostly in the monsoon months (July to September).

=== Rivers ===
Several rivers flow across Lakhimpur. Some of these are Sharda, Ghagra, Koriyala, Ull, Sarayan, Chauka, Gomti, Kathana, Sarayu and Mohana.

Sharda Barrage

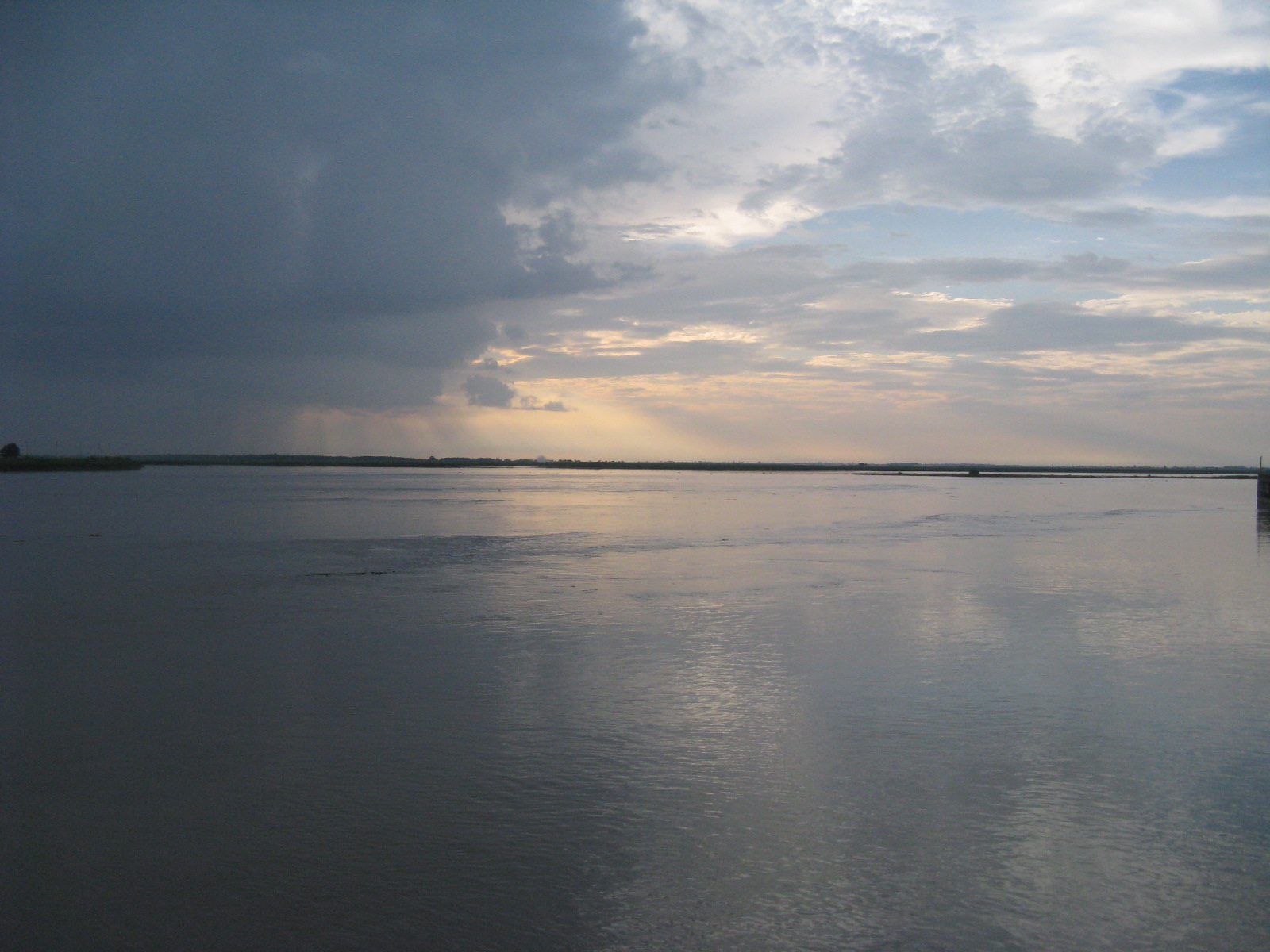
Sharda River near Sharda Barrage

The Lower Sharda Barrage is constructed on the Sharda River, about 163.5 kilometres (101.6 mi) downstream of the Upper Sharda Barrage, and nearly 28 kilometres (17 mi) from Lakhimpur city. This project is part of the Sharda Sahayak Pariyojana (SSP) and primarily depends on water diverted from the Karnali (Ghaghra) at Girjapur through the Sharda Sahayak link canal of 28.4 kilometres (17.6 mi) length for over eight months in the year during the lean season; but it indents on Sharda supplies during the monsoon between July and October when the Karnali carries a lot of silt.

The SSP aims at irrigating culturable command area (CCA) of 16,770 km^{2} with 70 per cent irrigation intensity. The 258.80 kilometres (160.81 mi) long feeder channel of SSP takes off from the right bank of Sharda Barrage with discharge of 650 m^{3}/s. Supplies are then fed into the different branches of the Sharda canal system, namely, the Daryabad branch, the Barabanki branch, the Haidergarh branch, the Rae Bareli branch and the Purva branch.

SSP provides protective canal irrigation for cultivable area of 2 m ha to lakhs of farmers in 150 development blocks of 16 districts in eastern Uttar Pradesh. The project was commissioned in 1974, and completed in 2000 with an estimated cost of 1300 crore rupees(₹ 13,00,00,00,000).

=== Flora and fauna ===
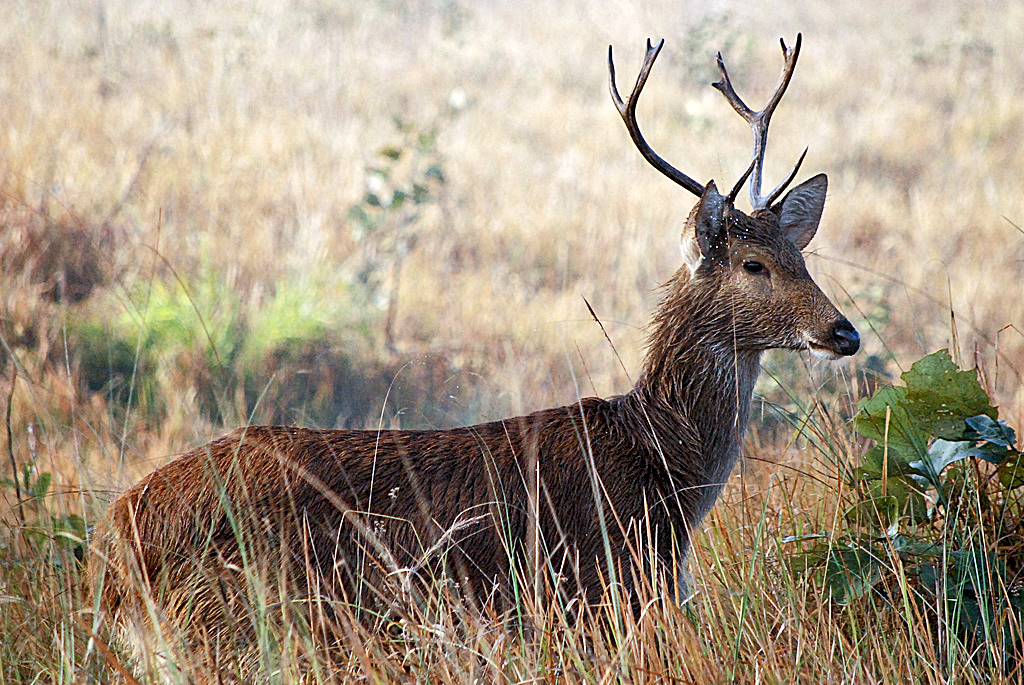
Swamp deer

Dudhwa Tiger Reserve in Lakhimpur Kheri has two core areas, Dudhwa National Park and Kishanpur Wildlife Sanctuary, which were merged in 1987. Dudhwa National Park is known as the first National Park of the state after the formation of Uttarakhand and is a national protected area. It is home to many rare and endangered species including tigers, leopards, rhinoceros, hispid hare, elephants, black deer and swamp deer. Dudhwa has approximately 400 species of birds including egrets, cormorants, herons and several species of duck, goose and teal. Its swamps and lakes are particularly attractive to water birds, including varieties that migrate here from the Himalayas to spend the winter months. Bird watching is common at the Banke Tal.

The visit of Sir D.B. Brandis in 1860 to the area culminated in a 303 kilometres (188 mi) forest area of the present day Dudhwa National Park being brought under the control of Government in 1861 for preservation. In Kheri District all the Sal and miscellaneous forests and grasslands in Kharigarh Pargana, between the Mohana and Suheli rivers, were included in the then North Kheri Forest Division. More areas were reserved for protection between 1867 and 1879 and added to the Division. The area of the Division was legally constituted as Reserved Forests in 1937.

The Sonaripur Sanctuary, comprising 15.7 square kilometres (6.1 sq mi), was created in 1958 to specifically protect swamp deer (Cervus duvaceli duvaceli). The area was too small and was later enlarged to 212 square kilometres (82 sq mi) and renamed as Dudhwa Sanctuary in 1968. Later, more area was added to the Sanctuary and in 1977, it was declared Dudhwa National Park. The total area of the Park was 616 square kilometres (238 sq mi) of which 490 square kilometres (190 sq mi) was the core zone and the balance of 124 square kilometres (48 sq mi) was a buffer zone.

The area was established in 1958 as a wildlife sanctuary. On 1 February 1977 wildlife sanctuary became a national park and after 11 years in 1988 it was established as a tiger reserve. Dudhwa Tiger Reserve lies on the India-Nepal border in the foothills of the Himalaya. Dudhwa Tiger Reserve was created in 1987–88 comprising Dudhwa National Park and Kishanpur Sanctuary (227 square kilometres (88 sq mi)). With an addition of 66 square kilometres (25 sq mi) to the buffer zone in 1997, the present area of the tiger reserve is 884 square kilometres (341 sq mi). Distance from Lakhimpur railway station to Dudhwa is about 100 kilometres (62 mi) by road.

== Demographics ==
Historical population
Year	Pop.	±% p.a.
1901	905,158	—
1911	959,225	+0.58%
1921	913,496	−0.49%
1931	944,502	+0.33%
1941	1,024,051	+0.81%
1951	1,058,373	+0.33%
1961	1,258,433	+1.75%
1971	1,486,590	+1.68%
1981	1,952,680	+2.76%
1991	2,419,234	+2.17%
2001	3,207,232	+2.86%
2011	4,021,243	+2.29%

Religions in Lakhimpur Kheri district (2011)
Religion	Percent
Hinduism	76.55%
Islam	20.08%
Sikhism	2.35%
Buddhism	0.46%
Other or not stated	0.56%
Distribution of religions

According to the 2011 census Lakhimpur Kheri District has a population of 4,021,243 roughly equal to the nation of Liberia or the US state of Oregon.

This gives it a ranking of 56th in India (out of a total of 640). The district has a population density of 523 inhabitants per square kilometre (1,350/sq mi). Its population growth rate over the decade 2001–2011 was 25.38%. Kheri has a sex ratio of 894 females for every 1000 males, and a literacy rate of 60.56%. 11.47% of the population lived in urban areas. Scheduled Castes and Scheduled Tribes made up 26.40% and 1.33% of the population respectively. The tribal population are Tharus living along the Nepal border.

Languages of Lakhimpur Kheri district (2011)
1. Hindi (93.2%)
2. Urdu (3.10%)
3. Punjabi (1.83%)
4. Bhojpuri (1.36%)
5. Others (0.46%)

At the time of the 2011 Census of India, 93.25% of the population in the district spoke Hindi (or a related language), 3.10% Urdu, 1.83% Punjabi and 1.36% Bhojpuri as their first language.

Languages spoken here include Awadhi, a vernacular in the Hindi dialect continuum spoken by over 38 million people, mainly in the Awadh region.

== Economy ==
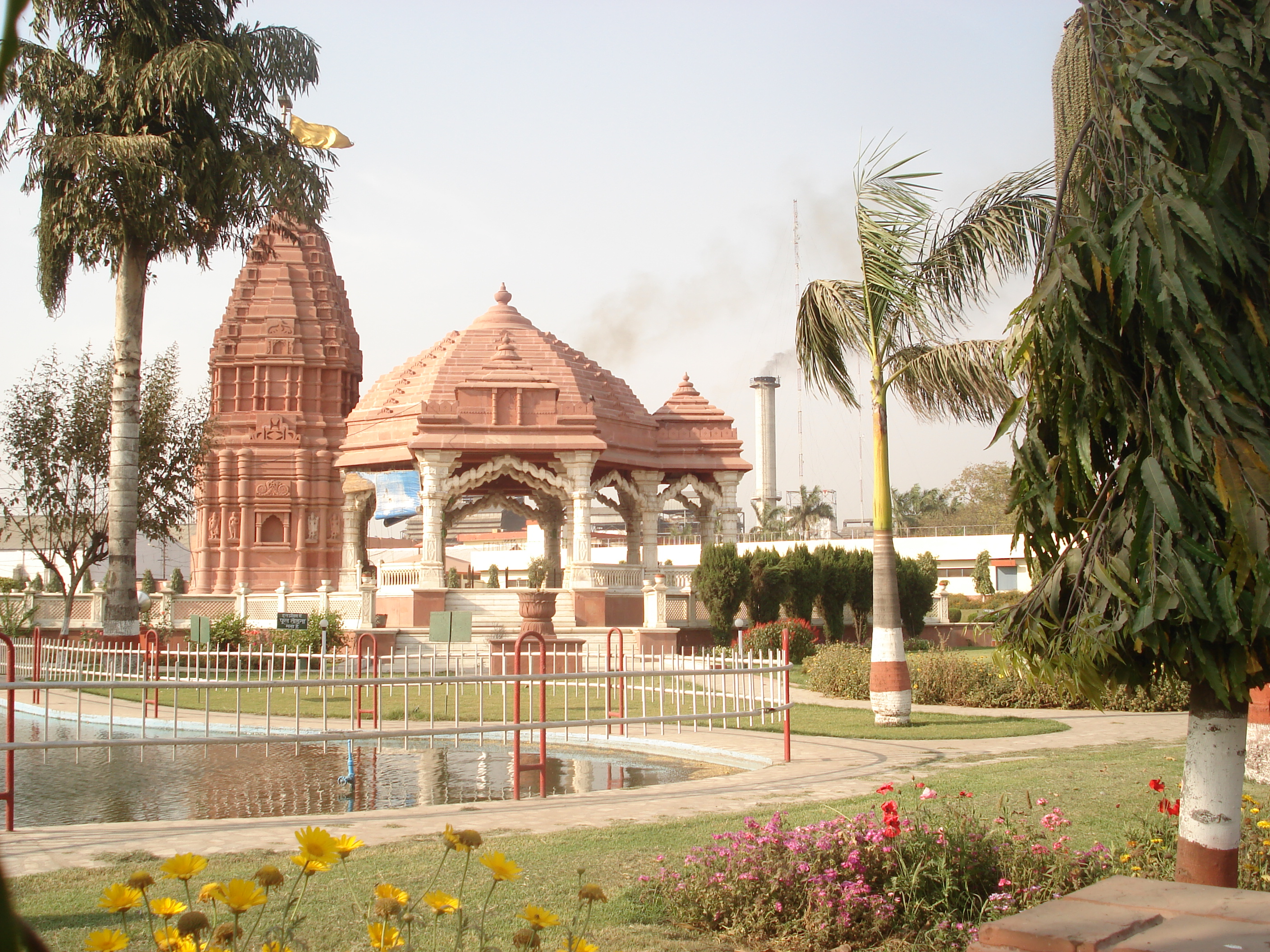
Bajaj Hindusthan Limited (BHL) sugar plant, Gola Gokarannath

It is one of the 34 districts in Uttar Pradesh currently receiving funds from the Backward Regions Grant Fund Programme (BRGF).

=== Agriculture ===
Wheat, rice, maize, barley, and pulses are the major food crops. Recently farmers have started menthol mint farming in the district, as being the Terai region it is ideal for mint cultivation Sugar is mainly produced by most of the farmers. Sugar-cane and oilseeds are the chief non-food crops. Sugar-cane is grown and processed in this district, forming the backbone of the local economy.

=== Industry ===
Some of India's second largest sugar mills are in the district. Bajaj Hindusthan Limited (BHL) sugar plant in Gola Gokarannath and Bajaj Hindusthan Limited (BHL) sugar plant in Palia Kalan are the a sugar mill unit of balrampur sugar mill in kumbhi there are three largest sugar mills in Asia.

In 2008 the Steel Authority of India Limited (SAIL) announced it would construct a major steel processing plant in Behjam, Lakhimpur. The processing unit is intended to have a capacity of 100,000 tonnes per annum and produce TMT (thermo mechanically treated) bars from input material sourced from SAIL's integrated steel plants. Completion of the construction is scheduled for 2013.

Lakhimpur is also noted for manufacturing incense, largely as a cottage industry.

== Administration and politics ==
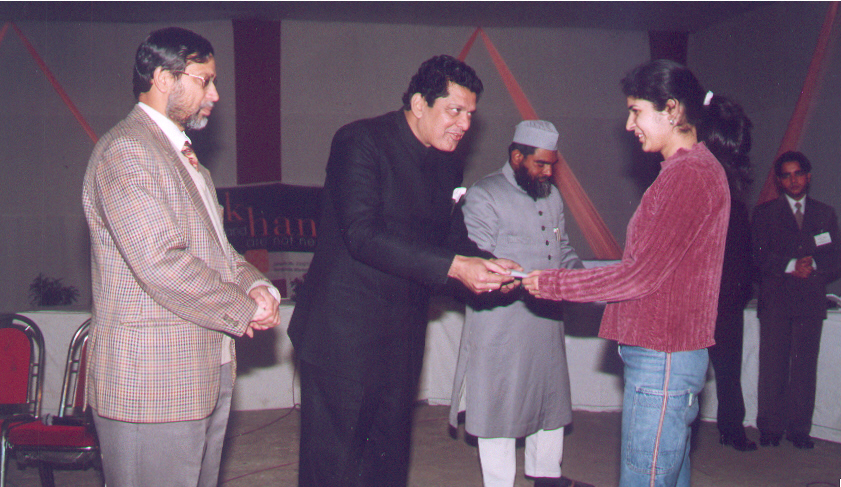
Zafar Ali Naqvi as Chief Guest for the prize distribution ceremony of IT festival – Nerdz 2003, New Delhi

The district comprises -

- 2 Parliamentary Constituencies – Kheri, and Dhaurahra
- 8 Assembly Constituencies – Lakhimpur, Dhaurahara, Gola Gokarannath, Kasta, Mohammadi, Nighasan, Palia Kalan, Srinagar
- 7 Tehsils – Lakhimpur, Mohammdi, Gola Gokarannath, Nighasan, Dhaurahra, Mitauli, Palia Kalan
- 15 blocks – Lakhimpur, Behjam, Mitauli, Pasgawan, Mohammdi, Gola Gokarannath, Bankeyganj, Bijuwa, Paliya, Nighasan, Ramiyabehar, Issanagar, Dhaurahara, Nakaha, Phoolbehar
- 4 Nagar Palikas – Lakhimpur, Gola Gokarannath, Mohammadi, Palia Kalan
- 7 Town Areas – Kheri, Oel, Mailani, Barbar, Singahi, Dhaurahara, Nighasan
- 2 Judicial Court Complexes - District and Sessions Courts at Lakhimpur and Sub-Divisional/Civil Courts at Mohammadi

== Transport ==
Lakhimpur city is 134 kilometres (83 mi) from the state capital Lucknow. It can be easily reached by train (Broad gauge) or UPSRTC Bus services.

=== Air ===
Lakhimpur Kheri Airport known as Palia Airport is situated near Dudhwa National Park at Palia Kalan in Lakhimpur Kheri and is at a distance of 90 kilometres (56 mi) from Lakhimpur City. The nearest international airport is Amausi International Airport in Lucknow and is at a distance of 135 kilometres (84 mi) from the city.

Uttar Pradesh State Highways
UP SH No.	Route	Total length (in Km)
UP SH 21	Bilaraya-Lakhimpur-Sitapur-Panwari Marg	385.46
UP SH 25	Paliya (Lakhimpur)-Lucknow Marg	265.50
UP SH 26	Pilibhit-Lakhimpur-Bahraich-Basti Marg	402.03
UP SH 90	Lakhimpur-Bijua-Palia-Gaurifanta Marg	91.030
UP SH 93	Gola (Lakhimpur)-Shahjanhapur Marg	58.62
NH730	Pilibith to Lakhimpur to Pandrauna	519

=== Bus ===
UPSRTC operates bus station in Lakhimpur, and operates buses to Bareilly, Kaushambi, Anand Vihar Delhi, Gola Gokarannath, Sitapur, Lucknow, Faizabad and Gorakhpur. Shatabdi Buses and Volvo buses are available to Delhi, Rupaidiha and other cities. Online booking can be done at UPSRTC website.

=== Road ===
Lakhimpur Kheri can be reached from Delhi, following Delhi – Muradabad – Bareilly – Shahjahanpur – Gola Gokarannath – Lakhimpur route (Distance: 425 km approx). Lakhimpur can also be reached from state capital Lucknow following Lucknow – Sitapur – Lakhimpur route (Distance: 135 km approx). Several Uttar Pradesh State Highways pass through Lakhimpur.

=== Rail ===
- From Delhi

There are three ways to reach Lakhimpur by Tain:

1. The best way to reach to Lakhimpur kheri from Delhi by train is to reach Sitapur and from Sitapur 1 hour journey by bus. Satyagrah Express runs daily between Delhi and Raxaul, stops at Sitapur railway station.
2. Take the train from Delhi to Shahjahanpur (5–6 hours journey) and from there take a bus/taxi to lakhimpur kheri, 3 hours journey by road.
3. Take the train from Delhi to Lucknow (7–8 hours journey) and from there take a bus/taxi to lakhimpur kheri, 3-3.5 hours journey by road. By Train: Delhi – Muradabad – Bareilly and then Bareilly City – Pilibhit – Mailani – Gola Gokarannath – Lakhimpur

By Train: Delhi – Lucknow and Lucknow – Sitapur – Lakhimpur
By Train: Delhi – Muradabad – Bareilly – Shahjahanpur (NR) and then by road to Lakhimpur (via: Gola Gokarannath) 102 kilometres (63 mi)

==== Rail Gauge Conversion ====
Zafar Ali Naqvi and Jitin Prasada made a promise of getting the meter gauge railway track of the district converted to broad gauge during 2009 Parliamentary elections. Zafar Naqvi raised questions about "Lucknow Pilibhit gauge conversion" on 08-Dec-2011 in the parliament with Ministry of Railway and took this up. Later in the 2010–11 budget survey was proposed by Railway Minister Mamata Banerjee in the Parliament on 24 February 2010; survey was completed as per Railway Budget 2011–12 with a mention that work will be up done in the 12th Plan.

Foundation stone was laid in Kheri on 2 February 2013 for broad gauge conversion of the Aishbagh to Pilibhit via Sitapur and Lakhimpur Kheri track by Adhir Ranjan Chowdhury, the then Minister of State for Railways along with Zafar Naqvi and Jitin Prasad. The centre government in 2013 allocated 927 crore rupees (₹ 9,27,00,00,000) for broad gauge conversion from Aishbagh to Pilibhit. Work on the 262 kilometres (163 mi) long railway track conversion is planned to be completed by 2018. The Railway Development Corporation Limited (RDCL) has been assigned to carry out the broad gauge conversion within the stipulated time frame.

== Culture ==
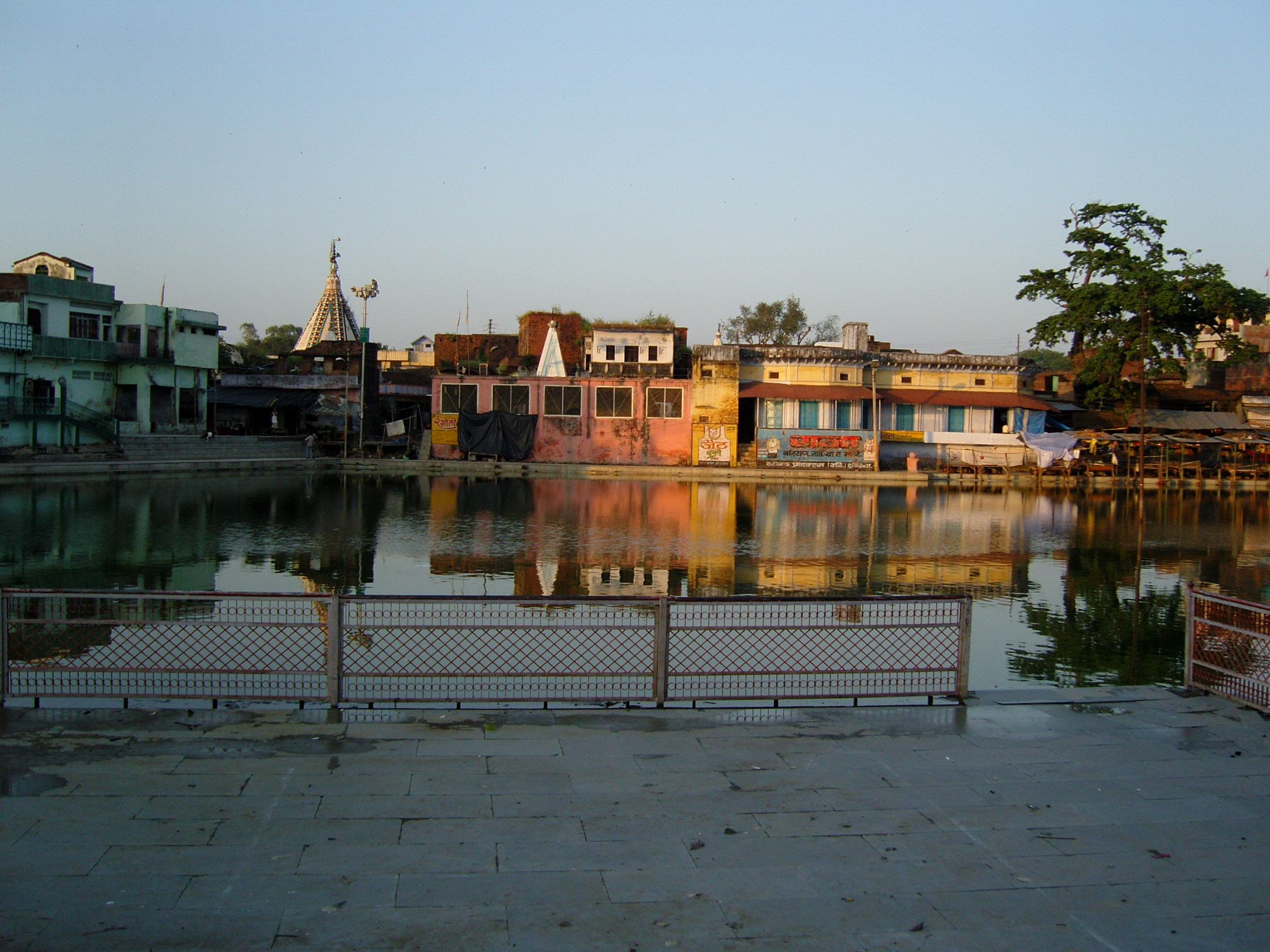
Teerth-Kund at Shiv Temple, Gola Gokarannath

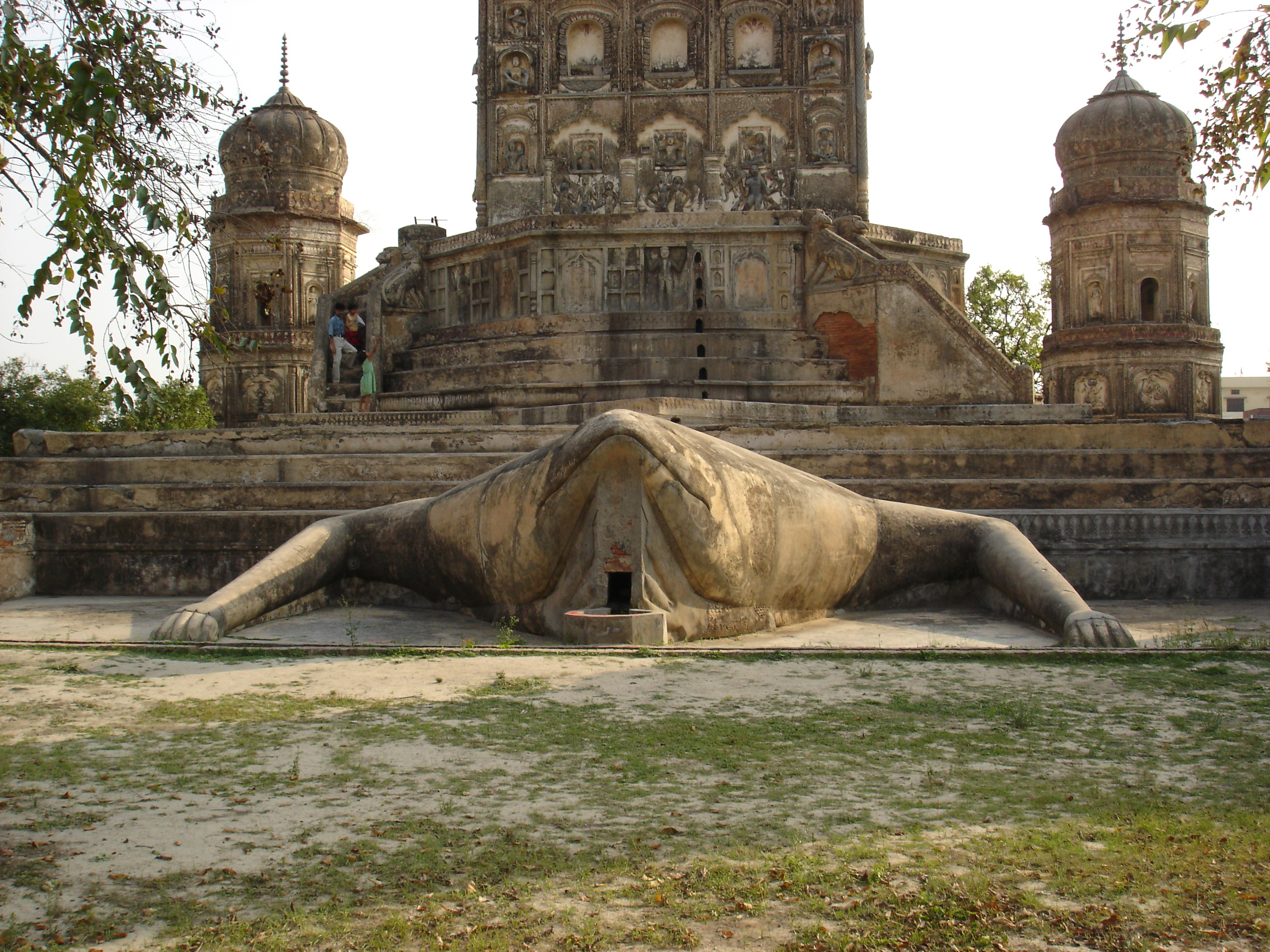
Frog temple

=== Landmarks ===
Temple of Gola Gokaran Nath is a temple dedicated to Lord Shiva.

The unique Frog Temple lies at Oel town, 12 kilometres (7.5 mi) from Lakhimpur on the route from Lakhimpur to Sitapur. It is the only one of its kind in India based on Manduk Tantra. It was built by the former king of Oel State (Lakhimpur Kheri district) between 1860 and 1870. It is dedicated to Lord Shiva. This temple is built at the back of a large frog. The Temple is constructed within an octagonal lotus. The architecture of this temple is based on Tantra Vidya.

Sai Temple (Sikatiha Colony), Sharda Barrage and Deer Park are other major attractions of Lakhimpur.

=== Festivals ===
Several fairs and festivals take place in Lakhimpur. An annual Dussehra and Diwali funfair is organised at Mela Ground and is held over several days. An Eid fair is organised twice annually on the day of Eid in Kheri town.

=== Literature, film and television ===
Lakhimpur has been the setting for films Gaman (1978), Umrao Jaan (1981) and Swades (2004).

=== Notable residents ===
- Aman Singh Gulati
- Billy Arjan Singh conservationist. Honoured with Padma Shri in 1995, world wildlife gold medal in 1976, Order of the Golden Ark a year later and the lifetime award for tiger conservation in March 1999, Padma Bhushan in 2006.
- Zafar Ali Naqvi, former Member of Parliament(2009–2014), Chairman of Standing Committee of National Monitoring Committee for Minorities Education; Former Chairman of Minorities Commission, Delhi; Former Cabinet Minister.
- Jitin Prasada, former Member of Parliament (2009–2014), former Union Minister of State, Petroleum and Natural Gas (India).
- Muzaffar Ali Indian film-maker.
- Shanmughan Manjunath IIM Lucknow graduate and Indian Oil Corporation officer whose murder created a nationwide shock.
- Mangal Dhillon, actor and film producer studied in Nighasan, Lakhimpur.
- Parul Chauhan an Indian television model and Bollywood actress.

== Education ==
According to the 2011 census, Lakhimpur Kheri district had a literacy rate of 60.56% up from 48.39% in 2001, male and female literacy were 69.57% and 50.42% respectively. In the 2001 census, same figures stood at 59.50% and 35.38% in Kheri District. Total literate in the district were 2,034,044 of which male and female were 1,237,157 and 796,887 respectively. The growth of literacy in the last decade of the twentieth century was particularly remarkable with special emphasis on the eradication of illiteracy.

Lakhimpur kheri is having many Schools, Colleges and Institutions here which are contributed a lot in literacy in last two decades. The Schools like Don bosco school, Pt. deen dayal Upadhyay inter college, Soniya International School and some Hindi medium schools like Saraswati Vidya mandir, Arya Kanya inter College and Institute like British Foundation are continuously contributing towards the literacy of the district.

== Health services ==
District Hospital has all the facilities and wards, including the residences of Doctors and Superintendent. Boundaries are shared with the District Jail, Main Road and Jail Road (across which is Women's Hospital). District Women's Hospital is opposite of the District Hospital, and has facilities for gynaecology including pregnancy and neo-natal care.

== Media ==
=== Radio ===
Radio service available in Lakhimpur is FM Rainbow Kheri, it was inaugurated on 14 December 2013 by Zafar Ali Naqvi, Member of Parliament. FM Rainbow Lakhimpur, with the frequency of 102.3, has reach to the audience of around 70 kilometres (43 mi).

=== Communication networks ===
All prominent tele-communication network providers in India offer their services in Lakhimpur. The city of Lakhimpur falls under "Uttar Pradesh Central telecom Circle". Calls from the city of Lakhimpur to neighbouring districts including the rest of the area in the Uttar Pradesh and "Uttarakhand telecom circle" are considered to be local.

GSM, CDMA, 3G and 4G service providers in Lakhimpur include Jio, Airtel, BSNL WLL, CellOne, Idea Cellular(Escotel), Uninor, Reliance India Mobile, Tata Indicom, Vodafone-IN and Reliance Jio

Broadband Services are provided by Airtel, BSNL Fibre and Jio Fibre.

== Sports ==
Lakhimpur's most popular sport is cricket and it has several League cricket clubs. Other sports being actively played include football, hockey, basketball, and badminton. Schools and colleges organise the sports activities, teams play in inter-school and inter-city tournaments.

St. Don Bosco's College alumni's play in an annual Ex-Student's Cricket Tournament, Government Inter College organises an annual G.I.C Cricket Champions Trophy.
