= Lower Sharda Barrage =

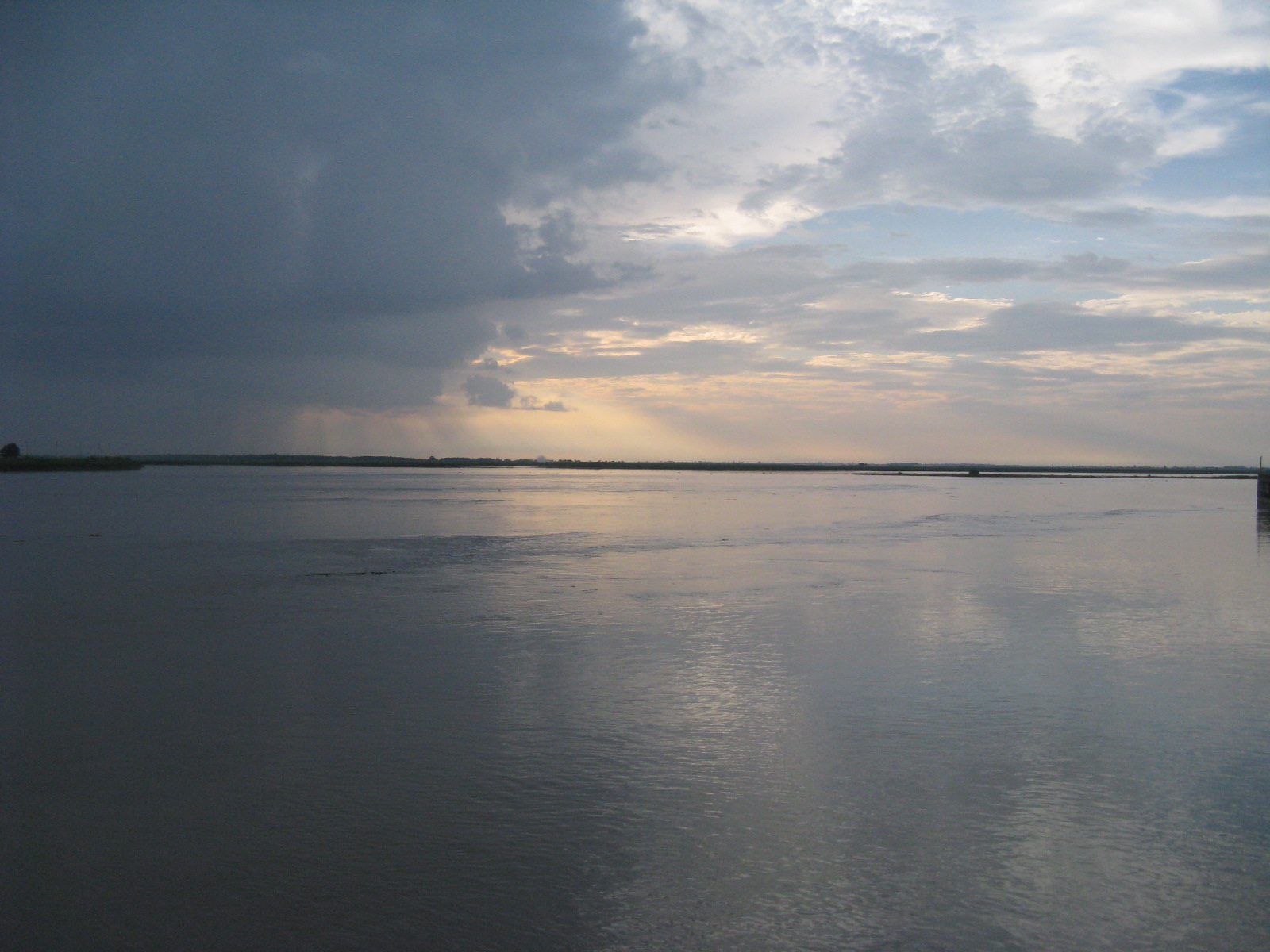
- Sharda River near Lower Sharda Barrage

- Location within India
- Location: Lakhimpur Kheri District, Uttar Pradesh, India
- Coordinates: 28°03′52.49″N 80°57′58.57″E
- Purpose: Irrigation
- Construction began: 1962
- Opening date: 1975

Dam and spillways
- Impounds: Sharda River

The Lower Sharda Barrage, is a dam nearly 28 km from Lakhimpur city in Uttar Pradesh, India.

== Construction ==
The Lower Sharda Barrage is constructed on the Sharda River, about 163.5 km downstream of the Upper Sharda Barrage.

This project is part of the Sharda Sahayak Pariyojana and primarily depends on water diverted from the Karnali (Ghaghra) at Girjapur through the Sharda Sahayak link canal of 28.4 km length for over eight months in the year during the lean season; but it indents on Sharda supplies during the monsoon between July and October when the Karnali carries a lot of silt. It was constructed in the leadership of Ragveersharan Agarwal.

== Economy ==
The Sharda Sahayak Pariyojana aims at irrigating culturable command area of 16,770 km^{2} with 70 per cent irrigation intensity. The 258.80 km long feeder channel takes off from the right bank of Lower Sharda Barrage with discharge of 650 m^{3}/s. Supplies are then fed into the different branches of the Sharda canal system, namely, the Dariyabad branch, the Barabanki branch, the Haidergarh branch, the bareilly branch and the Purva branch.

Sharda Sahayak Pariyojana provides protective canal irrigation for cultivable area of 2 m ha to lakhs of farmers in 150 development blocks of 16 districts in eastern Uttar Pradesh. The project was commissioned in 1962, and completed in 1975 with an estimated cost of Rs. 1,300 crore.

== See also ==
- Headworks
- Tide
