= Yash Gulati =

Indian orthopaedic surgeon

- Born: 17 February; India
- Occupation: Orthopedic surgeon
- Known for: Joint Replacement and spine surgery
- Spouse: Renu Gulati
- Children: 2 Sukrit; Nitya Gulati Saini
- Parent(s): J D Gulati and Padma Gulati
- Awards: Padma Shri ( Fourth Highest National Civilian Award ) Dr BC Roy National Award. Honorary Surgeon to The President Of India IMA Distinguished Service Award Chiktask Ratna Award

Yash Gulati is an Indian orthopedic surgeon and the senior consultant orthopaedic surgeon at Indraprastha Apollo Hospitals, New Delhi. He specializes in joint replacement and spine surgeries and is a visiting consultant at RAK Hospital, Ras al-Khaimah. He is the youngest orthopedic surgeon to win the civilian honour of the Padma Shri.

== Biography ==
A medical graduate of the Maulana Azad Medical College, University of Delhi, Gulati passed the degree with distinction in Preventive and Social Medicine, after which secured his MS in orthopedics from the same institution. He went on to obtain MCh in orthopedics from the University of Liverpool and completed an advanced diploma in sports medicine from the Royal College of Surgeons in Ireland, Dublin. After working at St. James's Hospital, Dublin, as a consultant orthopaedic surgeon, Ram Manohar Lohia Hospital, New Delhi, as the head of the orthopedic unit, BLK Super Speciality Hospital, New Delhi, as the Director and Head of the Department of Orthopaedics and Batra Hospital and Medical Research Centre, New Delhi as the Senior Consultant, Orthopaedics, he joined the Indraprastha Apollo Hospital in 1996 where he is the senior consultant in Orthopedics. He is known for successfully performing several hip and knee replacement surgeries as well as micro discectomies and has operated on celebrities such as. Former Prime Minister of India, VVIPs, Diplomats, International Sportspersons like Anil Kumble, among others.

Gulati has delivered orations and keynote addresses in India and abroad and has performed live total knee replacement and total hip replacement surgeries in many places including the one at the Golden Jubilee Orthopaedic Conference in Indonesia. He has served as the honorary surgeon to Indian Armed Forces and the Border Security Force. He is a recipient of the IMA Distinguished Service Award, Romesh Chander Best Doctor Award, and Chiktask Ratna Award and his surgical performance has been shown on Trevor McDonald’s Programme on ITV London. The Government of India awarded him the fourth highest civilian honour of the Padma Shri, in 2009, for his contributions to Medicine, making him the youngest orthopedic surgeon to receive the award.

== See also ==
- Total knee replacement
- Total hip replacement
