= Michael Lauer =

American physician

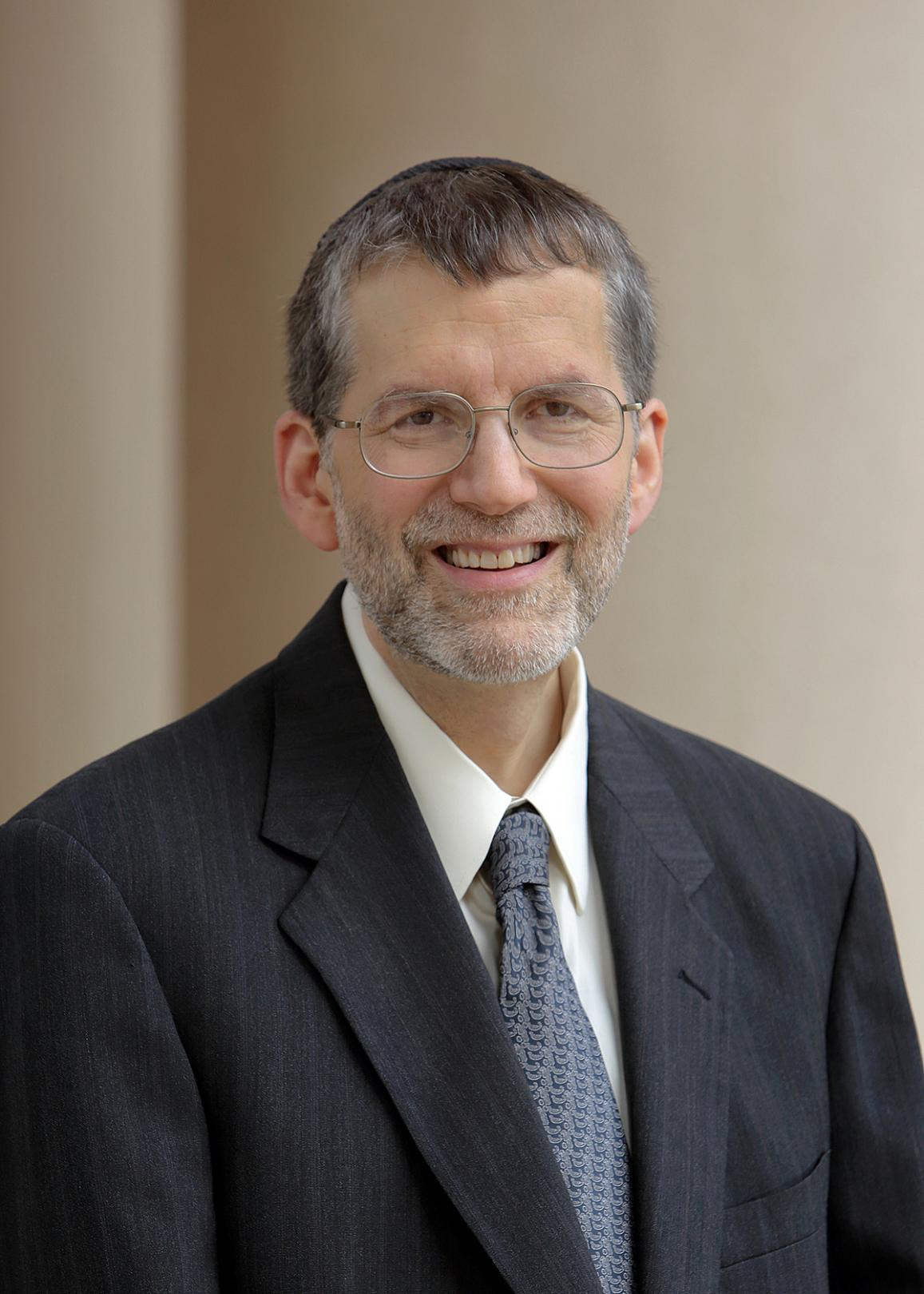
- Lauer in 2015
- Education: Rensselaer Polytechnic Institute; Albany Medical College
- Awards: Arthur S. Flemming Award
- Scientific career
- Fields: Cardiology
- Workplaces: Cleveland Clinic; National Institutes of Health

Michael S. Lauer is an American cardiologist and physician-scientist. He was the deputy director for extramural research at the National Institutes of Health (NIH).

== Education ==
Lauer received education and training at Rensselaer Polytechnic Institute, Albany Medical College, Harvard Medical School, Harvard School of Public Health, and the National Heart, Lung, and Blood Institute (NHLBI) Framingham Heart Study.

== Career ==
Lauer spent 14 years at Cleveland Clinic as professor of medicine, epidemiology, and biostatistics. During his tenure at the Clinic, he led a federally funded clinical epidemiology program that applied big data from large-scale electronic health platforms to questions regarding the diagnosis and management of cardiovascular disease. From 2007 to 2015 he served as a division director at the National Heart, Lung, and Blood Institute (NHLBI), where promoted efforts to leverage big data infrastructure to enable high-efficiency population and clinical research and efforts to adopt a research funding culture that reflected data-driven policy.

Lauer was the deputy director for extramural research at the National Institutes of Health (NIH).

== Awards and honors ==
Lauer won an Arthur S. Flemming Award for exceptional federal service in recognition of his efforts to grow a culture of learning and accountability.
