= Sharda River =

River along the India–Nepal border

Sharda River Mahakali River
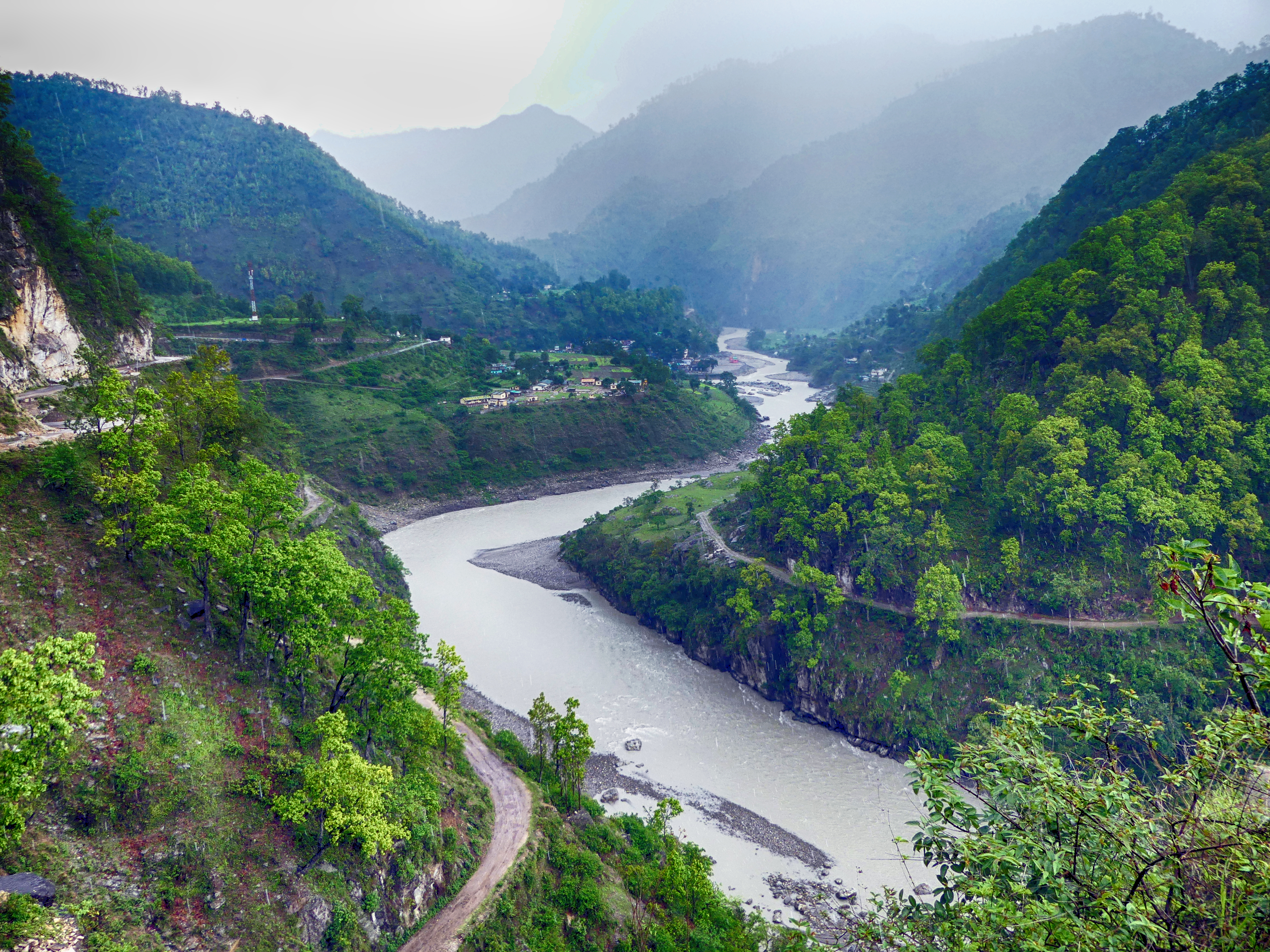
- Sharda River near Jauljibi in Uttarakhand

- Location within Uttar Pradesh Location within India Location within Nepal
- Native name: महाकाली नदी (Nepali); शारदा नदी (Hindi)

Location
- Countries: India and Nepal
- Region: Uttarakhand and Uttar Pradesh in India; Sudurpashchim Province in Nepal

Physical characteristics
- Source
  - location: Pithoragarh district, Uttarakhand
  - coordinates: 30.2421°N 81.0219°E
  - elevation: 3,600 m (11,800 ft)
- 2nd source
  - location: South of Lipulekh Pass, Nepal–Tibet border
  - coordinates: 30.4384°N 80.5706°E
  - elevation: 5,553 m (18,219 ft)
- Mouth
  - location: Ghaghra River, Uttar Pradesh, India
  - coordinates: 27.6408°N 81.2905°E
  - elevation: 115 m (377 ft)
- Length: 350 km (220 mi)
- Basin size: 14,871 km^{2} (5,742 sq mi)
- Discharge
  - average: 730 m^{3}/s (26,000 cu ft/s); March: 150 m^{3}/s (5,300 cu ft/s); July: 1,580 m^{3}/s (56,000 cu ft/s)

Basin features
- River system: Ganges
- Tributaries
  - left: Chameliya, Ramgun in Nepal
  - right: Kuthi, Dhauli, Gori, Sarju, Ladhiya rivers in Uttarakhand

The Sharda River is the downstream of Kāli River (or Mahakali River) that originates in the northern Uttarakhand state of India in the Great Himalayas on the eastern slopes of Nanda Devi massif, at an elevation of 3,600 m (11,800 ft) in the Pithoragarh district. It then flows on the Nepal and India border. Descending, it enters the Indo-Gangetic Plain at Brahmadev Mandi in Nepal, where it expands above the Sharda Barrage. From that point onward, it is known as the Sharda River. The river proceeds southeastward into India through northern Uttar Pradesh before merging with the Ghaghara River southwest of Bahraich, covering a distance of approximately 300 miles (480 km).

It offers potential for hydroelectric power generation. The river is also proposed as source for one of the many projects in the Himalayan component of the Indian Rivers Inter-link project.

== Hydrology ==
=== Sources ===
Sharda River headwaters

The sources of the Sharda river have seen much debate through history. The tradition believes that the river originates from a collection of springs near the Kalapani village. The Almora District Gazetteer states:

A remarkable collection of springs regarded as sacred by the Indians and erroneously considered by them as the source of the Kali river, though the headwaters of the latter lie 30 miles further north-west. The springs are in fact unimportant tributaries.

In the British definition of 1911, the Sharda River is formed by the union of two headwaters: the Kalapani River that originates below the Lipulekh Pass and the Kuthi Yankti river that rises below the Limpiyadhura range, but both streams have been termed "Kali River" on different occasions.

The Sharda River serves as the boundary between Uttarakhand's Kumaon Division and Nepal from "a little below the Kalapani encamping ground" (30.217°N 80.904°E). The Lipulekh Pass as well as the Limpayadhura pass (or Limpiya pass) are on Uttarakhand's border with Tibet.

=== Course ===
The Sharda River receives from the right, the Darma River at Tawaghat (29°57′N 80°36′E). It passes Dharchula and receives Gori Ganga at Jauljibi, after which it exists the high mountains that reach into the alpine zone. At 29°36′N 80°24′E the first important left-bank (L) tributary from Nepal, the Chameliya joins after flowing southwest from Nepal's Gurans Himal (including Api). A bazaar town Jhulaghat (29°34′N 80°21′E) is on both sides of the river. Then the Kali receives the Sarju River (R) at 29°27′N 80°15′E. The area around Pancheshwar is called Kali Kumaon.

The Sharda River exits the Hill Region at Jogbudha Valley and receives two tributaries: Ladhiya (R) at 29°12′N 80°14′E and Ramgun (L) at 29°9′N 80°16′E. Then it enters the lower Shivalik Hills. Tanakpur (R) town is just above the dam of Sharda Sagar Reservoir at 29°3′N 80°7′E. Here water is diverted into an irrigation canal. Finally, the river exits the last hills into the Terai plains, passing the towns Banbasa (R) and Mahendranagar (Bhim Datta) (L). It flows southeast for another 100 km (62 mi) in Uttar Pradesh to join the Ghaghara River as a right-bank tributary at 27°39′N 81°17′E, some 30 km. NNW of Bahraich.

=== Basin ===
Mahakali is one of the five major river basins of Nepal which is shared with India and has a total basin area of 14,871 km (9,240 mi). up to Upper Sharda Barrage, about 34 per cent of which lies in Nepal. The total catchment area is 17,818 km up to Lower Sharda Barrage.

== Development and resource utilisation ==
=== Mahakali Treaty ===
As per a submission by the DDP Secretariat of the United Nations Environment Programme (UNEP) on Dams and Development Project, on the Mahakali Treaty it is stated that "the Treaty emphasizes an integrated approach to the development of water resources and, more importantly, attempts to validate past activities taken to develop water resources on the Mahakali River." UNEP has in conclusion observed that "the signing of the Mahakali Treaty has indeed provided India and Nepal with an opportunity for meaningful cooperation to benefit the millions of people in the two countries whose livelihood depends on the waters of the Mahakali River."

=== Dams ===
The Pancheshwar Dam, a joint venture of India and Nepal for irrigation and hydro-electric power generation was proposed on this river in 1995, named as Sarayu or Kali River. However, Nepal and India have been unable to reach a decision on the 5,600-MW Pancheshwar multipurpose dam project, in part because of political changes both in Nepal and India. The project became a priority again in 2013, and negotiations restarted.

=== Irrigation ===
==== Lower Sharda Barrage ====
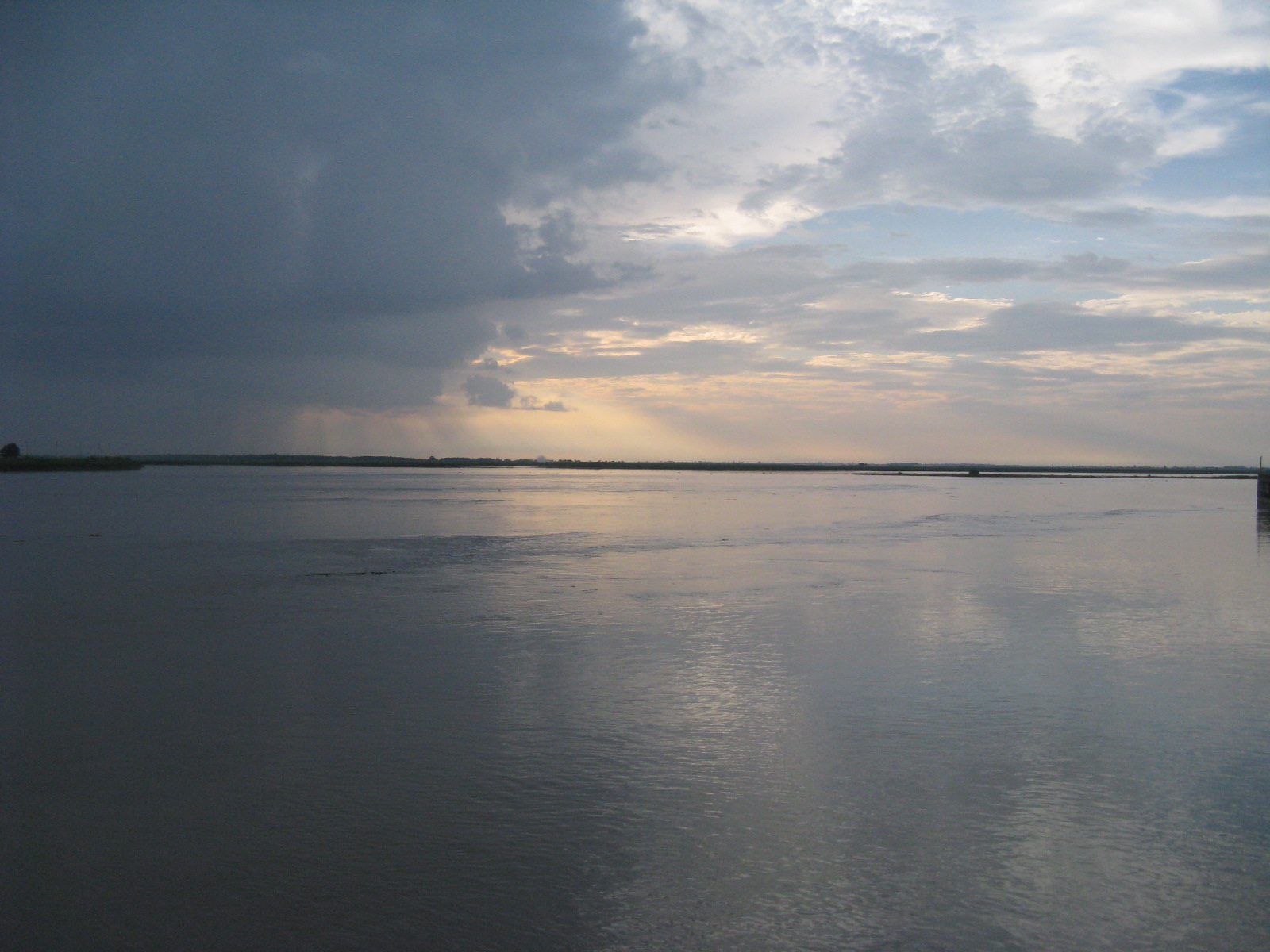
Sharda River near Lower Sharda Barrage, Lakhimpur Kheri

The lower Sharda Barrage is constructed on the Sharda River, about 163.5 km (101.6 mi) downstream of the Upper Sharda Barrage and nearly 28 km (17 mi) from Lakhimpur city. This project is part of the Sharda Sahayak Pariyojana. The project aims at irrigating culturable command area of 16,770 km^{2} (6,470 sq mi) with 70% irrigation intensity; the 258.80 km (160.81 mi) long feeder channel starts at the right bank of Sharda Barrage with a discharge of 650 m^{3}/s (23,000 cu ft/s).

=== Hydropower ===
In Nepal, Karnali and Mahakali rivers together have hydropower potential of 36,180 MW (economically exploitable is 25,000 MW) out of a total potential of 83,000 MW.

In the Indian state of Uttarakhand, which adjoins the Sharda (Mahakali river), the power generation envisaged is likely to be 6400 MW at 60% load factor (about 24,000 MW at 16% load factor) out of which 2400 MW (9000 MW at 16% load factor) is from the right bank tributaries of the Sharda (Mahakali), excluding the Pancheshwar Multipurpose Project.

Some of the projects built/under construction/planned are as under.

==== Tanakpur Barrage and Hydroelectric Project ====
Tanakpur HEP is a run of the river scheme on the Sharda River (Mahakali River in Nepal) located near the town of Tanakpur in the district of Champawat. It has a Barrage across the Sharda River for diverting river flows into a 6.2 km (3.9 mi) long power channel of 566 m^{3}/s capacity for utilisation of 24 m head available between the Barrage at Tanakpur and the existing Sharda canal i.e. 0.6 km (0.37 mi) downstream of Banbasa Barrage. The power station with three units of 40 MW (3x40 MW=120 MW) is located near the existing Banbasa Barrage. The tail race channel joins directly the Sharda River. The project is designed to produce 460 million units of power on 90% availability. The construction of the Barrage was started in 1988. In the spirit of furthering co-operation within the Mahakali River area, the Governments of India and Nepal entered into a memorandum of understanding, commonly referred to as the Tanakpur Agreement, on 6 December 1991. The Agreement provided for the construction of the left afflux bund on Nepalese territory for which the Nepalese provided 2.9 ha (7.2 acres) of land to construct the left afflux bund of 577 m (1,893 ft) in length. As a quid pro quo, the Agreement provided for the installation of a head regulator, the main part of the reservoir regulating the water flow, at the Tanakpur Barrage with a capacity of 1,000 cu ft/s (28 m^{3}/s), and required India to construct a canal to deliver 150 cu ft/s (4.2 m^{3}/s) of water to Nepal. India was also required to provide 10 million kWh of energy to Nepal free of charge. The Tanakpur Project was commissioned in April 1993. But the seething discontent entrenched for nearly five years in Nepal on benefits agreed to be provided by India to Nepal under the agreement of 1991 continued till the Mahakali Treaty between the two countries for the integrated development of water resources on the Mahakali River was signed on 12 February 1996. The Mahakali Treaty has subsumed the regime established by the Sharda Treaty, has validated the controversial Tanakpur Agreement, and endorsed the idea of a new multipurpose project – The Pancheshwar Multipurpose Project (PMP) – the details of which, are being worked out. As per the Treaty, Nepal is now entitled to an annual supply of 70 million kWh of energy from Tanakpur HEP on a continuous basis, free of cost, from the effective date of the Mahakali Treaty. For this purpose, India also agreed to construct a 132 kV transmission line all the way to the Indo-Nepalese border from the Tanakpur Power Station. There is provision for the supply of 350 cu ft/s (9.9 m^{3}/s) of water for the irrigation of Dodhara Chandni area. India has also agreed to construct a road linking Tanakpur to Nepal's East–West highway.

==== Pancheshwar Multipurpose Project (PMP) & Purnagiri Re-regulating Dam (Indo–Nepal) ====
In compliance of the Treaty provisions mentioned above, the scope of Pancheshwar Multipurpose Project (PMP) is being actively discussed and defined by Nepal and India to enable finalisation of the Detailed Project Report. The proposed project, which straddles the border that lies along the median point of the river, envisages a 293 m high rock fill dam (to be the largest rock fill dam in the world), just downstream of the confluence of the Mahakali and Sarju river, having a live storage capacity of 9.24 BCM and a dead storage capacity of 2.15 BCM. In the project area, the river forms the border between India and Nepal, dividing the Sudurpashchim Province province of Nepal from the Uttarakhand State in India. The PMP also envisages a re-regulating dam for which two alternatives at Purnagiri (1020 MW) and Rupaligad (500 MW) have been considered, to hold the waters passing through the turbines and provide regulated back season release to irrigate designated commands in Nepal and India. Two power stations are projected, one on either bank, with an overall installed peaking capacity, between 5,500 and 6,480 MW at 20 per cent load factor. As per the Treaty principles both sides are committed to design and operate the project as a single, integrated scheme to yield, "the maximum total net benefits accruing to them". The power benefit is to be assessed on the basis of saving in costs as compared with the relevant alternatives available. As per the Treaty "equal entitlement in the utilisation of the waters of the Mahakali River "without prejudice to their respective existing consumptive uses" is also planned to be ensured from the PMP.

==== Chameliya Hydroelectric Project ====
Chameliya Hydroelectric Project, in Nepal (in the Far Western Development Region), a daily peaking run-off-river (PROR) scheme with an installed capacity of 30 MW, has been taken up for construction during January 2007. The Project lies about 950 km west of Kathmandu on Chameliya river, a tributary of Mahakali river in Darchula district. The Main features of the Project are 54 m high concrete dam, 4.06 km long headrace tunnel, surge tank, penstocks and semi- underground powerhouse with two units of each 15.3 MW vertical shaft Francis turbines. The generated power from the Project will be evacuated through 131 km long 132 kV transmission line, connecting Attariya Substation at Kailali district.

== Tourism ==
=== National parks in the basin ===
Kali River from Annapurna Mountain Purnagiri Temple, Tanakpur, Uttarakhand, Nepal Border, Champavat District

Notable national parks are Shuklaphanta National Park in Nepal and Dudhwa National Park in India. Shuklaphanta National Park was established in 1976 as a wildlife reserve and covers an area of 305 km^{2} (118 sq mi) in Kanchanpur District, Far-Western Region, Nepal. The protected area supports a wide range of nationally and globally important biodiversity, including 46 mammal species. It has a common boundary with the Indian state of Uttar Pradesh in the south and west which is formed by the Mahakali River, and is bordered on the east by the Chaudhar River and in the north by a forest belt and cultivations. The prevalent vegetation is grassland. Forest stands comprise sal, khair and sissoo. This protected area hosts the worldwide largest herd of swamp deer, and 423 bird species including the largest population of Bengal florican. Gharials have been reintroduced to the park and its rivers.

Dudhwa National Park is located in Uttar Pradesh, India. The northern edge of the park lies along the India-Nepal border, and the southern boundary is formed by the Suheli River. The terrain of the park varies from mosaic grasslands, dense sal forests and swampy marshes. It has diverse wildlife population. In 1987 Dudhwa National Park and Kishanpur Wildlife Sanctuary were merged to form Dudhwa Tiger Reserve. Although the tigers at the park are numerous, sightings are rare due to the thick forest cover of the area. Besides tigers, leopards, hispid hares, swamp deer and Indian rhinoceros, it harbours 400 species of resident and migratory birds, 37 species of mammals and 16 species of reptiles.

=== Water rafting in Kumaon region of Uttarakhand ===
As the river flows down from the Nepal border through Kumaon hills and as the Kali and Gori Rivers meet at Jauljibi, with increased water volume, it offers a river rafting adventure to professionals, for a length of 117 km, from Jauljibi to Tanakpur. In rafting parlance, in this stretch, the rapids in the river are of Grade IV and more, which could be covered in 3 days. Below Tanakpur, Lower down among the frosted slopes, the river becomes calmer offering the amateur a sporting challenge.

=== Places of religious interest ===
Both sides of the Mahakali valley, the Indian and the Nepali, are rich in sacred natural sites. These include certain bugyals (high-altitude pastures) that are considered sacred, sacred forests and water bodies, and sacred mountains. Some famous sacred mountains in this region include Adi Kailash, Om Parvat, and Gwalek Kedar.

In the Kumaon region of Uttarakhand in India every peak, lake or mountain range is somehow or the other connected with some myth or the name of a God or Goddess, ranging from those associated with the Shaiva, Shakta and Vaishnava traditions, to local Gods like Haim, Saim, Golu, Nanda, Sunanda, Chhurmal, Kail Bisht, Bholanath, Gangnath, Airi and Chaumu. Referring to the rich religious myths and lores associated with Uttarakhand, E. T. Atkinson has said: 'To the beliefs of the great majority of Hindus, the Kumaon (Himalaya) is what Palestine is to the Christians.'

In Kumaon, famous temples are the Kali temple at Kalapani, Shiva temple of Singhphal in Dudhwa reserve, the Baleshwar temple (in South Indian architectural style) at Champawat , an Indian National Heritage Monument of Archaeological Survey of India (ASI) since 1952, and Nagnath temple in Champawat

== Issues ==
=== Human and fish conflict ===
The river attracted media attention in 2007, over the Kali river goonch attacks that cost three lives, probably by an exceptionally large catfish of the Bagarius yarrelli species. Efforts to capture the offending fish were shown in episodes of a documentary television program River Monsters.

== See also ==
- Indo-Gangetic Plain
