= Ghaghara =

Asian river and tributary of the Ganges

Ghaghara Karnali Saryu Mapcha Tsangpo
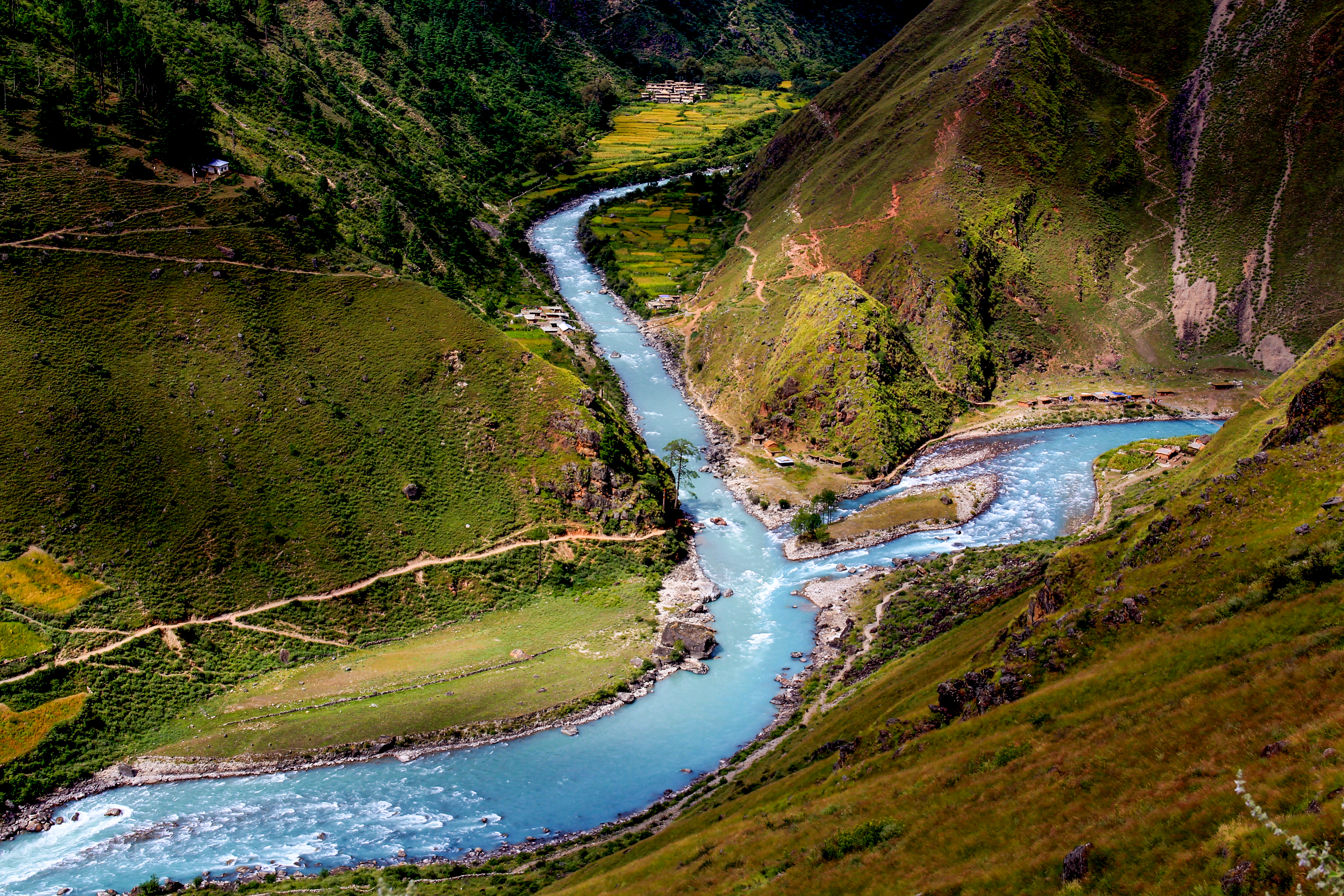
- Karnali (Ghaghara) river in Nepal

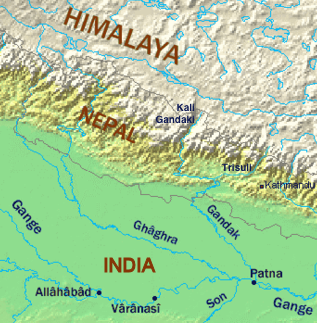
- Map showing the Ghaghara and Gandaki tributaries of the Ganges

Location
- Country: Tibet, Nepal, India

Physical characteristics
- Source: Mapchachungo Glacier
  - location: Tibet
  - elevation: 3,962 m (12,999 ft)
- Mouth: Ganges
  - location: Revelganj, Bihar, India
  - coordinates: 25°45′11″N 84°39′59″E
- Length: 1,080 km (670 mi)
- Basin size: 127,950 km^{2} (49,400 sq mi)
- Discharge
  - average: 2,990 m^{3}/s (106,000 cu ft/s)
- Discharge
  - location: Nepal
  - average: 1,369 m^{3}/s (48,300 cu ft/s)

Basin features
- Tributaries
  - left: Bheri, Kuwana, Rapti, Chhoti Gandak
  - right: Seti, Dahawar, Sarda, Budhi Ganga

The Ghaghara River, called Karnali River in Nepal, Mapcha Tsangpo in Tibet, and Saryu River in India's Awadh, is a perennial trans-boundary river that originates in the northern slopes of the Himalayas in the Tibetan Plateau, cuts through the Himalayas in Nepal and joins the Sharda River at Brahmaghat in India. Together they form the Ghaghara River, a major left-bank tributary of the Ganges. With a length of 507 km (315 mi), it is the longest river in Nepal. The total length of the Ghaghara up to its confluence with the Ganges at Revelganj in Bihar is 1,080 km (670 mi). It is the largest tributary of the Ganges by volume and the second largest by length after Yamuna.

== Course ==
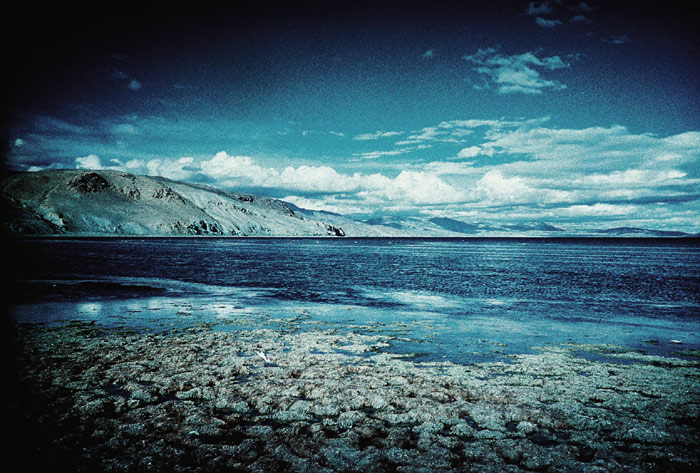
Source of Karnali River

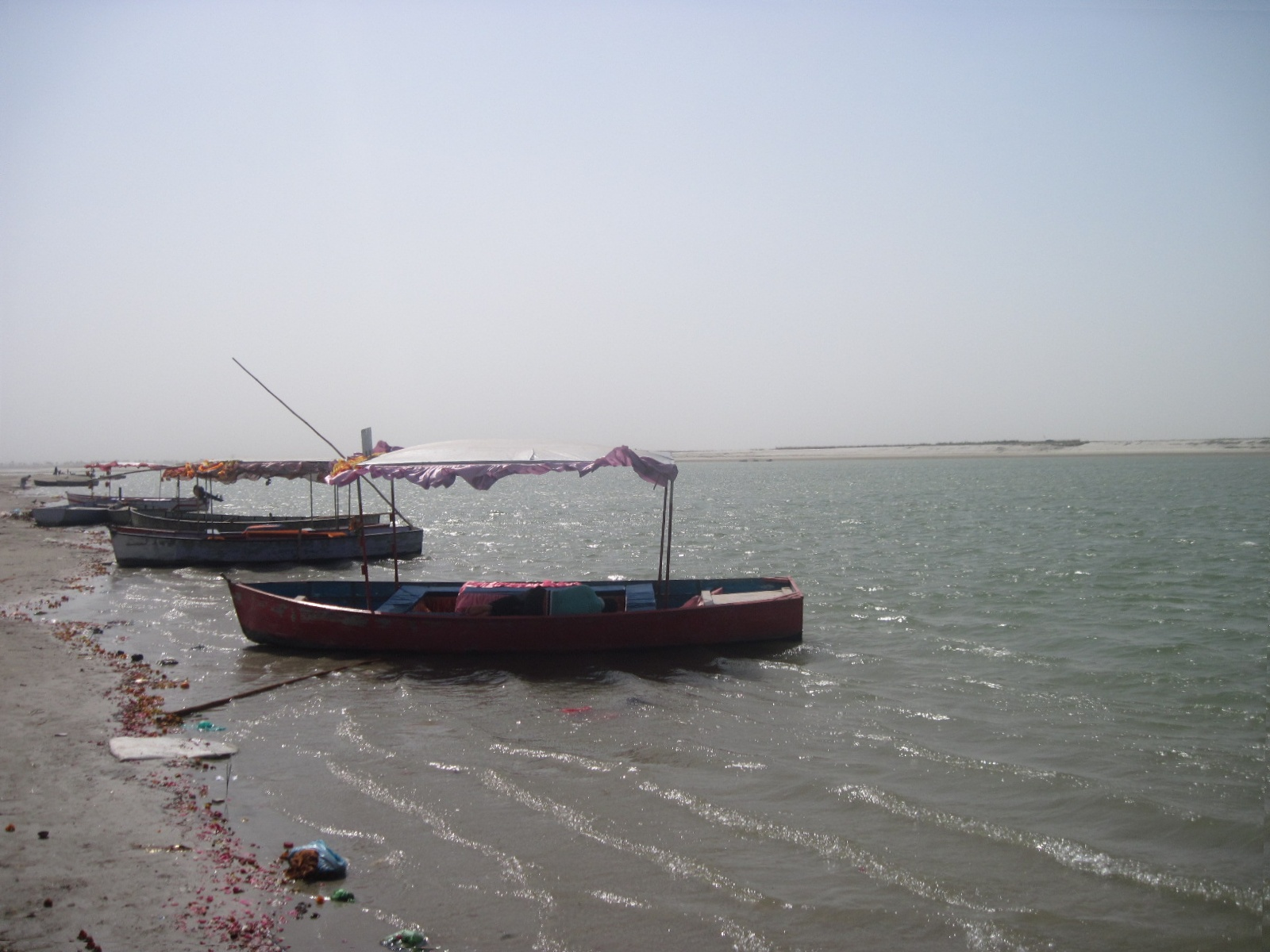
Ghaghara River in Ayodhya is also known as Saryu river

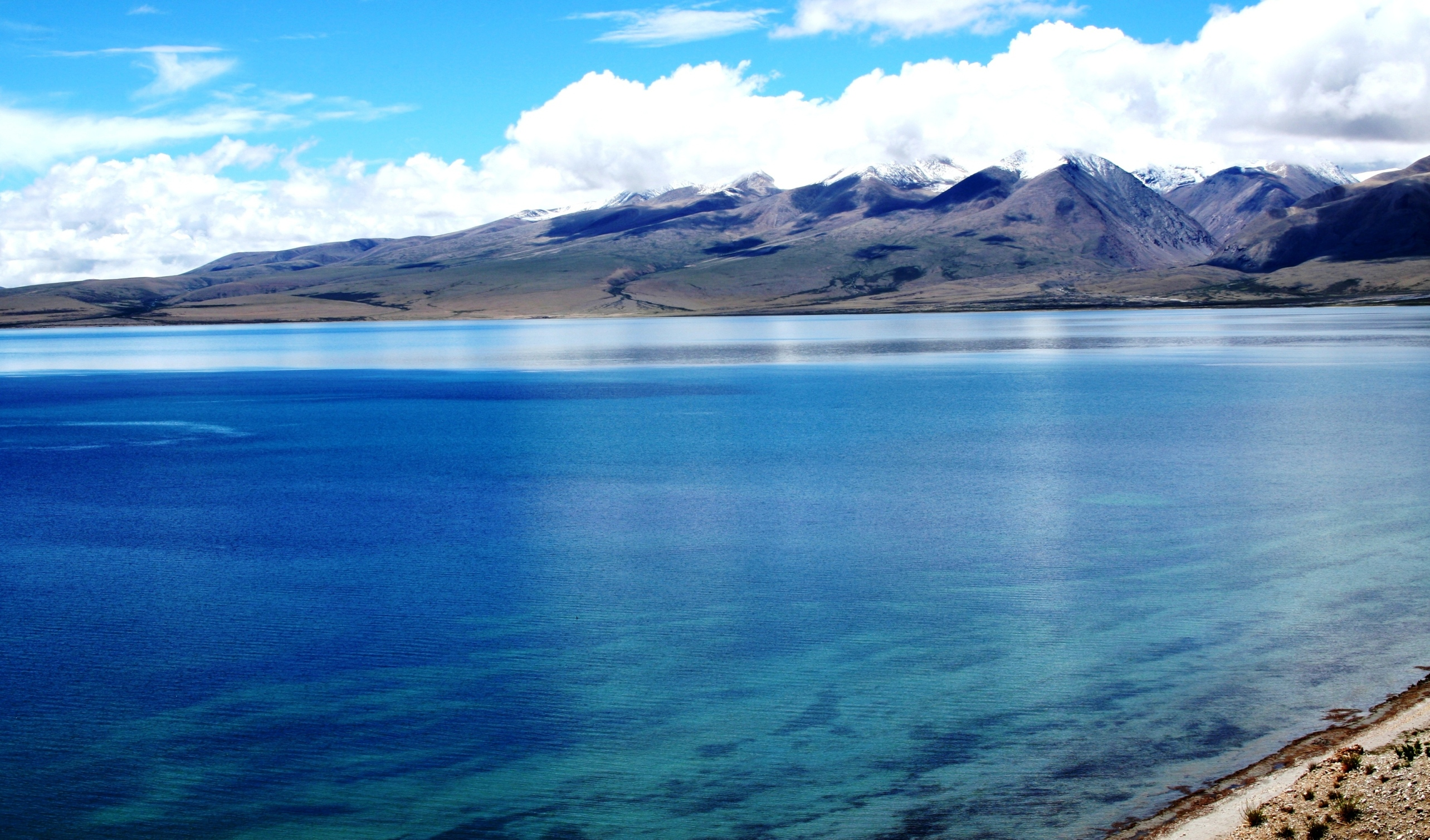
Lake Manasarovar in Tibet near the source of the Karnali River

The Karnali rises in the northern slopes of the Himalayas in Tibet, in the glaciers of Mapchachungo, at an elevation of about 3,962 metres (12,999 ft) above sea level. The river flows south through one of the most remote and least explored areas of Nepal as the Karnali River. The 202-kilometre (126 mi) Seti River drains the western part of the catchment and joins the Karnali in Doti District north of Dundras hill. Another tributary, the 264-kilometre (164 mi) long Bheri, rises in the western part of Dhaulagiri Himalaya and drains the eastern part of the catchment, meeting the Karnali near Kuineghat in Surkhet.

Cutting southward across the Sivalik Hills, it splits into two branches, the Geruwa on the left and Kauriala river on the right near Chisapani to rejoin south of the Indian border and form the proper Ghaghara. Other tributaries originating in Nepal are the West Rapti, the Kali (or Mahakali) and the little Gandak. It flows southeast through Uttar Pradesh and Bihar states to join the Ganges downstream of the town of Chhapra, after a course of 1,080 kilometres (670 mi). Saryu river is said to be synonymous with the modern Karnali river or as a tributary of it.

Karnali River exposes the oldest part of the Sivalik Hills of Nepal. The remnant magnetization of siltstones and sandstones in this group suggests a depositional age of between 16 million and 5.2 million years.

== Basin ==
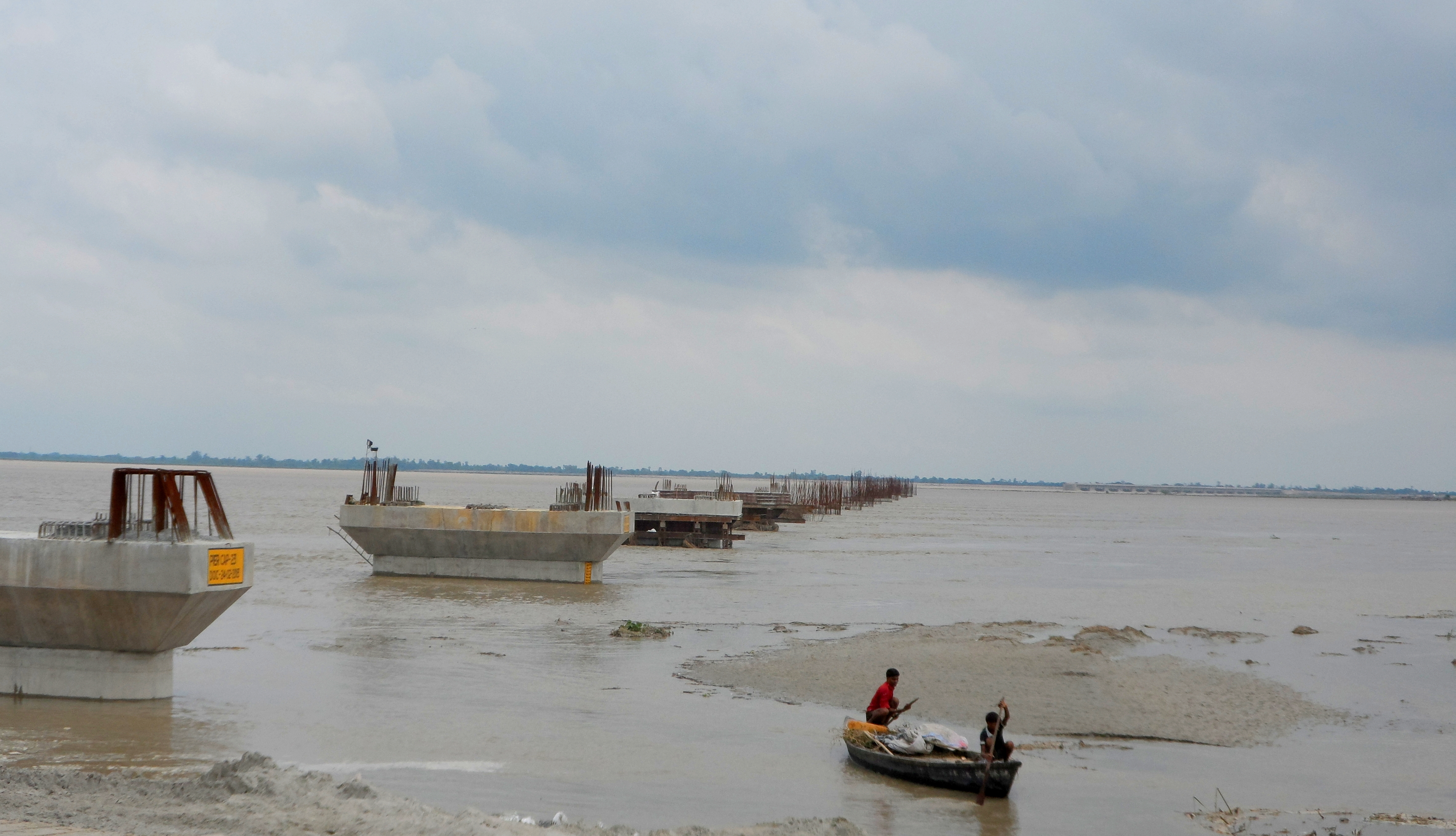
Ghaghra river in Sitapur

The Karnali River Basin lies between the mountain ranges of Dhaulagiri in Nepal and Nanda Devi in Uttarakhand. Dhaulagiri II, elevation 7,751 metres (25,430 ft), is the highest point of the entire basin. In the north, it lies in the rain shadow of the Himalayas. The basin formed by the river has a total catchment area of 127,950 square kilometres (49,400 mi^{2}), of which 45 percent is in India.

=== Tributaries ===
Chhoti Gandak is a groundwater-fed meandering river originating near Dhesopool, Maharajganj district of Uttar Pradesh. It travels a distance of about 250 kilometres (160 mi) and joins Ghaghara near Guthani, Siwan district of Bihar. The Chhoti Gandak River Basin is located between 26°00' to 27°20' N latitude and 83°30' to 84°15' E longitude. Right bank tributaries are Khekhra, Hirna, Jethan, Maun, Duhari, Kanchi and Koilar rivers; Khanua river joins from the left bank. The discharge of Chhoti Gandak is mainly controlled by rain, which is very high during the monsoon season and low during the summers. It has been observed that whenever precipitation is high in the catchment areas, there is flood in the downstream part of the Chhoti Gandak River Basin. The region exhibits upland terrace surface, river valley terrace surface, present-day river channel with narrow flood plains, natural levee, and point-bar deposits. All these geomorphic features are depositional in nature and made up of alluvium of different ages.

The main tributaries of the Karnali are Seti and Bheri.

== Administrative zones and districts ==
In Nepal, the Karnali Province is the largest zone with about 5,000 square miles (13,000 km^{2}) area. Its administrative center is Jumla. The zone is divided into the five districts of Dolpa, Humla, Jumla, Kalikot and Mugu.

The Karnali Province has the lowest population density in Nepal. There are no large settlements on the banks of the river, which is only crossed near Chisapani by the Mahendra Highway. This region is now connected by karnali highway and now due to various hydro electricity projects this area is being developed. Now a 900 MW project is going to be constructed in this river

In India, the administrative districts in the Ghaghra catchment are Ambedkar Nagar, Ayodhya, Gonda, Azamgarh, Barabanki, Basti, Ballia, Bahraich, Deoria, Gonda, Gorakhpur, Sant Kabir Nagar, Lakhimpur Kheri, Mau, Sitapur of Uttar Pradesh and Siwan district in Bihar.

Important towns in India include Akabarpur, Ayodhya, Bahraich, Barabanki, Basti, Deoria, Barhalganj, Gonda, Gorakhpur, Sitapur, Siddharthnagar, Saint Kabir Nagar, Kamhariya, Rajesultanpur, Tanda and Mihinpurwa[Bahraich] in Uttar Pradesh and Chapra, Siwan, and Sonepur in Bihar.

The Ghaghra River is locally known as "Saryu" or "Sarayu" in the city of Ayodhya.

== Protected areas ==
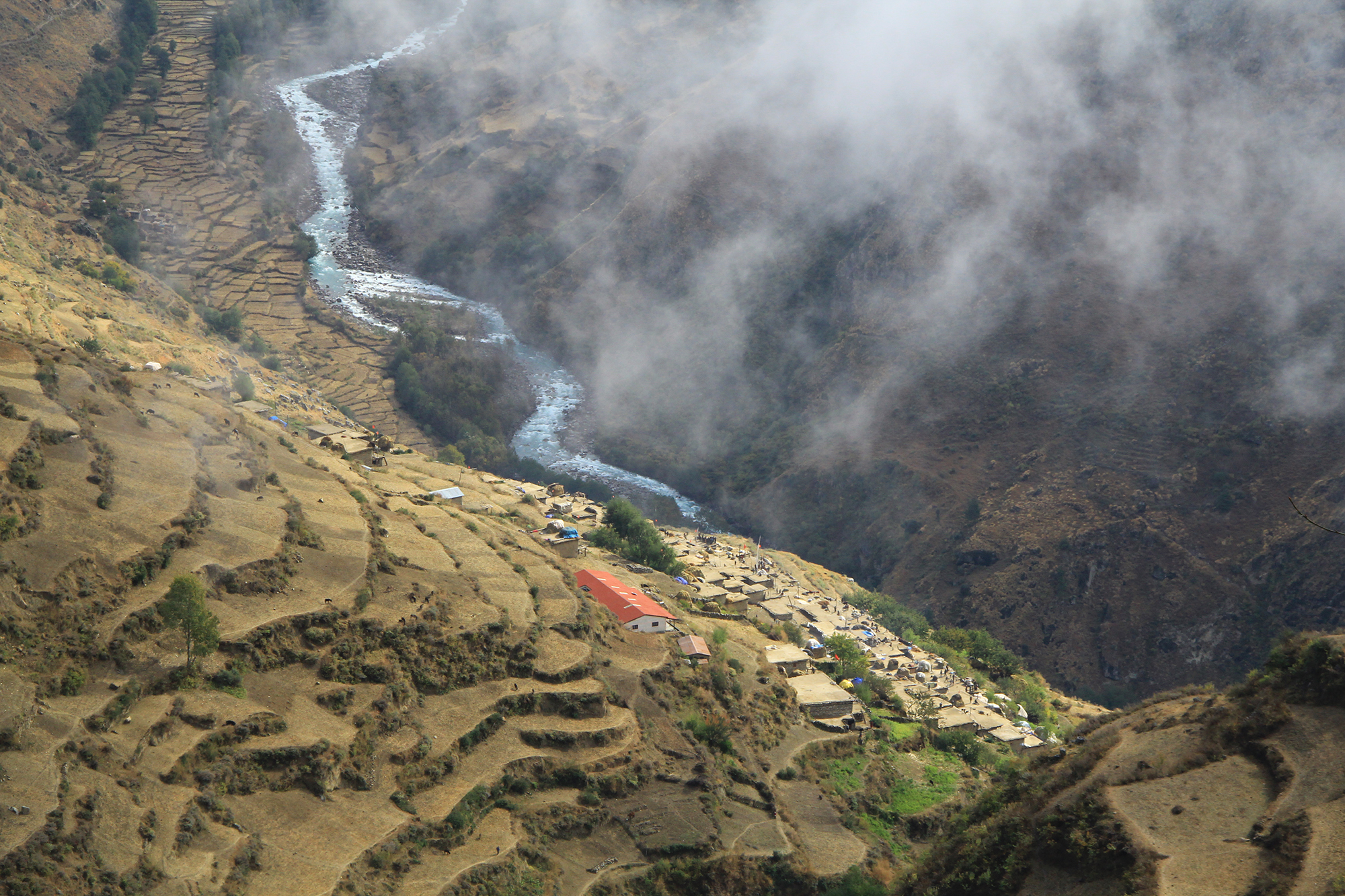
Karnali River in Humla, Nepal

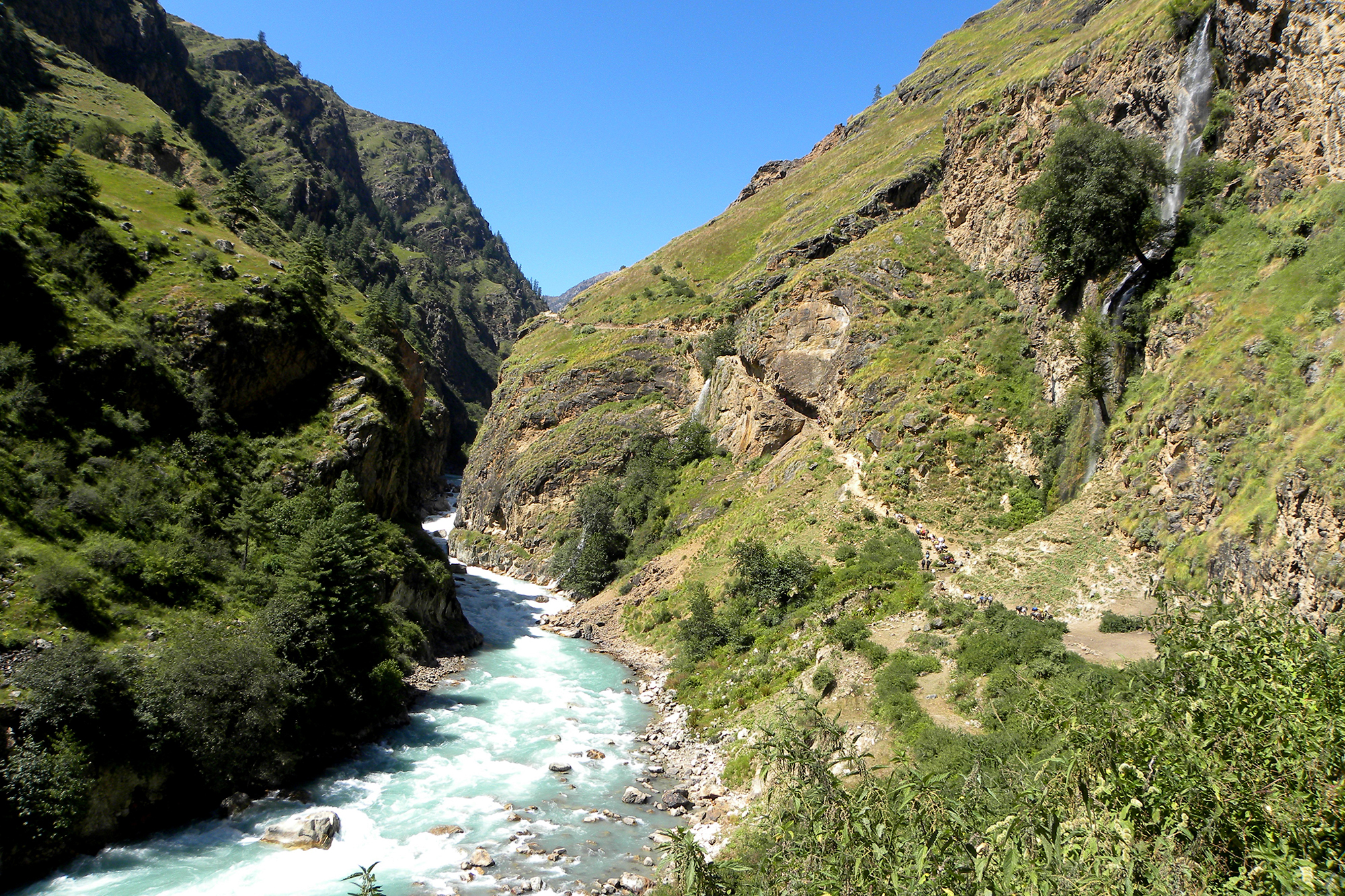
Karnali River in Nepal

Bardia National Park is the largest and most undisturbed protected area in the Karnali River basin, covering 968 km^{2} (374 sq mi) on the southern slopes of the Sivalik Hills. It is bordered in the south by the Babai River, and to the west by the Girwa River, a tributary of the Karnali. At Chisapani Gorge, the swift-flowing Karnali River emerges from the Shiwalik Range onto the broad plain and flows purposefully through the semi-tropical jungle. The park is famous for two Asian elephant herds, several deer species, gaur, nilgai, Himalayan tahr, serow and goral. The Karnali supports the endangered mugger crocodile, the gharial, a few remaining South Asian river dolphins and the golden mahseer.

Other protected areas include Katarniaghat Wildlife Sanctuary.

== Endangered species ==
The Karnali provides the upper range for the Gangetic river dolphin (Platanista gangetica), the largest freshwater mammals found on the Indian subcontinent. They are considered vulnerable species under CITES Appendix 1 and are classified as endangered on the IUCN Red List (IUCN, 2004). The river dolphins are legally protected animals in Nepal as endangered mammal and fall under Schedule I of the protected list of National Parks & Wildlife Conservation Act, 1973. Living at the upstream range limit, dolphins in the Karnali River are particularly vulnerable to threats from habitat degradation. Dolphins need deep pools of water. They are often found in places where human activities are most intense and they are sometimes accidentally caught by the local people who live in the lower Karnali basin. The Karnali River supports the last potentially viable population of the Ganges river dolphin in Nepal. These dolphins are at their farthest upstream range and isolated by the Girijapuri Barrage (a low gated dam), located about 16 kilometres (10 mi) downstream of the Nepal–India border ( in Mihinpurwa district Bahraich).

A high dam has been planned for some time just upstream of the dolphins' current (or at least recent) range in the Karnali River, Nepal. If built, this structure would almost certainly eliminate the small amount of dolphin habitat in Nepal's last river with a potentially viable dolphin population. Disturbance and environmental degradation associated with geotechnical feasibility studies and bridge and road construction for the dam already may have contributed to a decline in the number and range of dolphins or susu above the Nepal-India border. The Ghaghara is the furthest upstream in the dolphin range.

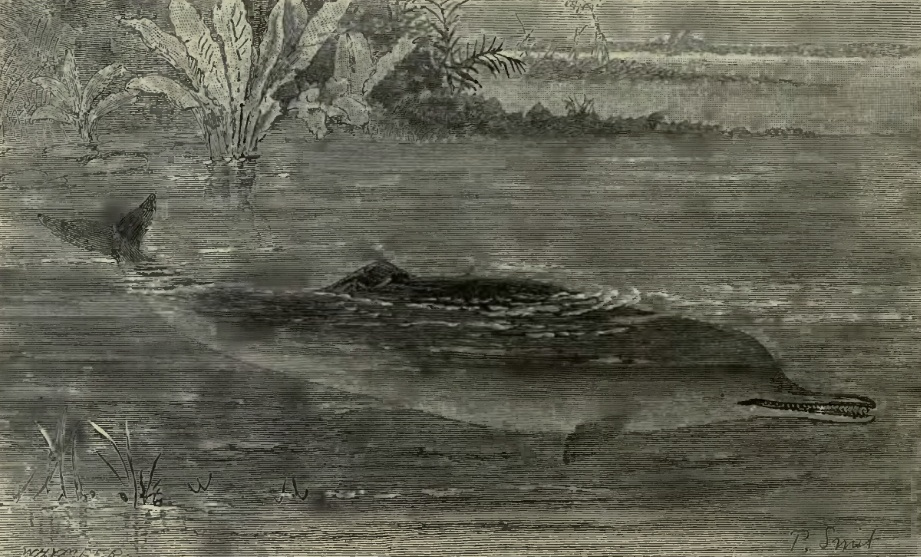
Gangetic dolphin

Other important protected areas and their biological and religious significance are a) Khaptad NP at 2.25 square kilometres (0.87 mi^{2}), Dhorpatan HR at 13.25 square kilometres (5.12 mi^{2}), and WR (1976) at Kanchanpur at 3.05 square kilometres (1.18 mi^{2}) in the Terai Sal.

== Irrigation ==
=== India ===
The Sarda Sahayak Irrigation Project uses the combined flows from the rivers Ghaghara and Sarda in the Girija Barrage built across the Ghaghara river below a catchment area of 45,500 square kilometres (17,600 mi^{2}). This barrage is situated about 9 kilometres (6 mi) downstream of Khatria Ghat Rly station and 16 kilometres (10 mi) from the international border to Nepal in Bahraich district. It is linked to the Lower Sarda Barrage (built across the Sarda river, with a catchment area of 17,818 square kilometres (6,880 mi^{2}), about 28 kilometres (17 mi) northeast of Lakhimpur Kheri Rly station in Lakhimpur Kheri district) via a link canal from Girija Barrage to the Lower Sarda Barrage which is 28 kilometres (17 mi) long and is designed to divert a discharge of 480 cubic metres per second (17,000 cu ft/s) from Gandak to Sarda river.

The feeder channel taking off from the Lower Sarda Barrage is 258.8 kilometres (160.8 mi) long, feeds the five branches of Dariyabad, Barabani, Haideganj, RaeBareil and Purva, and is designed to carry a discharge of 765 cubic metres per second (27,000 cu ft/s). The Sarda Sahayak feeder channel meets the Haidergarh branch at 171 kilometres (106 mi) and Raibareli branch at 187 kilometres (116 mi). The entire canal system is considered the largest in Asia and designed to provide irrigation to a Culturalable Command Area (CCA) of 20,000 square kilometres (7,700 mi^{2}) covering 14 districts in 168 blocks with a gross command area of 40,000 square kilometres (15,000 mi^{2}).

On account of high silt flows during the flood season, Sarda Sahayak supplies (from Karnali) are suspended for 100 days between June and October, when the Lower Sarda Canal (feeder canal) draws water from the Sarda River, which is then flooded.

== Navigation ==
In the past the Karnali River was considered to be attractive for the development of navigation right from the Indo–Nepal border to the confluence of this river and the Ganges. The lower reach of this river—called the Ghaghra in India—was used in the past for navigation by steamers. Apart from in the foothills of the Himalayas where most of the streams were simply fast-moving water throughout the greater part of the year and not navigable when flowing rapidly, most of the rivers with steadier currents had boats on them. The Ganges, the Ghaghra, the Yamuna, the Gomti, the Sharda and the Rapti were the most important navigable rivers in the Northwestern provinces and Oudh.

Many trade items such as timber, food grains, sugar, indigo, cotton seed, poppy seed and mustard seed were transported by boats. April, May and June were the most suitable months and were a busy trading period. Different kinds of cargo boats were used on the Ganges, the smaller ones were known as always, while the larger ones were known as Katris.

In the latter half of the 19th century when the railways came into existence, the significance of waterways as inland trade routes declined, as the railways were faster and safer. With the exception of eastern parts of Bengal where abundance of water in the natural network of channels sustained and continued to provide a suitable mode of transport of goods and people, the railways had almost entirely replaced the waterways as communication lines throughout the country by the end of the 19th century.

The possibilities for further extension of the steamer services to the north had also been explored in the past. The Central Water and Power Commission of the Government of India had carried out hydrographical survey of the Karnali River from the Bahramghat to the confluence of this river and the Ganges a distance of 446 kilometres (277 mi). This survey was done in the years 1943–53 to explore the possibility of improvement and extension of navigation on this river by powered craft. These surveys revealed that there were only 5 shoals under 90 centimetres (35 in) at low water between Burhaj and Bahramghat a distance of about 300 kilometres (190 mi). The minimum depth was 75 centimetres (30 in). These depths were available without any river conservancy works. All other conditions of navigable channel such as the width and current of flow etc. were also found to be very favourable. The low water stage in this river is only for a short duration. There is a great urgency to carry out detailed study of the Karnali river to develop modern inland waterway by applying various channel improvement technologies.

== Cultural importance ==
=== In epics ===
The river is mentioned various times in the ancient Indian epic Ramayana. Sarayu refers to Lower Ghaghara, which flows through the city of Ayodhya, the birthplace of the Hindu deity Rama, who, along with the residents of Ayodhya, attained Vaikuntha from this river. According to the legend, Urmila, wife of Lakshmana, performed samadhi by drowning herself on the banks of the river Sarayu, and it is believed that her soul attained salvation at Rama's feet.

=== In fiction ===
- Sarayu is also the name of the river that flows by the fictional town of Malgudi created by the Indian writer R. K. Narayan.
- Sarayu is the name given to the personification of the Holy Spirit in "The Shack" created by American Novelist William P. Young.

== See also ==
- List of rivers of Nepal
- List of rivers of India
- Battle of Ghaghra
