= Aman Singh Gulati =

Indian visual artist

- Born: 11 October 2000 (age 26); Lakhimpur Kheri, Uttar Pradesh, India
- Awards: Sikh Award's People's Choice Award for Contribution To Art (2018) Guinness World Record for Largest Hand Drawing (2019) Listed In Top 100 Sikhs Under 30 Around World (2020)
- Website: www.amansinghgulati.com

Aman Singh Gulati (born 11 October 2000) is an Indian visual artist. He paints artworks on multiple miniature objects including almonds, matchsticks etc. He achieved multiple national and international awards including multiple world records, including Guinness World Records. Some of Gulati's works promote various social causes. In 2019, he created a portrait of each of the 44 soldiers who died in the then-recent Pulwama attack.

== Early life and education ==
Aman Singh Gulati was born on 11 October 2000 in Lakhimpur Kheri district, Uttar Pradesh, India. He was educated at St. Don Bosco's College and the National Institute of Open Schooling. In 2021 he started his graduation from the University of Delhi. Gulati started painting at the age of six, learning to paint from his mother Bhavna Gulati, an artist herself. He liked to paint on miniature artworks from his childhood.

== Career ==
Gulati has worked on multiple forms of art. He has created and almond art series titled "Soul of Sikhism Volume 1", dedicated to the first Sikh guru, Nanak. Later he launched Volume 9 dedicated to the ninth Sikh guru, Tegh Bahadur.

Gulati's records include the world's largest drawing of Mahatma Gandhi, the biggest puzzle portrait of Guru Gobind Singh, the largest rakhi dedicated to the Indian Army, the largest paperback replica of Ram Naik.

Aman paints almond portraits of celebrities, politicians, and artists from around the world. Some of his subjects include Guru Nanak, Krishna, Jacinda Arden, Boris Johnson, Sheikh Mohammad, Mahatma Gandhi, Donald Trump, Narendra Modi, Audrey Azuley, Amitabh Bacchhan, Sushant Singh Rajpoot, Wajid Khan, Rishi Kapoor, and Irfan Khan.

His artworks and almond art series have been unveiled by Om Birla, Rajnath Singh, and Ram Naik. Gulati's work has been exhibited In various art exhibitions such as Sikhlens Art Exhibition in Chandigarh.

For the 150th anniversary of Mahatma Gandhi's birth, Gulati created the world's largest pencil sketch, a portrait of Gandhi.

"Art Finds Its Way", a short film depicting Gulati's life, was shown at the 2021 Sikh Art and Film Festival.

== Exhibition ==
Year	Event's name	Venue
2020	Sikhlens Art & Film Festival	Tagore Theatre (Chandigarh)
2021	Sikhlens Art & Film Festival	Tagore Theatre (Chandigarh)

== Personal life ==
Gulati's mother, Bhavna Gulati, is also an artist. His father Pradeep Gulati runs a garment business in Lakhimpur Kheri district. Gulati has a younger brother, Manan Singh Gulati.

== Awards and recognition ==
Sikh Award's People's Choice Award for Contribution To Art (2018)

Guinness World Record for Largest Hand Drawing (2019)

Listed in Top 100 Sikhs Under 30 Around World (2020)
