= Ravi Gulati (activist) =

- Born: 1969 (age 56–57); Delhi
- Education: IIM Ahmedabad
- Occupations: Social activist & Founder of Manzil

Ravi Gulati (born 1969) is an Indian social activist. He gives after school tuitions to the underprivileged in New Delhi.

== Early life ==
Ravi Gulati is born in New Delhi to Indira, an NGO worker. He graduated with an MBA from IIM, Ahmedabad.

== Career ==
Ravi Gulati began his corporate career in Canada only to give up eight months later. He returned to pursue a hands-on course in Environment Education from CEE, Ahmedabad. He was then involved with Trees for Life (later HIMCON), an NGO working with rural Himalayan communities. He is a board member of Jansamarth, an NGO working in remote Himalayan villages for generating electricity through micro-hydro power plants for lighting and livelihoods.

=== Manzil ===
Ravi Gulati took to teaching children of drivers, barbers and maids near his home in New Delhi's Khan Market. He wanted to work in the villages but stayed back in Delhi because two poor children needed tuitions from him. While he taught them he realised what he was doing was equally important in urban India as what he would have done in rural India.

He started an NGO, Manzil, along with his mother and Dr. Geeta Chopra. The organisation has a branch at Kotla, a slum area in Delhi.
