= Politics of Lakhimpur Kheri =

Politics of Lakhimpur Kheri district, Uttar Pradesh, India

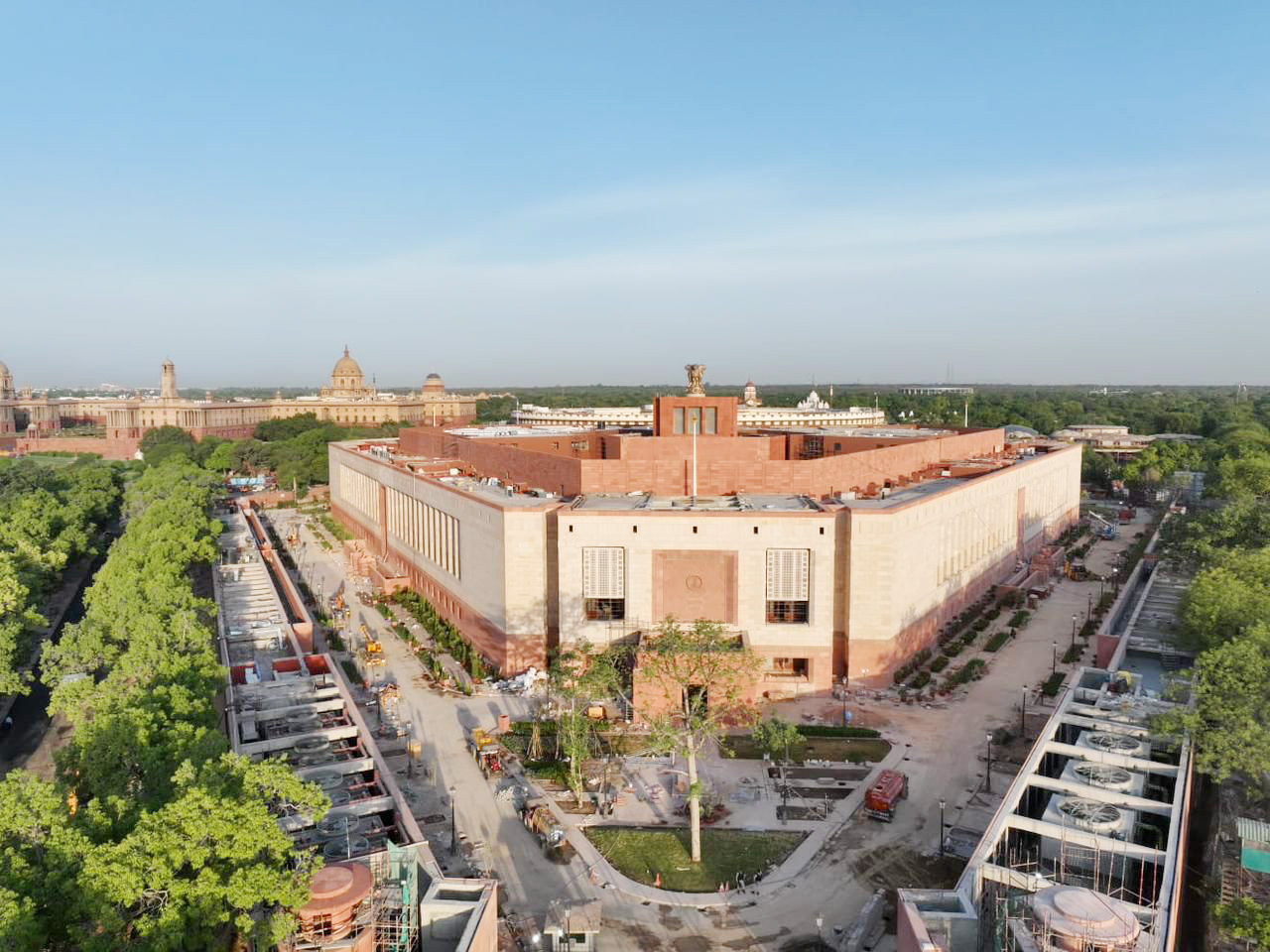
Parliament of India.

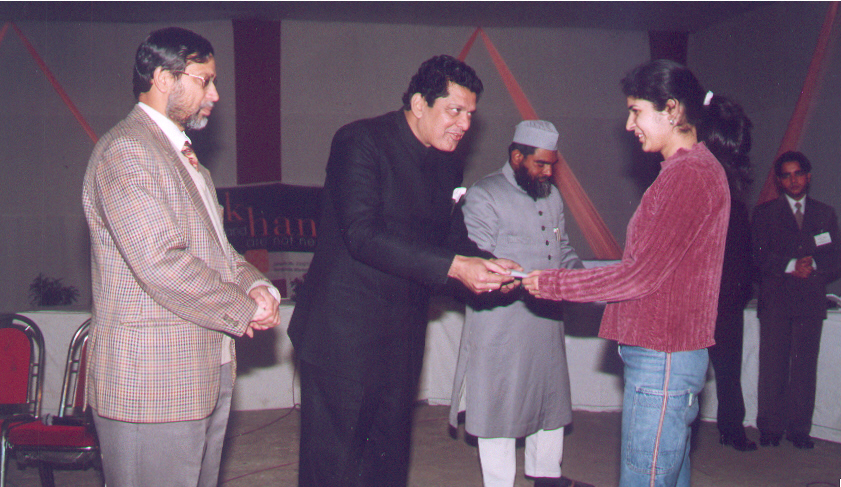
Zafar Ali Naqvi as Chief Guest for the prize distribution ceremony of IT festival – Nerdz 2003, New Delhi

Lakhimpur Kheri district is further divided in following sub categories:

- 2 Parliamentary Constituencies – Kheri, and Dhaurahra
- 8 Assembly Constituencies – Mohammadi, Gola Gokarannath, Kasta, Lakhimpur, Srinagar, Nighasan, Dhaurahara, Palia Kalan.
- 7 Tehsils – Lakhimpur, Mohammdi, Gola Gokarannath, Nighasan, Dhaurahra, Palia Kalan, Mitauli
- 15 blocks – Lakhimpur, Behjam, Mitauli, Pasgawan, Mohammdi, Gola Gokarannath, Bankeyganj, Bijuwa, Paliya, Nighasan, Ramiyabehar, Issanagar, Dhaurahara, Nakaha, Phoolbehar.
- 4 Nagar Palikas – Lakhimpur, Gola Gokarannath, Mohammadi, Palia Kalan
- 6 Town Areas – Kheri, Oel, Mailani, Ba arbar, Singahi, Dhaurahar, Aminnagar, Phardhan

== List of members of Parliament ==
=== Kheri ===
- 1957: Kushwaqt Rai, Praja Socialist Party
- 1962: Balgovind Verma, Indian National Congress
- 1967: Balgovind Verma, Indian National Congress
- 1971: Balgovind Verma, Indian National Congress
- 1984: Usha Verma, Indian National Congress
- 1998: Ravi Prakash Verma, Samajwadi Party
- 1999: Ravi Prakash Verma, Samajwadi Party
- 2004: Ravi Prakash Verma, Samajwadi Party
- 2009: Zafar Ali Naqvi, Indian National Congress
- 2014:Ajay Kumar Mishra, Bhartiya Janta Party

=== Dhaurahra ===
- 2009: Jitin Prasada, Indian National Congress
- 2014 Rekha Arun Verma Bhartiya Janta Party

== List of members of Legislative Assembly ==
=== Lakhimpur ===
- 1969: Pt. Tej Narayan Trivedi, Indian National Congress
- 1974: Pt. Tej Narayan Trivedi, Indian National Congress
- 1980: Zafar Ali Naqvi, Indian National Congress
- 1989: Zafar Ali Naqvi, Indian National Congress
- 2007: DR. Kaushal Kishore, Samajwadi Party
- 2010: Utkarsh Verma, Samajwadi Party
- 2012: Utkarsh Verma, Samajwadi Party
- 2017: Yogesh Verma, BJP

=== Dhaurahara ===
- 1962: Pt. Tej Narayan Trivedi, Indian National Congress
- 1980: Pt. Tej Narayan Trivedi, Independent
- 2007: Awasthi Bala Prashad, BSP
- 2012: Shamsher Bhadur, BSP
- 2017, BALA PRASHAD AWASTHI, BJP

=== Gola Gokarannath ===
- 1997: Arvind Giri, Samajwadi Party
- 2002: Arvind Giri, Samajwadi Party
- 2007: Arvind Giri, Samajwadi Party
- 2012: Vinay Tiwari, Samajwadi Party.
- 2017: Arvind Giri, Bharatiya Janata Party
- 2022: Arvind Giri, Bhartiya Janata Party

=== Kasta ===
- 2012: Sunil Kumar Lala, SP
- 2017: Saurab Singh, BJP

=== Mohammdi ===
- 2012: Awasthi Bala Prasad, BSP
- 2017: Lokendra Pratap Singh BJP

=== Nighasan ===
- 1952: Thakur Karan Singh, Indian National Congress
- 1967: Thakur Karan Singh, Indian National Congress
- 1969: Thakur Karan Singh, Indian National Congress
- 2014: Krishna Gopal Patel, Samajwadi Party
- 2017: Patel ramkumar Verma, Bhartiya janta party
- 2019(by poll): Shashank Verma, Bhartiya janta party

=== Palia Kalan ===
- 2012: Harvinder Kumar Sahani, BSP
- 2017: Harvinder Kumar Sahani, Bhartiya Janata Party

=== Srinagar ===
- 1991: Pt. Tej Narayan Trivedi, Indian National Congress
- 2007: R. A. Usmani, Samajwadi Party
- 2012: Ramsaran, Samajwadi Party
- 2017: Manju tyagi, Bhartiya janta Party

== List of members of Legislative Council ==
- 1958: Pt. Tej Narayan Trivedi, Indian National Congress

== List of presidents of Zila Parishad ==
- 1989–91: Pt. Tej Narayan Trivedi, Indian National Congress

== Indian general election, 2009 ==
Zafar Ali Naqvi of the Indian National Congress party was elected to the Lok Sabha to represent Kheri in the 2009 Parliamentary Elections, beating Iliyas Azmi of the Bahujan Samaj Party by 8,780 votes.

Jitin Prasada, former Union Minister of State for Steel, was elected to represent Dhaurahra, with a winning margin of 184,509 votes. On 28 May 2009, Jitin Prasada was sworn in as Minister of State to the Union Government of India, in the Council of Ministers of Prime Minister Manmohan Singh. Jitin is the Minister of State in the Ministry of Petroleum and Natural Gas.

== See also ==
- Politics of India
- Kheri (Lok Sabha constituency)
- Dhaurahra (Lok Sabha constituency)
