= Palia Kalan =

- City
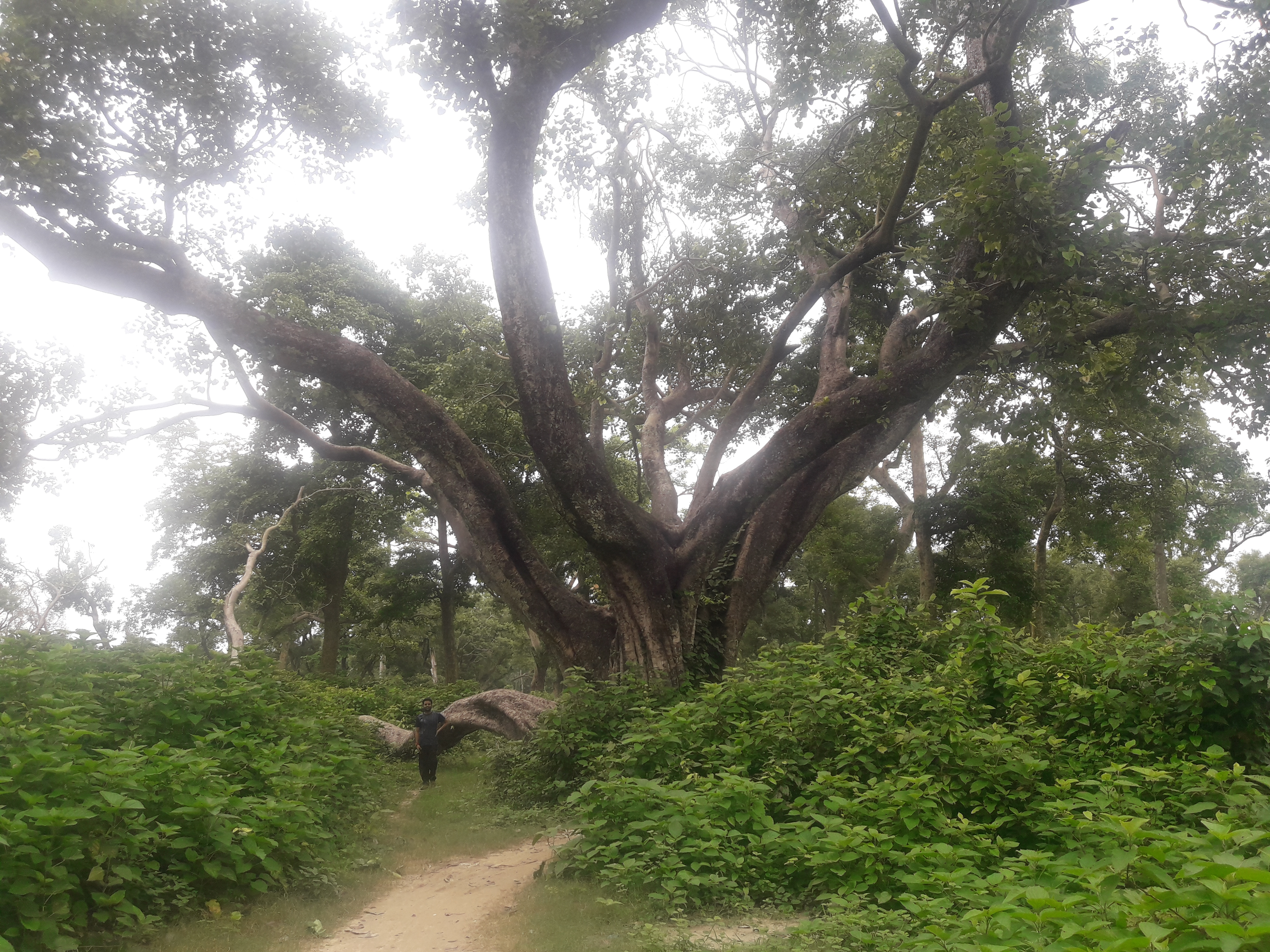
- Forest near Palia Kalan, Lakhimpur Kheri, UP.

- Location in India
- Coordinates: 28°27′N 80°35′E
- Country: India
- State: Uttar Pradesh
- District: Lakhimpur Kheri
- Nearest city: Lakhimpur city

Government
  - Type: Chairman
  - Body: Nagar Palika Parishad
  - MLA: Harvindar Kumar Sahani (BJP)

Area
  - Total: 1,576 km^{2} (608 sq mi)

Population (2011)
  - Total: 41,126
  - Density: 26.10/km^{2} (67.59/sq mi)

Language
  - Official: Hindi
- Time zone: UTC+5:30 (IST)
- Postal code: 262902
- Vehicle registration: UP-31

Palia Kalan is a city and a municipal board, near Lakhimpur city in Lakhimpur Kheri district in the Indian State of Uttar Pradesh.

It is also home to Dudhwa National Park, a wildlife park that boasts of rhinos, tigers, wild tuskers, the rare barking deer and many migratory birds. The flora and fauna is that of a typical marsh town, small lakes, elephant grass, etc.

== Geography ==
The river Sharda flows close to the town. The north part is covered with forest of Dudwa while south with forest of Mailani. Palia is situated close to the Nepal border, with the Nepalese town of Dhangadhi around 35 km (22 mi) by road. Palia shares its boundaries with Mailani, Bhira, Khutar and Shahjahapur. The Dudwa National Park is just 12 km (7.5 mi) away from it.

== Economy ==
Palia is a quick growing town of prosperous and rich Sikh farmers. The main occupation is farming. Bajaj Hindusthan Limited (BHL) sugar plant, distillery and an eco-friendly plywood production unit. The sugar production plant is second largest sugar production unit in Asia and the plywood production plant is only second plant in the world which produces plywood with bio-gas. Bajaj Hindusthan Limited (BHL) sugar plant with a cane crushing capacity of 1400 TCD was set up in 1972 at Palia Kalan, a large cane supplying centre at a distance of about 75 km (47 mi) from Bajaj's first sugar plant in Gola Gokarannath. The objective of this new Unit was primarily to help the cane growers of the area supply their produce to the new location closer to their fields, thereby cutting down on transportation costs. The capacity was subsequently increased in stages to reach the present 11,000 TCD.

The influx of tourists to Dudhwa National Park and Nepal directly contributes to the economic activities of Palia Kalan. Numerous hotels, restaurants, lodges, and resorts have been established in Palia Kalan to cater to the needs of visitors. These establishments range from budget accommodations to more luxurious options, providing a variety of choices for tourists.

Apart from hotels and restaurants, other local businesses are also present.

== Demographics ==
As of the 2011 Indian census, the total population of Palia Kalan was 41,126.

Religions in Palia
Religion	Percent
Hindus	70%
Muslims	29%
Jains	0.5%
Others†	0.5%
Distribution of religions †Includes Sikhs (0.2%), Buddhists (<0.2%).

== Transport ==
Palia is connected to Lucknow through Uttar Pradesh State Highway 25 (UP SH 25) Lucknow Marg.

The new National Highway 731 is under construction which connects Palia-Shahjahanpur-Hardoi-Lucknow.

Lakhimpur Kheri Airport (also known as 'Palia Airport') is situated near Dudhwa National Park at Palia Kalan in Lakhimpur Kheri. It is not operational yet and is at a distance of 90 km (56 mi) from Lakhimpur City, and approximately 5 km (3.1 mi) from Palia. The redevelopment of the airstrip as an airport has been proposed as of May 2024.

The town is connected through a metre-gauge railway. It lies in Mailani-Nanpara metre gauge section.

== See also ==
- Kheri (Lok Sabha constituency)
- Dhaurahra (Lok Sabha constituency)
- Dudhwa National Park
- Palia Assembly constituency
