= Kheri Lok Sabha constituency =

Lok Sabha Constituency in Uttar Pradesh, India

Coordinates: 27.92°N 80.73°E

Kheri UP-28
- Lok Sabha constituency
- Interactive Map Outlining Kheri Lok Sabha constituency

Constituency details
- Country: India
- Region: North India
- State: Uttar Pradesh
- Assembly constituencies: Palia; Nighasan; Gola Gokarannath; Sri Nagar; Lakhimpur
- Established: 1957
- Reservation: None

Member of Parliament
- 18th Lok Sabha
- Incumbent Utkarsh Verma
- Party: Samajwadi Party
- Elected year: 2024

Kheri Lok Sabha constituency is one of the 80 Lok Sabha (parliamentary) constituencies in the Indian state of Uttar Pradesh.

== Assembly segments ==
Presently, Kheri Lok Sabha constituency comprises five Vidhan Sabha (legislative assembly) segments. These are:

No	Name	District	Member	Party	2024 Lead
137	Palia	Lakhimpur Kheri	Harvindar Kumar Sahani	BJP	BJP
138	Nighasan	Lakhimpur Kheri	Shashank Verma	BJP	BJP
139	Gola Gokrannath	Lakhimpur Kheri	Aman Giri	BJP	SP
140	Sri Nagar (SC)	Lakhimpur Kheri	Manju Tyagi	BJP	SP
142	Lakhimpur	Lakhimpur Kheri	Yogesh Verma	BJP	SP

== Members of Parliament ==
Year	Member	Party
1957	Kushwaqt Rai	Praja Socialist Party
1962	Balgovind Verma	Indian National Congress
1967	Balgovind Verma	Indian National Congress
1971	Balgovind Verma	Indian National Congress
1977	Surat Bahadur Shah	Janata Party
1980	Balgovind Verma	Indian National Congress
1980^	Usha Verma	Indian National Congress
1984	Usha Verma	Indian National Congress
1989	Usha Verma	Indian National Congress
1991	Gendan Lal Kanaujia	Bharatiya Janata Party
1996	Gendan Lal Kanaujia	Bharatiya Janata Party
1998	Ravi Prakash Verma	Samajwadi Party
1999	Ravi Prakash Verma	Samajwadi Party
2004	Ravi Prakash Verma	Samajwadi Party
2009	Zafar Ali Naqvi	Indian National Congress
2014	Ajay Mishra Teni	Bharatiya Janata Party
2019	Ajay Mishra Teni	Bharatiya Janata Party
2024	Utkarsh Verma	Samajwadi Party

^ by poll

== Elections results ==
=== 2024 ===
2024 Indian general election: Kheri
Party	Candidate	Votes	%	±%
SP	Utkarsh Verma	557,365	45.94	▲11.56
BJP	Ajay Mishra Teni	5,23,036	43.11	▼10.52
BSP	Anshay Kalra	1,10,460	9.10	▲9.10
NOTA	None of the above	7,931	0.65	▼0.12
Majority		34,329	2.83	▼16.42
Turnout		12,13,359	64.88	▲0.68
SP gain from BJP		Swing		

=== 2019 ===
2019 Indian general elections: Kheri
Party	Candidate	Votes	%	±%
BJP	Ajay Mishra Teni	609,589	53.63	
SP	Dr. Purvi Verma	3,90,782	34.38	
INC	Zafar Ali Naqvi	92,155	8.11	
CPI	Vipnesh Shukla	11,857	1.04	
NOTA	None of the above	8,750	0.77	
Majority		2,18,807	19.25	
Turnout		11,36,772	64.20	+0.02
BJP hold		Swing		

=== 2014 election results ===
2014 Indian general elections: Kheri
Party	Candidate	Votes	%	±%
BJP	Ajay Mishra Teni	3,98,578	36.98	
BSP	Arvind Giri	2,88,304	26.75	
INC	Zafar Ali Naqvi	1,83,940	17.06	
SP	Ravi Prakash Verma	1,60,112	14.85	
CPI	Vipnesh	16,401	1.52	
NOTA	None of the above	12,031	1.12	
Majority		1,10,274	10.23	
Turnout		10,77,881	64.18	
BJP gain from INC		Swing		

== See also ==
- Kheri
- Lakhimpur Kheri district
- Politics of Lakhimpur Kheri
- List of constituencies of the Lok Sabha
