= Gola Gokarannath railway station =

Railway station in Uttar Pradesh

- Indian Railways logo

General information
- Location: Gola Gokarannath, Lakhimpur, Uttar Pradesh; India
- Coordinates: 28.083333°N 80.476742°E
- Elevation: 152 metres (499 ft)
- System: Indian Railways station
- Owner: Indian Railways
- Operator: North Eastern Railway
- Lines: Aishbagh-Bareilly Section (Vaya Sitapur, Pilibhit); OR: Lucknow–Bareilly Railway
- Platforms: 3
- Tracks: 4
- Connections: Auto stand, Roadways bus stand

Construction
- Structure type: Standard (on ground station)
- Parking: Open Parking
- Cycle facilities: Yes

Other information
- Status: Active
- Station code: GK
- Zone(s): North Eastern Railway
- Division(s): Lucknow NER

History
- Opened: 1885
- Rebuilt: Yes 2020

Services
Location
- Location within India Location within Uttar Pradesh

Gola Gokarannath railway station is main railway station in Gola Gokarannath City. This station is one of the suburban railway stations in Lucknow NER Division. Its code is GK. It serves Gola Gokarannath city. The station consists of three platforms and goods siding. There are direct trains available for Mailani, Lakhimpur, Lucknow, Gonda, Barabanki, Varanasi, Lalkuan, Izzatnagar, Howrah, and Gorakhpur. More trains are expected in future for New Delhi, Jaipur, Haridwar, Pune, Mumbai, Kanpur, Jhansi and other major cities of India.
