= Lakhimpur =

Lakhimpur may refer to:

- Lakhimpur district, in Assam, India
  - North Lakhimpur, a city
  - Lakhimpur Lok Sabha constituency
  - Lakhimpur, Assam Assembly constituency
- Lakhimpur Kheri district, Uttar Pradesh, India
  - Lakhimpur, Uttar Pradesh, a city
  - Lakhimpur, Uttar Pradesh Assembly constituency
