= List of state highways in Uttar Pradesh =

Uttar Pradesh state has two major road networks. There are 35 national highways (not listed here), with a total length of 40,635 km (25,249 mi), and 83 state highways, with a total length of 8,432 km (5,239 mi).

UP SH No.	OSM relation	Road Name	Districts	Total length (in Km)
UP SH 1	1459166	Sonauli–Nautanwa–Gorakhpur–Deoria–Ballia Marg	Maharajganj, Gorakhpur, Deoria, Ballia	154.13
UP SH 1A	1459168	Pharenda–Naugarh–Basti–Shrivasti Marg	Maharajganj, Siddharthnagar, Balrampur, Gonda	229.55
UP SH 1B	1455427	Sikandarpur–Basdih–Rewati–Bairia–Lalganj Marg	Ballia	67.79
UP SH 5	1459193	Lumbini–Duddhi Marg	Siddharthnagar, Basti, Ambedakarnagar, Jaunpur, Bhadohi, Mirzapur, Sonbhadra	351.34
UP SH 5A	1559983	Varanasi–Shaktinagar Marg	Mirzapur, Sonbhadra	135.47
UP SH 7	1562181	Allahabad–Gorakhpur Marg	Allahabad, Jaunpur	106.56
UP SH 9	2740038	Utaraula–Faizabad–Allahabad Marg	Balrampur, Gonda, Faizabad, Sultanpur	74.23
UP SH 9A	2740051	Akabarpur–Mahrua–Katka Marg	Ambedakarnagar, Sultanpur	44.65
UP SH 12	1484848	Panipat–Khatima Marg	Muzaffarnagar, Bijnor	146.98
UP SH 12A	2350116	Muzaffarnagar–Jansath–Mirapur Marg	Muzaffarnagar	28.30
UP SH 13	1426850	Bahraich–Barabanki–Haidargarh–Fatehpur–Banda Marg	Bahraich, Barabanki, Raebareli, Fatehpur district, Banda	228.20
UP SH 14	1583138	Garhmukteshwar–Meerut–Baghpat–Sonipat Marg	Hapur, Meerut, Baghpat	90.42
UP SH 15	1424330	Faizabad–Raebareli Marg	Faizabad, Sultanpur, Raebareli	108.40
UP SH 17	2962122	Kanpur–Hamirpur–Sagar Marg	Kanpur, Hamirpur	4.89
UP SH 18	1480538	Meerut–Budaun Marg	Meerut, Ghaziabad, Bulandshahr, Budaun	172.66
UP SH 21	1453628	Bilaraya–Lakhimpur–Sitapur–Panwari Marg	Kheri, Sitapur, Hardoi, Kannauj, Auraiya, Jalaun, Hamirpur, Mahoba	385.46
UP SH 22	Missing	Delhi–Kanpur Marg	Ghaziabad	490.00
UP SH 22A	2808244	Palwal–Tappal Marg	Aligarh	65.25
UP SH 25	1469980	Paliya–Lucknow Marg	Lakhimpur Kheri, Shahjahanpur, Hardoi, Lucknow	265.50
UP SH 26	1459686	Pilibhit–Lakhimpur–Bahraich–Basti Marg	Pilibhit, Shahjahanpur, Lakhimpur Kheri, Bahraich, Shravasti, Balrampur, Siddharthnagar, Basti	402.03
UP SH 29	1474709	Leepulekha–Pilibhit–Shahjahanpur–Etawah Marg	Pilibhit, Shahjahanpur, Farrukhabad, Mainpuri	214.87
UP SH 29A	1569399	Fatehgarh–Gursahayganj Marg	Farrukhabad, Kannauj, Hardoi	63.83
UP SH 30	1460749	Bahraich–Faizabad–Sitapur Marg	Bahraich, Gonda, Faizabad, Ambedkar Nagar, Azamgarh	248.88
UP SH 30A	2963842	Maya–Tanda Marg	Faizabad, Ambedkar Nagar	34.05
UP SH 30B	1460750	Bahraich–Sitapur Marg	Bahraich, Sitapur	78.36
UP SH 31	1570354	Etah–Tundala Marg	Etah, Firozabad	57.16
UP SH 33	1474055	Pilibhit–Bareilly–Mathura–Bharatpur Marg	Pilibhit, Bareilly, Budaun, Kasganj, Hathras, Mathura	232.32
UP SH 34	1423713	Lucknow–Azamgarh–Ballia Marg	Raebareli, Sultanpur, Jaunpur, Azamgarh, Mau, Ballia	315.98
UP SH 36	1423715	Lucknow–Raebareli–Jaunpur, Uttar Pradesh–Varanasi Marg	Lucknow, Raebareli, Pratapgarh, Jaunpur, Ghazipur	293.25
UP SH 37	1474056	Bareilly–Almora–Bageshwar Marg (Nainital Road)	Bareilly (Almora, Bageshwar: Uttarakhand state)	56.00
UP SH 38	1426849	Bilgram–Unnao–Allahabad Marg	Hardoi, Unnao, Raebareli, Allahabad	221.21
UP SH 39	1607706	Chandausi–Agra–Jagen–Tantpur Marg	(Sambhal) Agra	76.56
UP SH 40	1453625	Lucknow–Mohana–Nanamau–Bela–Etawah Marg	Lucknow, Unnao, Kanpur Nagar, Kanpur Dehat, Auraiya, Kanpur Dehat (Etawah)	142.49
UP SH 41	1482590	Tehari–Ramnagar–Moradabad Marg	(Uttarakhand state) Moradabad	43.75
UP SH 42	1566153	Hamirpur–Gursarai–Jhansi Marg	Hamirpur, Jhansi	153.45
UP SH 43	1475052	Moradabad–Farrukhabad Marg	Moradabad, Budaun, Shahjahanpur, Farrukhabad	167.18
UP SH 46	1452490	Pukhrayan–Ghatampur–Bindki Marg	Kanpur Dehat, Kanpur Nagar, Fatehpur	83.66
UP SH 49	1483518	Moradabad–Haridwar–Dehradun Marg	Moradabad, Bijnor	62.60
UP SH 51	1477035	Bijnor–Gajraula–Hasanpur–Budaun Marg	Budaun, Moradabad, Amroha, Bijnor	209.13
UP SH 57	1492404	Delhi–Saharanpur–Yamunotri Marg	Ghaziabad, Baghpat, Muzaffarnagar, Saharanpur	206.00
UP SH 58	2963843	Unnao–Kanpur Marg	Unnao	15.88
UP SH 70	1567288	Jalaun–Bhinda Marg (State Border)	Jalaun	30.68
UP SH 73	1562377	Varanasi–Azamgarh Marg	Varanasi, Jaunpur, Azamgarh	78.20
UP SH 74	2963844	Varanasi–Adalapur–Chunar–Kachhanwa Marg	Varanasi, Mirzapur	46.50
UP SH 75	1459203	Domariaganj–Dewarua Marg	Siddharthnagar	41.43
UP SH 76	1483519	Bijnor–Noorpur–Chhijlet Marg	Bijnor, Moradabad	57.30
UP SH 77	1484047	Nahataur–Noorpur–Amroha–Joya Marg	Bijnor, Amroha	59.18
UP SH 78	2963845	Amroha–Kailasa–Pakwarah Marg	Amroha	21.65
UP SH 79	1459169	Deoria–Kasya–Padrauna Marg	Deoria, Kushinagar	34.00
UP SH 80	1570353	Aligarh–Mathura Marg	Aligarh	38.96
UP SH 81	1459164	Gorakhpur–Mahrajganj Marg	Gorakhpur, Maharajganj	53.16
UP SH 82	1492405	Meerut–Karnal Marg	Meerut, Muzaffarnagar	87.16
UP SH 83	1569398	Etawah–Mainpuri Marg	Etawah, Mainpuri	52.83
UP SH 84	1569397	Firozabad–Shikohabad–Mainpuri Marg	Firozabad, Mainpuri	61.80
UP SH 84A	2963846	Mainpuri–Kuraoli Marg	Mainpuri	17.80
UP SH 85	2877088	Etah–Shikohabad Marg	Etah, Firozabad	52.54
UP SH 86	1459165	Pharenda–Mahrajganj Marg	Maharajganj	30.00
UP SH 87	1558295	Varanasi–Bhadohi–Gopiganj Marg	Varanasi, Bhadohi	60.12
UP SH 88	2963847	Bansi–Mehdawal–Khalilabad Marg	Siddharthnagar, Sant Kabir Nagar	49.10
UP SH 90	1465935	Lakhimpur–Bijua–Palia–Gaurifanta Marg	Lakhimpur Kheri	91.03
UP SH 91	2963848	Hamirpur–Kalpi Marg	Hamirpur, Jalaun	51.90
UP SH 92	1443679	Banda–Baberu–Kamsin–Rajapur Marg	Banda, Chitrakoot	88.65
UP SH 93	1471438	Gola–Shahjahanpur Marg	Lakhimpur Kheri, Shahjahanpur	58.62
UP SH 94	2747364	Suratganj–Rajapur–Muratganj Marg	Kaushambi	47.00
UP SH 95	2747365	Manauri–Sarai Ankil–Kaushambi Marg	Kaushambi	36.85
UP SH 96	2962225	Nanpara–Shankarpur–Lalpur–Hajurpur Marg	Shravasti	16.60
UP SH 96A	2962225	Bahraich–Bhinga–Sirasiya–Chaudhari–Dih Marg	Bahraich, Shravasti	39.00
UP SH 97	2963849	Jiwnathapur–Kanchanpur–Sikandarpur–Chakiya–Madhupur Marg	Mirzapur, Chandauli	91.50
UP SH 98	1562375	Kachhawan–Babatpur–Jamalpur Marg	Varanasi	73.07
UP SH 99	1455424	Tarihghat–Bara Chausa–Kumhar Marg	Ghazipur	39.60
	Grand Total			8,432
