= Palia Airstrip =

- IATA: none; ICAO: none

Summary
- Airport type: Public
- Owner: Civil Aviation Department (Government of Uttar Pradesh)
- Operator: Civil Aviation Department (Government of Uttar Pradesh)
- Serves: Dudhwa National Park, Lakhimpur Kheri
- Location: Palia Kalan, Lakhimpur Kheri, Uttar Pradesh, India
- Elevation AMSL: 518 ft / 158 m
- Coordinates: 28°28′03″N 080°34′39″E

Map
- Location of the airport in Uttar Pradesh Palia Airstrip (India)

Runways
Direction	Length		Surface
Direction	ft	m	Surface
12/30	4,971	1,515	Asphalt

Palia Airstrip is an airstrip situated near Dudhwa National Park at Palia Kalan in Lakhimpur Kheri District in the Indian state of Uttar Pradesh. It is situated 90 km away from district headquarter Lakhimpur City.

== Airlines and destinations ==
The airport/airstrip has only unscheduled chartered flights.
