= Ravi Prakash Verma =

Indian politician

MP of Rajya Sabha for Uttar Pradesh
- In office 2014–2020
- Succeeded by: Seema Dwivedi
- Constituency: Uttar Pradesh

MP of Lok Sabha
- In office 1998–2009
- Preceded by: Gendan Lal Kanaujia
- Succeeded by: Zafar Ali Naqvi
- Constituency: Kheri

Personal details
- Born: 26 August 1960 (age 65) Kheri, Uttar Pradesh, India
- Party: Indian National Congress (from may 2026)
- Other political affiliations: Samajwadi Party (till May 2026)
- Spouse: Anita Verma
- Children: 2
- Website: www.raviprakashverma.in

Ravi Prakash (born 26 August 1960) is an Indian politician for the Kheri (Lok Sabha constituency) in Uttar Pradesh he was in Samajwadi Party and recently joined the Indian National Congress Party in May 2026 who since 2014 is a member of the Upper House (Rajya Sabha) of the Indian Parliament.
