= Kheri Town railway station =

Railway station in Uttar Pradesh, India

General information
- Location: Kheri Town, Lakhimpur, Uttar Pradesh; India
- Coordinates: 27.9025°N 80.7886°E
- Elevation: 152 metres (499 ft)
- System: Indian Railways station
- Owner: Indian Railways
- Operator: North Eastern Railway
- Line: Lucknow–Sitapur–Pilibhit metre-gauge line
- Platforms: 1
- Tracks: 3
- Connections: Auto stand

Construction
- Structure type: Standard (on-ground station)
- Parking: No
- Cycle facilities: No

Other information
- Status: Construction – gauge conversion
- Station code: KITN
- Zone(s): North Eastern Railway
- Division(s): Lucknow NER

Services
Preceding station	Indian Railways	Following station
Kadipur Sani Halt towards ?	North Eastern Railway zone Lucknow–Sitapur–Pilibhit metre-gauge line	Lakhimpur towards ?
Location
- Location within India Location within Uttar Pradesh

Kheri Town railway station is a small railway station in Lakhimpur Kheri district, Uttar Pradesh. Its code is KITN. It serves Kheri city. The station consists of one platform, which is not well sheltered. It lacks many facilities, including water and sanitation.
