= State Highway 26 (Uttar Pradesh) =

Road in Uttar Pradesh, India

State Highway 26

Route information
- Length: 402.03 km (249.81 mi)

Location
- Country: India
- State: Uttar Pradesh
- Primary destinations: Pilibhit, Lakhimpur, Bahraich, Basti

Highway system
- Roads in India; Expressways; National; State; Asian; State Highways in Uttar Pradesh
← SH 25	→ SH 27

Uttar Pradesh State Highway 26 (UP SH 26) passes through Pilibhit - Lakhimpur - Bahraich - Basti and covers a distance of 402.03 km.

Uttar Pradesh state in India has a series of road networks. There are 35 national highways with total length of 4635 km and 83 state highways with total length of 8,432 km (5,239 mi).

== See also ==
- State highway
- State Highway (India)
- Lakhimpur Kheri district
- Dudhwa National Park
