= Lakhimpur Assembly constituency =

Lakhimpur Assembly constituency may refer to

- Lakhimpur, Uttar Pradesh Assembly constituency
- Lakhimpur, Assam Assembly constituency
