= State Highway 57 (Uttar Pradesh) =

Road in Uttar Pradesh, India

State Highway 57

Route information
- Length: 170.3 km (105.8 mi)

Major junctions
- From: Delhi
- To: Saharanpur

Location
- Country: India
- State: Uttar Pradesh
- Primary destinations: Ghaziabad, Baghpat, Muzaffarnagar

Highway system
- Roads in India; Expressways; National; State; Asian; State Highways in Uttar Pradesh
| ← SH 37 | → SH 70 |

State Highway 57 in Uttar Pradesh is an about 170.3 km long highway from Delhi to Saharanpur.
