= Nighasan Assembly constituency =

Constituency of the Uttar Pradesh legislative assembly in India

Nighasan
- Constituency No. 138 for the Uttar Pradesh Legislative Assembly

Constituency details
- Country: India
- Region: North India
- State: Uttar Pradesh
- District: Lakhimpur Kheri
- Established: 1956
- Total electors: 320,502 (2012)
- Reservation: None

Member of Legislative Assembly
- 18th Uttar Pradesh Legislative Assembly
- Incumbent Shashank Verma
- Party: BJP

Nighasan Assembly constituency is one of the 403 constituencies of the Uttar Pradesh Legislative Assembly, India. It is a part of the Lakhimpur Kheri district and one of the five assembly constituencies in the Kheri Lok Sabha constituency. First election in this assembly constituency was held in 1957 after the "DPACO (1956)" (delimitation order) was passed in 1956. After the "Delimitation of Parliamentary and Assembly Constituencies Order" was passed in 2008, the constituency was assigned identification number 138.

== Wards / Areas ==
Extent of Nighasan Assembly constituency is Nighasan Tehsil; PCs Benoura, Mallbehar, Ram Nagar Bagha, Gulariya T. Amethi, Ramiya Behar, Sujanpur, Jungle Sujanpur, Semri, Chandpura, Sohariya, Tahara of Ramiya Behar KC & Dhaurahra NP of Dhaurahra Tehsil.

== Members of the Legislative Assembly ==
#	Term	Name	Party	From	To	Days	Comments	Ref
01	01st Vidhan Sabha	Thakur Karan Singh	Indian National Congress	Mar 1952	Mar 1957	1,849	–	
02	02nd Vidhan Sabha	Surath Bahadur Shah	Praja Socialist Party	Apr 1957	Mar 1962	1,800	–	
03	03rd Vidhan Sabha	Ram Charan Shah	Bharatiya Jana Sangh	Mar 1962	Mar 1967	1,828	–	
04	04th Vidhan Sabha	Thakur Karan Singh	Indian National Congress	Mar 1967	Apr 1968	402	–	
05	05th Vidhan Sabha	Thakur Karan Singh	Indian National Congress	Feb 1969	Mar 1974	1,832	–	
06	06th Vidhan Sabha	Ram Charan Shah	Bharatiya Jana Sangh	Mar 1974	Apr 1977	1,153	–	
07	07th Vidhan Sabha	Ram Charan Shah	Janata Party	Jun 1977	Feb 1980	969	–	
08	08th Vidhan Sabha	Satish Ajmani	Indian National Congress (Indira)	Jun 1980	Mar 1985	1,735	–	
09	09th Vidhan Sabha	Satish Ajmani	Indian National Congress	Mar 1985	Nov 1989	1,725	–	
10	10th Vidhan Sabha	Nirvendra Kumar Mishra	Independent politician	Dec 1989	Apr 1991	488	–	
11	11th Vidhan Sabha	Nirvendra Kumar Mishra	Independent politician	Jun 1991	Dec 1992	533	–	
12	12th Vidhan Sabha	Nirvendra Kumar Mishra	Samajwadi Party	Dec 1993	Oct 1995	693	–	
13	13th Vidhan Sabha	Patel Ramkumar Verma	Bharatiya Janata Party	Oct 1996	May 2002	1,967	–	
14	14th Vidhan Sabha	R. S. Kushwaha	Bahujan Samaj Party	Feb 2002	May 2007	1,902	–	
15	15th Vidhan Sabha	Krishna Gopal Patel	Samajwadi Party	May 2007	Mar 2012	1,762	–	
16	16th Vidhan Sabha	Ajay Kumar Mishra	Bharatiya Janata Party	Mar 2012	May 2014	–	–	
16	16th Vidhan Sabha	Krishna Gopal Patel	Samajwadi Party	Sep-2014	Mar-2017	-	By poll	
17	17th Vidhan Sabha	Patel Ramkumar Verma	Bharatiya Janata Party	Mar-2017	Sep- 2018 (died)			
17	17th Vidhan Sabha	Shashank Verma	Bharatiya Janata Party	May 2019	Mar 2022		By poll	
18	18th Vidhan Sabha	Shashank Verma	Bharatiya Janata Party	Mar 2022	Incumbent			

== Election result ==
=== 2027 ===
2027 Uttar Pradesh Legislative Assembly election: Nighasan
Party	Candidate	Votes	%	±%
INDIA				
NDA				
BSP				
NOTA	None of the above			
Majority				
Turnout				
gain from		Swing		

=== 2022 ===
2022 Uttar Pradesh Legislative Assembly election: Nighasan
Party	Candidate	Votes	%	±%
BJP	Shashank Verma	126,488	53.41	−0.11
SP	R. S. Kushwaha	85,479	36.1	+5.40
BSP	Rafiq Ahmed Usmani	15,392	6.5	−11.81
INC	Atal Kumar Shukla	2,762	1.17	−7.02
Jan Adhikar Party	Qamrul Huda	2,707	1.14	
NOTA	None of the above	2,191	0.93	−0.02
Majority		41,009	17.31	−5.51
Turnout		236,815	69.57	+2.71
BJP hold		Swing		

=== 2019 bypoll ===
By-Elections, 2019: Nighasan
Party	Candidate	Votes	%	±%
BJP	Shashank Verma	120,269	53.52	+5.13
SP	Mohammad Khayam	68,987	30.70	+3.08
INC	Atal Kumar Shukla	18,402	8.19	
IND	Paramjeet Singh	8,053	3.58	
SBSP	Ashrafpal Dhangar	2,531	1.13	
Rashtriya Janwadi Party (Socialist)	Amar Singh Chauhan	2,397	1.07	
None of the Above	None of the Above	2,130	0.95	−0.26
Majority		51,282	22.82	+2.05
Turnout		2,24,719	66.86	−0.97
BJP hold		Swing		

=== 2017 ===
2017 Uttar Pradesh Legislative Assembly Election: Nighasan
Party	Candidate	Votes	%	±%
BJP	Patel Ramkumar Verma	107,487	48.39	
SP	Krishna Gopal Patel	61,364	27.62	
BSP	Girjashankar Singh	40,674	18.31	
NISHAD	Radhey Shyam	2,470	1.11	
NOTA	None of the above	2,663	1.21	
Majority		46,123	20.77	
Turnout		222,147	67.83	

=== 2012 ===
2012 General Elections: Nighasan
Party	Candidate	Votes	%	±%
BJP	Ajay Kumar Mishra	75,005	36.39	−
SP	Rafiq Ahmed Usmani	43,966	21.33	−
BSP	Daroga Singh	35,798	17.37	−
	Remainder 11 candidates	51,333	24.91	−
Majority		31,039	15.06	−
Turnout		206,102	64.31	−
BJP gain from SP		Swing		

== See also ==
- Kheri Lok Sabha constituency
- Lakhimpur Kheri district
- Sixteenth Legislative Assembly of Uttar Pradesh
- Uttar Pradesh Legislative Assembly
- Vidhan Bhawan
