= Joya, India =

Joya
- City
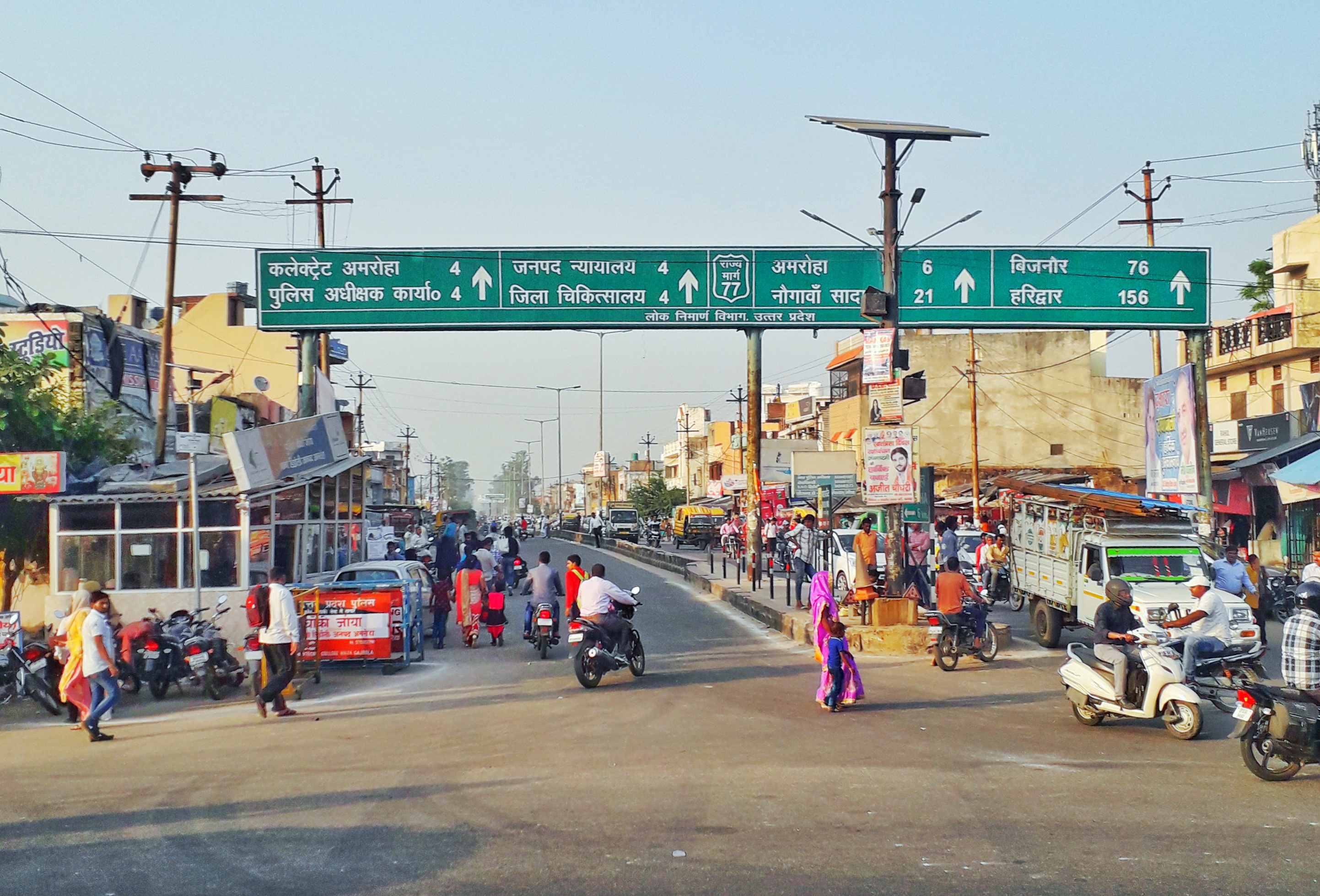
- UP SH-77 starting at Joya

- Location in Uttar Pradesh, India
- Coordinates: 28°50′N 78°28′E
- Country: India
- State: Uttar Pradesh
- District: Amroha

Government
  - Type: Nagar Panchayat (Chairman)

Population (2011)
  - Total: 18,337

Languages
  - Official: Khariboli, Haryanvi, Punjabi, Urdu, English
- Time zone: UTC+5:30 (IST)
- The Milk Producing Hub on NH-24 in Western Uttar Pradesh

Joya is a nagar panchayat located along highway NH-24 in Amroha district in the Western Uttar Pradesh in India. It is predominantly a milk-producing city. Joya was a gram panchayat before 1988. The late Abrar Hussain was the first chairman of Joya in 1988.

== Growth in development ==
The growth rate is very high for industries here, due to a well-developed infrastructure in Joya.

The Delhi–Mumbai Industrial Corridor Project is a state-sponsored industrial development project aimed at developing an industrial zone spanning across six states in India. The project will see major expansion of infrastructure and industry – including industrial clusters and rail, road, port, and air connectivity – in the states along the route of the corridor. The ambitious Delhi Mumbai Industrial Corridor (DMIC) has received major boost with India and Japan inking an agreement to set up a project development fund. The initial size of the fund will be Rs 1,000 Crore (about $212 million). Both the Japanese and Indian governments contribute equally.

The corridor would include six mega investment regions of 200 square kilometers each and will run through seven states: Delhi, western Uttar Pradesh, southern Haryana, eastern Rajasthan, eastern Gujarat, and western Maharashtra. Indrapuram-Moradabad-Kashipur-Haldwani is one of the investment regions selected for development in the first phase of the ambitious Delhi-Mumbai Industrial Corridor. More than 59 per cent of Western Uttar Pradesh's area comes under the project area of this ambitious DMIC project, which is extended up to 150 km on both sides of the alignment of the Delhi-Mumbai Dedicated Freight Corridor. This would open a floodgate of opportunities all along NH-58, NH-2, Yamuna Expressway and NH-24 for developing industrial, urban and supporting infrastructure through public-private initiatives, seven investment regions and 13 industrial areas have been planned along this Corridor and Hapur-Moradabad-Rudrapur-Khatima is one of the investment regions selected for development in the first phase. The Growth Centre Bawal has been evolved as a mega industrial hub and large numbers of multi-national companies have selected Gajraula as their manufacturing base.

== Major distances ==
- Amroha - 6 km
- Nainital - 184 km
- Moradabad - 31 km
- Noida - 127 km
- Gurgaon - 176 km
- Faridabad - 161 km
- Ghaziabad -122 km
- Meerut - 89 km
- Karnal - 194 km
- Ambala - 264 km
- Panchkula - 315 km
- Chandigarh - 334 km
- Paonta Sahib - 274 km
- Agra - 298 km
- Kanpur - 457 km
- Prayagraj - 674 km
- Lucknow - 435 km
- Nowgawan Sadat - 20 km

The above distances show that Joya is near to important areas of neighbouring states as well as its own state. Chandigarh, the capital of Punjab & Haryana, is actually closer to it than the state capital Lucknow. The demographics, language, culture, tradition and activities of this region are much different from those of eastern Uttar Pradesh. Moradabad, Rudrapur, Gajraula, Kashipur and Ghaziabad are very close to the city.

== Demographics ==
As of the 2011 India census, Joya is a Nagar Panchayat located along National Highway 24 just 128 kilometres from Delhi. Joya had a population of 18,377. Males constituted 53% of the population and females 47%. Joya's average literacy rate of 85% is higher than the national average of 74.07%: male literacy is 86%, and female literacy is 82%. In Joya, 12% of the population is under 6 years of age.

== Culture ==
=== Handicrafts ===
The handicrafts of Joya include wooden handicrafts such as wooden boxes, gift boxes, wooden utensils, wooden toys, and furniture.
