= State Highway 37 (Uttar Pradesh) =

Road in Uttar Pradesh, India

State Highway 37

Route information
- Length: 64 km (40 mi)

Major junctions
- South end: Bareilly
- North end: near Kichha (Uttarakhand)

Location
- Country: India
- State: Uttar Pradesh
- Primary destinations: Bareilly, Baheri (in Uttar Pradesh) (Kichha, Almorah, Bageshwar in Uttarakhand)

Highway system
- Roads in India; Expressways; National; State; Asian; State Highways in Uttar Pradesh
← SH 36	→ SH 57

Uttar Pradesh State Highway 37 or SH 37 (also called Nainital Road) is a State Highway in the state of Uttar Pradesh, India that connects Bareilly to Kichha, running through Baheri.

== History ==
Earlier, before the separation of Uttarakhand, the road lead up to Nainital, covering a distance of 137 km (85 Miles) via Haldwani, kathgodam and was also a part of Bareilly-Almora-Bageshwar route.

== Route ==
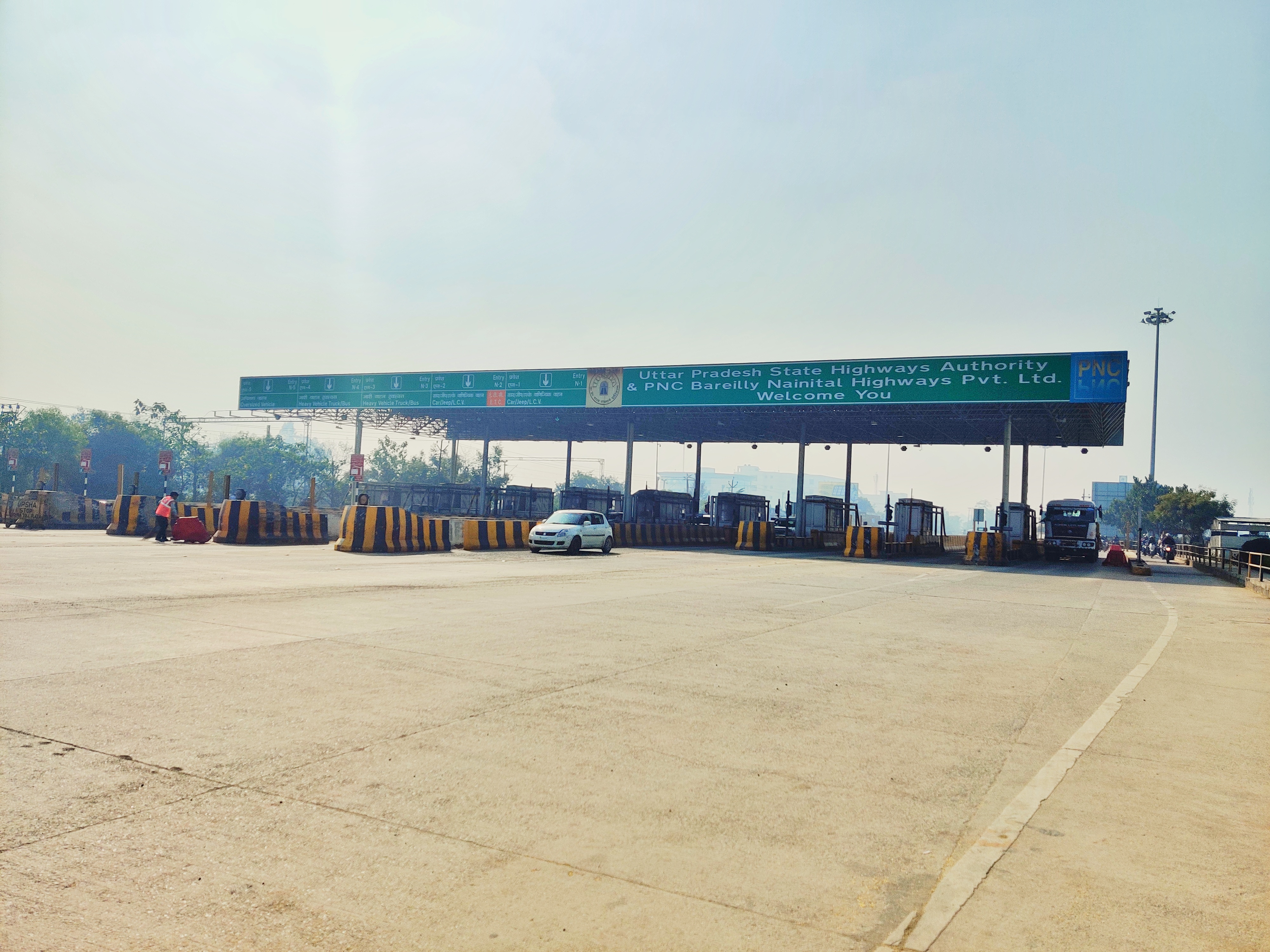
Toll Gate on the highway at Dohna, Bareilly

Uttar Pradesh State Highway 37 or Nainital Road, as it is called, starts from Kutubkhana in Bareilly and runs through 'Koharapeer Sabji-Mandi', Shrinathpuram Colony and 'Kodesia Railway Crossing' to reach Bareilly Mini Bypass (connecting it to Delhi – Lucknow National Highway 24 (India)) near Izzatnagar Railway Station.

From there the road heads northwards passing the Bareilly Airport (or Trishul Air Base) before reaching Baheri.

After reaching the border of U.P. at Kichchha, Uttar Pradesh State Highway 37 merges with National Highway 74 (India) (or Uttarakhand State Highway 49), running from Bareilly in Uttar Pradesh to Haridwar in Uttarakhand.

== Upgradation ==
A State Highway projects has been approved on public-private partnership (PPP) model which comprises construction of bypass, foot over-bridge, service lanes and elevated corridor on the entire stretch. The developers selected for this project is PNC-Infratech Ltd, Agra.

The length of road to be upgraded is 54 km long and reaches Uttarakhand border from Bareilly. It would entail an investment of Rs 354 crore. It would also include construction of a flyover.

== See also ==
- List of state highways in Uttar Pradesh
- List of national highways in India
- National Highways Development Project
