= Nirvendra Kumar Mishra =

Indian politician (died 2020)

Member of the Uttar Pradesh Legislative Assembly
- In office November 1989 – 1996
- Preceded by: Satish Ajmani
- Succeeded by: Ram Kumar Verma
- Constituency: Nighasan

Personal details
- Born: 1944 or 1945 (age 80–81)
- Died: 6 September 2020 Lakhimpur Kheri, Uttar Pradesh
- Party: Samajwadi Party
- Source UP VidhanSabha (PDF)

Nirvendra Kumar Mishra, also known as Munna, (1944/1945–2020) was an Indian politician. He was a member of the Samajwadi Party and a member of the Uttar Pradesh Legislative Assembly representing Nighasan constituency. He died on 6 September 2020 in Lakhimpur Kheri.

== Political career ==
Mishra was a three-time MLA from Nighasan Assembly seat of Lakhimpur Kheri. He won twice as an independent candidate from November 1989 to 1992 and once on Samajwadi Party ticket from 1993 to 1995.

== Death ==
Mishra was allegedly beaten to death by rivals over a property dispute on 6 September 2020 at Trikaulia Padhua locality under Sampurnanagar police station area of the Lakhimpur Kheri district. However, police said that the former MLA's body did not bear any injury marks therefore it cannot be established if he was beaten to death.
