= Krishna Gopal Patel =

Indian politician

MLA, Legislative Assembly of Uttar Pradesh
- In office September 2014 – March 2017
- Preceded by: Ajay Kumar Mishra
- Succeeded by: Patel Ramkumar Verma
- In office May 2007 – March 2012
- Preceded by: R S Kushwaha
- Succeeded by: Ajay Kumar Mishra
- Constituency: Nighasan (Assembly constituency)

Personal details
- Born: 31 August 1958 (age 68) Lakhimpur Kheri district
- Party: Samajwadi Party
- Spouse: Kanchan Bala (wife)
- Parent: Ch. Somdutt Singh(father) Smt. Kalawati (mother)
- Education: Chaudhary Charan Singh University
- Profession: Politician, businessperson & farmer

Krishna Gopal Patel is an Indian politician and a member of the Sixteenth Legislative Assembly of Uttar Pradesh in India. He represents the Nighasan constituency of Uttar Pradesh and is a member of the Samajwadi Party political party.

== Early life and education ==
Krishna Gopal Patel was born in Meerut. He attended the Chaudhary Charan Singh University and attained BA, LLB & MA degrees and later on shifted to lakhimpur kheri with his family.

== Political career ==
Krishna Gopal Patel has been a MLA for one term. He represented the Nighasan constituency and is a member of the Samajwadi Party political party. Patel was elected in the 2014 By-election after the sitting MLA Ajay Kumar Mishra was elected to the 16th Lok Sabha.

== Posts held ==
| # | From | To | Position | Comments |
|---|---|---|---|---|
| 01 | May 2007 | March 2012 | Member, 15th Legislative Assembly | |
| 02 | September 2014 | March 2017 | Member, 16th Legislative Assembly | By Poll |

== See also ==
- Nighasan (Assembly constituency)
- Sixteenth Legislative Assembly of Uttar Pradesh
- Uttar Pradesh Legislative Assembly
