= Suheli =

Suheli may refer to:

- Suheli Par, an uninhabited atoll in the Lakshadweep, India
- Suheli River, a river in Uttar Pradesh, India
