= Palia Assembly constituency =

Constituency of the Uttar Pradesh legislative assembly in India

Palia
- Constituency No. 137 for the Uttar Pradesh Legislative Assembly

Constituency details
- Country: India
- Region: North India
- State: Uttar Pradesh
- District: Lakhimpur
- Total electors: 317,617 (2012)
- Reservation: None

Member of Legislative Assembly
- 18th Uttar Pradesh Legislative Assembly
- Incumbent Harvindar Kumar Sahani
- Party: Bhartiya Janata Party
- Elected year: 2017

Palia Assembly constituency is one of the 403 constituencies of the Uttar Pradesh Legislative Assembly, India. It is a part of the Lakhimpur district and one of the five assembly constituencies in the Kheri Lok Sabha constituency. First election in this assembly constituency was held in 1962 after the "DPACO (1961)" (delimitation order) was passed in 1961. After the "Delimitation of Parliamentary and Assembly Constituencies Order" was passed in 2008, the constituency was assigned identification number 137.

== Wards / Areas ==
Extent of Palia Assembly constituency is Palia Tehsil; KC Kukra & Forest Area of Gola Gokrannath Tehsil.

== Members of the Legislative Assembly ==
#	Term	Name	Party	From	To	Days	Comments	Ref
01	01st Vidhan Sabha	-	-	Mar-1952	Mar-1957	1,849	Constituency not in existence	
02	02nd Vidhan Sabha	-	-	Apr-1957	Mar-1962	1,800	Constituency not in existence	
03	03rd Vidhan Sabha	Chheda Lal Chaudhary	Indian National Congress	Mar-1962	Mar-1967	1,828	-	
04	04th Vidhan Sabha	-	-	Mar-1967	Apr-1968	402	Constituency not in existence	
05	05th Vidhan Sabha	-	-	Feb-1969	Mar-1974	1,832	Constituency not in existence	
06	06th Vidhan Sabha	Chheda Lal Chaudhary	Indian National Congress	Mar-1974	Apr-1977	1,153	-	
07	07th Vidhan Sabha	Nanga Ram	Janata Party	Jun-1977	Feb-1980	969	-	
08	08th Vidhan Sabha	Chheda Lal Chaudhary	Indian National Congress (I)	Jun-1980	Mar-1985	1,735	-	
09	09th Vidhan Sabha	Nanga Ram	Lok Dal	Mar-1985	Nov-1989	1,725	-	
10	10th Vidhan Sabha	Chheda Lal Chaudhary	Indian National Congress	Dec-1989	Apr-1991	488	-	
11	11th Vidhan Sabha	Ram Saran	Janata Dal	Jun-1991	Dec-1992	533	-	
12	12th Vidhan Sabha	Shashi Bala Bharti	Bharatiya Janata Party	Dec-1993	Oct-1995	693	-	
13	13th Vidhan Sabha	Moti Lal	Samajwadi Party	Oct-1996	May-2002	1,967	-	
14	14th Vidhan Sabha	Rajesh Kumar	Bahujan Samaj Party	Feb-2002	May-2007	1,902	-	
15	15th Vidhan Sabha	Rajesh Kumar	Bahujan Samaj Party	May-2007	Mar-2012	1,762	-	
16	16th Vidhan Sabha	Harvindar Kumar Sahani	Bahujan Samaj Party	Mar-2012	Mar 2017	1,805	-	
17	17th Vidhan Sabha	Harvindar Kumar Sahani	Bhartiya Janta Party	Mar 2017	Mar 2022	-	-	
18	18th Vidhan Sabha	Harvindar Kumar Sahani	Bhartiya Janta Party	Mar 2022	Incumbent			

== Election result ==
=== 2027 ===
2027 Uttar Pradesh Legislative Assembly election: Palia
Party	Candidate	Votes	%	±%
INDIA				
NDA				
BSP				
NOTA	None of the above			
Majority				
Turnout				
gain from		Swing		

2012 General Elections: Palia
Party	Candidate	Votes	%	±%
BSP	Harvindar Kumar Sahani	55,460	27.29	−
SP	Krishna Gopal Patel	49,541	24.37	−
INC	Vinod Tiwari	23,500	11.56	−
	Remainder 18 candidates	74,753	36.78	−
Majority		5,919	2.91	−
Turnout		203,254	63.99	−
BSP hold		Swing		

=== 2022 ===
2022 Uttar Pradesh Legislative Assembly Election: Palia
Party	Candidate	Votes	%	±%
BJP	Harvindar Kumar Sahani	118,864	50.2	−0.74
SP	Pritinder Singh	80,735	34.1	
BSP	Dr. Zakir Hussain	27,849	11.76	−6.98
INC	Rizhal Ahamed	4,514	1.91	−19.16
NOTA	None of the above	2,010	0.85	−0.05
Majority		38,129	16.1	−13.77
Turnout		236,794	65.68	−2.34
BJP hold		Swing		

=== 2017 ===
2017 Uttar Pradesh Legislative Assembly Election: Palia
Party	Candidate	Votes	%	±%
BJP	Harvinder Kumar Sahani	118,069	50.94	
INC	Saif Ali Naqvi	48,841	21.07	
BSP	Virendra Kumar Agarwal	43,436	18.74	
Rashtriya Kisan Majdoor Party	Ramnaresh	7,795	3.36	
NOTA	None of the above	2,077	0.9	
Majority		69,228	29.87	
Turnout		231,799	68.02	

== See also ==
- Kheri Lok Sabha constituency
- Lakhimpur Kheri district
- Sixteenth Legislative Assembly of Uttar Pradesh
- Uttar Pradesh Legislative Assembly
- Vidhan Bhawan
