= Gola Gokrannath Assembly constituency =

Constituency of the Uttar Pradesh legislative assembly in India

Gola Gokarannath गोला गोकर्णनाथ
- Constituency No. 139 for the Uttar Pradesh Legislative Assembly

Constituency details
- Country: India
- Region: North India
- State: Uttar Pradesh
- District: Lakhimpur
- Total electors: 344,128 (2012)
- Reservation: None

Member of Legislative Assembly
- 18th Uttar Pradesh Legislative Assembly
- Incumbent Aman Giri
- Party: Bharatiya Janata Party
- Elected year: 2022

Gola Gokrannath Assembly constituency is one of the 403 constituencies of the Uttar Pradesh Legislative Assembly, India. It is a part of the Lakhimpur district and one of the five assembly constituencies in the Kheri Lok Sabha constituency. The first election in this assembly constituency was held in 2012 after the "Delimitation of Parliamentary and Assembly Constituencies Order, 2008" was passed and the constituency was formed in 2008. The constituency is assigned identification number 139.

== Wards / Areas ==
The extent of Gola Gokrannath Assembly constituency is KCs Aliganj, Haiderabad, Daudpur, Gola Gokarannath MB & Mailani NP of Gola Gokrannath Tehsil.

== Members of the Legislative Assembly ==
Year	Member	Party
2017	Arvind Giri	Bharatiya Janata Party
2022	Arvind Giri	Bharatiya Janata Party
2022^	Aman Giri	Bharatiya Janata Party

^ bypoll

== Election results ==
=== 2027 ===
2027 Uttar Pradesh Legislative Assembly election: Gola Gokrannath
Party	Candidate	Votes	%	±%
INDIA				
NDA				
BSP				
NOTA	None of the above			
Majority				
Turnout				
gain from		Swing		

=== 2022 bypoll ===
Bye-election, 2022: Gola Gokrannath
Party	Candidate	Votes	%	±%
BJP	Aman Giri	1,24,810	55.88	+7%
SP	Vinay Tiwari	90,542	40.52	+3
NOTA	None of the above			
Majority		34,310	+7	
Turnout		2,23,352	56.97	
BJP hold		Swing		

=== 2022 ===
2022 Uttar Pradesh Legislative Assembly election: Gola Gokrannath
Party	Candidate	Votes	%	±%
BJP	Arvind Giri	126,534	48.67	▼0.16
SP	Vinay Tiwari	97,240	37.4	▲10.5
BSP	Patel Shikha Kanaujiya	26,970	10.37	▼10.18
INC	Prahlad Patel	3,513	1.35	
NOTA	None of the above	1,973	0.76	▼0.46
Majority		29,294	11.27	▼10.66
Turnout		259,993	65.62	▼2.96
BJP hold		Swing		

=== 2017 ===
17th Vidhan Sabha: 2017 General Elections

2017 General Elections: Gola Gokrannath
Party	Candidate	Votes	%	±%
BJP	Arvind Giri	122,497	48.83	
SP	Vinay Tiwari	67,480	26.9	
BSP	Brij Swaroop Kanaujia	51,542	20.55	
NOTA	None of the above	3,022	1.22	
Majority		55,017	21.93	
Turnout		250,840	68.58	
BJP gain from SP		Swing		

=== 2012 ===
2012 General Elections: Gola Gokrannath
Party	Candidate	Votes	%	±%
SP	Vinay Tiwari	82,439	37.04	−
BSP	Shamim Bano	67,480	30.32	−

== See also ==
- Kheri Lok Sabha constituency
- Lakhimpur Kheri district
- Sixteenth Legislative Assembly of Uttar Pradesh
- Uttar Pradesh Legislative Assembly
- Vidhan Bhawan
