= Saiyid Khurd =

Indian Muslim

- Died: 1563; Lakhimpur Kheri, India

Saiyid Khurd was an Indian Muslim who lived in Kheri, Uttar Pradesh, India in the 15th century. His tomb is present in the town. It is being said that Kheri derived its name from Saiyid Khurd.
