= Yogesh Verma =

Indian politician

Member of the Uttar Pradesh legislative assembly
- Incumbent
- Assumed office 2017
- Preceded by: Utkarsh Verma
- Constituency: Lakhimpur

Personal details
- Born: 10 March 1973 (age 53) Lakhimpur, Uttar Pradesh
- Party: Bharatiya Janata Party
- Spouse: Neelam Verma (m. 1995)
- Children: 2
- Parent: Bal Govind Verma (father)
- Education: Post Graduate
- Profession: Agriculture
- Source

Yogesh Verma (born 10 March 1973) is an Indian politician, member of the 17th Uttar Pradesh Assembly, and Y.D.P.G. student. He represents the Lakhimpur constituency in Uttar Pradesh.

== Political career ==
Yogesh Verma contested Uttar Pradesh Assembly Election as Bharatiya Janata Party candidate and defeated his close contestant Utkarsh Verma from Samajwadi Party with a margin of 37,748 votes.

== Posts held ==
#	From	To	Position	Comments
01	2017	Incumbent	Member, 17th Legislative Assembly	
