= Arvind Giri =

Indian politician (1958–2022)

Member of the Uttar Pradesh legislative assembly
- In office 19 March 2017 – 6 September 2022
- Succeeded by: Aman Giri
- Constituency: Gola Gokrannath Assembly constituency

Personal details
- Born: 30 June 1958 Gola Gokarannath, Uttar Pradesh, India
- Died: 6 September 2022 (aged 64) Sitapur, Uttar Pradesh, India
- Party: Bharatiya Janata Party
- Children: Aman Giri (son)
- Parent: Mr. Rajendra Giri
- Occupation: MLA
- Profession: Politician

Arvind Giri (30 June 1958 – 6 September 2022) was an Indian politician. He was a five time member of Legislative Assembly and a runner up in Loksabha election in 2014, Uttar Pradesh of India. He represented the Gola Gokrannath Assembly constituency in Gola Gokarannath, Lakhimpur district of Uttar Pradesh.

== Political career ==
Giri contested 2017 Uttar Pradesh Legislative Assembly election as Bharatiya Janata Party candidate from Gola Gokrannath Assembly constituency and defeated his close contestant Vinay Tiwari from Samajwadi Party with a margin of 55,017 votes.

From 19 March 2017 to 10 March 2022 he was a member of the 17th Legislative Assembly of Uttar Pradesh.

From 12 March 2022 to 6 September 2022 he was a member of the 18th Legislative Assembly of Uttar Pradesh.

== Death ==
Giri died of heart attack on 6 September 2022, at the age of 64.
