= Patel Ramkumar Verma =

Indian politician

MLA, 17th Legislative Assembly
- In office 2017 – 2018 (died)
- Constituency: Nighasan, Lakhimpur, Uttar Pradesh

Personal details
- Died: 30 September 2018 (aged 64) Lucknow
- Party: Bharatiya Janata Party
- Occupation: MLA
- Profession: Politician

Patel Ramkumar Verma (1954–2018) was an Indian politician and a member of Uttar Pradesh Assembly in India in 2017. He represented the Nighasan (Assembly constituency) in Lakhimpur district of Uttar Pradesh. He died at the age of 64 after suffering from prolonged illness in Lucknow Uttar Pradesh. Patel was the PWD (Public Works Department) minister in 1991 and cooperative minister in 1997 in U.P.

== Political career ==
Patel Ramkumar Verma contested Uttar Pradesh Assembly Election in 2017 as Bharatiya Janata Party candidate and defeated his close contestant Krishna Gopal Patel from Samajwadi Party with a margin of 46,123 votes. When the seat fell vacant because of his death in 2018, his son Shashank Verma won the by-election in 2019 as BJP's candidate.

He was born to Devi Din Verma on 20 October 1954 in a Kurmi family.

== Posts held ==
#	From	To	Position	Comments
01	2017	2018	Member, 17th Legislative Assembly	Died
