= State Highway 25 (Uttar Pradesh) =

Road in Uttar Pradesh, India

State Highway 25

Route information
- Length: 265.50 km (164.97 mi)

Location
- Country: India
- States: Uttar Pradesh: 265.50 km (164.97 mi)
- Primary destinations: Palia (Lakhimpur)-Lucknow

Highway system
- Roads in India; Expressways; National; State; Asian

Uttar Pradesh State Highway 25 (UP SH 25) starts from Palia (Lakhimpur) and goes to Lucknow and covers a distance of 265.50 km.

Uttar Pradesh state in India has a series of road networks. There are 35 national highways with total length of 4635 km and 83 state highways with total length of 8,432 km (5,239 mi).

== See also ==
- State highway
- State Highway (India)
- Lakhimpur Kheri district
- Dudhwa National Park
