= Aman Giri =

Indian politician (born 1996)

Member of the Uttar Pradesh Legislative Assembly
- Incumbent
- Assumed office 6 November 2022
- Preceded by: Arvind Giri
- Constituency: Gola Gokrannath

Personal details
- Born: 1 June 1996 Gola Gokarannath, Uttar Pradesh, India
- Party: Bharatiya Janata Party
- Parent: Late. Arvind Giri
- Occupation: MLA
- Profession: Politician

Aman Giri (Hindi: अमन गिरी) (born 1 June 1996) is an Indian politician and currently serving MLA from the 16th Legislative Assembly. He represented the Gola Gokrannath Assembly constituency in Gola Gokarannath, Lakhimpur district of Uttar Pradesh.

== Political career ==
Giri contested 2022 Uttar Pradesh Legislative Assembly election as Bharatiya Janata Party candidate from Gola Gokrannath Assembly constituency and defeated his close contestant Vinay Tiwari from Samajwadi Party with a margin of 35500 votes. From 6 November 2022 he has become member of the 18th Legislative Assembly of Uttar Pradesh.

== Posts held ==
#	From	To	Position	Comments
01	2022	Incumbent	Member, 18th Legislative Assembly of Uttar Pradesh	Elected in Bypoll
