= Vinay Tiwari =

Indian politician (born 1969)

MLA, 16th Legislative Assembly
- In office March 2012 – March 2017
- Preceded by: None
- Succeeded by: Arvind Giri
- Constituency: Gola Gokrannath

Personal details
- Born: 14 December 1969 (age 56) Lakhimpur Kheri district
- Party: Samajwadi Party
- Spouse: Rekha Tiwari (wife)
- Children: 3
- Parent: Kanhiyalal Tiwari (father)
- Education: Public Inter College, Gola Gokas Nath
- Profession: Politician and farmer

Vinay Tiwari is an Indian politician and a member of the Sixteenth Legislative Assembly of Uttar Pradesh in India. He represents the Gola Gokrannath constituency of Uttar Pradesh and is a member of the Samajwadi Party political party.

== Early life and education ==
Vinay Tiwari was born in Lakhimpur Kheri district. He attended the Public Inter College in Gola Gokaran Nath and is educated till twelfth grade.

== Political career ==
Vinay Tiwari has been a MLA for one term. He represented the Gola Gokrannath constituency and is a member of the Samajwadi Party political party.

He lost his seat in the 2017 and the 2022 Uttar Pradesh Assembly election to Arvind Giri of the Bharatiya Janata Party. He lost the seat to Aman Giri in the by election held after the demise of Arvind Giri in 2022.

== Posts held ==
#	From	To	Position	Comments
01	2012	2017	Member, 16th Legislative Assembly	

== See also ==
- Gola Gokrannath (Assembly constituency)
- Sixteenth Legislative Assembly of Uttar Pradesh
- Uttar Pradesh Legislative Assembly
