= R. S. Kushwaha =

Indian politician

- आर. एस. कुशवाहा
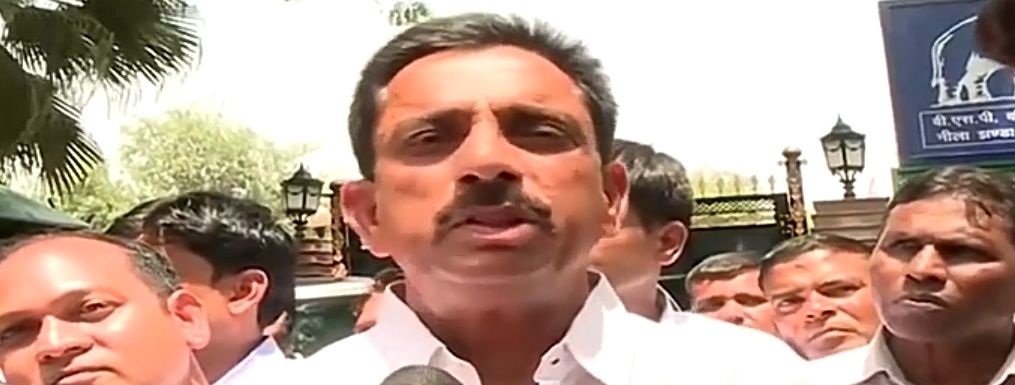

Samajwadi Party Uttar Pradesh

MLC, Uttar Pradesh Legislative Council
- In office 2010–2016
- Preceded by: Dhirendra Pratap Singh
- Succeeded by: Shashank Yadav
- Constituency: Lakhimpur Kheri District

MLA, 14th Legislative Assembly
- In office March 2002 – May 2007
- Preceded by: Ram Kumar verma
- Succeeded by: Krishna Gopal Patel
- Constituency: Nighasan (Assembly constituency)

President of Bahujan Samaj Party, Uttar Pradesh
- In office 7 January 2017 – 8 August 2019
- President: Mayawati
- Preceded by: Ram Achal Rajbhar
- Succeeded by: Munquad Ali

Personal details
- Party: Samajwadi Party
- Spouse: Beena Kushwaha (wife)
- Children: 2 sons and 1 daughter
- Profession: Politician

R. S. Kushwaha is an Indian politician from the Lakhimpur constituency of Uttar Pradesh. R. S. Kushwaha is currently a member of the Samajwadi Party (SP) and has previously held the post of the national general secretary of Bahujan Samaj Party (BSP). He has also served as the president of the Uttar Pradesh state unit of the party during the time of Alliance between Samajwadi Party and Bahujan Samaj Party. He joined SP in October 2021. He was the member of the 14th Legislative Assembly of Uttar Pradesh and a member of Uttar Pradesh Legislative Assembly from 2010 to 2016. He also contested the 15th Lok Sabha Elections against former Congress chief Sonia Gandhi from Rae Bareli constituency.

== Posts Held ==
#	From	To	Position	Comments
01	2002	2007	Member, 14h Legislative Assembly	
02	2007	2010	Minister of state in the government of Uttar Pradesh	
03	2010	2016	Member, Uttar Pradesh Legislative Council	

== See also ==
- Nighasan (Assembly constituency)
- Uttar Pradesh Legislative Assembly
- Uttar Pradesh Legislative Council
- Bahujan Samaj Party
