= Ajay Mishra Teni =

Indian Minister of State for Home Affairs (born 1960)

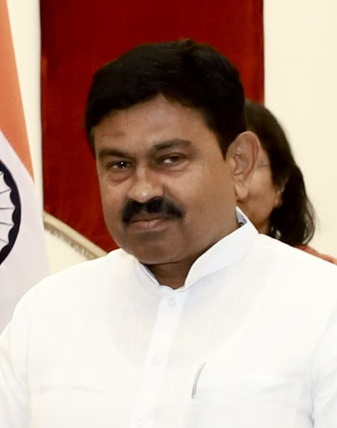
- Teni in 2023

Minister of State for Home Affairs
- In office 8 July 2021 – 11 June 2024; Serving with Nityanand Rai and N. Pramanik
- Prime Minister: Narendra Modi
- Minister: Amit Shah
- Preceded by: G. Kishan Reddy

Member of Parliament, Lok Sabha
- In office 16 May 2014 – 4 June 2024
- Preceded by: Zafar Ali Naqvi
- Succeeded by: Utkarsh Verma
- Constituency: Kheri

MLA, 16th Legislative Assembly
- In office March 2012 – May 2014
- Preceded by: Krishna Gopal Patel
- Succeeded by: Krishna Gopal Patel
- Constituency: Nighasan (Assembly constituency)

Personal details
- Born: 25 September 1960 (age 66) Lakhimpur Kheri district
- Party: Bharatiya Janata Party
- Spouse: Pushpa Mishra
- Children: 3 (Ashish Mishra, 1 other son, and 1 daughter)
- Parent: Ambika Prasad Mishra (father)
- Education: Kanpur University's Christ Church College, Kanpur (B.Sc.); DAV College, Kanpur (LLB)
- Profession: Politician and businessperson

Ajay Mishra Teni (born 25 September 1960) is an Indian politician, strongman and former Member of Parliament in the 17th Lok Sabha. He is the former Minister of State in Ministry of Home affairs, Government of India. He represents the Kheri constituency of Uttar Pradesh and is a member of the Bharatiya Janata Party political party.

== Early life and education ==
Mishra was born in Banveerpur village in Lakhimpur Kheri district to a Brahmin family of immense local influence. His father and grandfather allegedly were part of the land mafia and involved in illegal felling of trees. He attended the Chhatrapati Shahu Ji Maharaj University's Christ Church College, Kanpur and DAV College, Kanpur and received Bachelor of Science and Bachelor of Laws degrees.

== Political career ==
In 2012, Mishra was elected as MLA in the 16th Legislative Assembly of Uttar Pradesh from Nighasan. Mishra has won the Lok Sabha elections from Kheri constituency in 2014 and 2019, as a member of Bharatiya Janata Party.

In September 2014, he was appointed a Member of the Standing Committee on Rural Development. In July 2021, he became Minister of State in the Ministry Of Home Affairs in the Second Modi ministry after the Cabinet reshuffle.

== Criminal cases ==
=== 1990s ===
In the year 1990, a criminal case was registered against Mishra under Indian Penal Code (IPC) sections 323 (punishment for voluntarily causing hurt), 324 (voluntarily causing hurt by dangerous weapons or means) and 504 (intentional insult with intent to provoke breach of the peace).

In 1996, Mishra was named a 'history-sheeter' in the records at Tikonia police station. After a few months, the sheet was closed.

=== Prabhat Gupta murder case ===
In 2000, in the Tikonia area of Lakhimpur Kheri district, 23-year-old Prabhat Gupta was shot dead. Mishra was named in the FIR of the case. Mishra was fired upon during the hearing of this case, thus injuring him. The shooter managed to escape successfully and was never identified.

Mishra was acquitted in 2004. The victim's family have filed an appeal against the acquittal in the Allahabad High Court. The appeal case is ongoing. This case that included a serious charge of murder under IPC section 302, was disclosed by Mishra in his election affidavit submitted to the Election commission before the 2014 Lok Sabha election.

=== 2005 ===
In an election affidavit submitted to the Election commission before the 2012 UP assembly election Mishra had declared a criminal case as "Crime no. 92/2005, Case No. 3592/07, 3593/07, court taken cognizance". Mishra was charged with five sections of the Indian Penal Code (IPC) 147 (punishment for rioting), 323 (voluntarily causing hurt), 504 (intentional insult with intent to provoke breach of the peace), 506 (criminal intimidation), and 452 (House-trespass after preparation for hurt, assault or wrongful restraint).

== Lakhimpur Kheri violence ==
The 2020–2021 Indian farmers' protest was organised against three farm acts which were passed by the BJP-led Union Government in the BJP controlled Parliament of India in September 2020.

In September 2021, Teni was attending an event in the Palia town of the Lakhimpur Kheri district. During the event, the farmers had shown black flags as a sign of protest. Teni had threatened the farmers in his speech saying, "Sudhar jao, nahi toh hum aapko sudhaar denge, do minute lagega keval" (You better mend your ways, or we will teach you a lesson, it will only take a couple of minutes.) Tajinder Singh Virk, a farmer leader, later organised a protest against Teni's upcoming visit, in response to this threat. On 3 October, BJP leaders Teni and Keshav Prasad Maurya had planned to attend an event in the area.

On 3 October 2021, Ajay Kumar Mishra's son, Ashish Mishra, allegedly ran his car over farmers protesting in Lakhimpur Kheri. Farmer groups alleged that at least four farmers and a journalist were killed and several others injured, after they were deliberately run over by a car that was part of the convoy of Union Minister of State for Home Affairs and BJP MP Ajay Kumar Mishra. Three members of the Minister’s convoy were killed in the mob lynching by the protesting farmers following the car-ramming incident. Eight people died and more than ten were injured. Ajay Kumar Mishra's son, Ashish Mishra, denied the charge and tried to evade police questioning. The Indian Supreme court expressed its displeasure against the lack of action against the accused in the case. After this, he was interrogated, and arrested by Uttar Pradesh Police on 9 October 2021.

On 15 December 2021, on being questioned about his son's involvement in the incident and new charges being recommended against his son, Ajay Mishra hurled abuses at reporters and reportedly lunged at a journalist. He further demanded that they stop filming and recording him.

=== Call to removal from Home ministry post ===
On 26 November 2021 the Delhi Legislative Assembly passed a resolution demanding the sacking of MoS Ajay Misra from his post of Minister of State.

Several opposition leaders and farmer groups have questioned why Teni has not been removed from his post and asked PM Modi to sack Teni; while others have also demanded his arrest. Modi has not responded to these calls. On 8 November, a lawyer through his submission, informed the Supreme court that the accused of Lakhimpur Kheri incident were "at large roaming scot-free" as they "wielded the thunderbolt of police power through political clout." (Note: Ajay Mishra Teni holds the post of the minister of state for Home Affairs in Narendra Modi cabinet. The Home Ministry is the cadre controlling authority for the Indian Police Service.)
