= Zafar Ali Naqvi =

Indian politician

Member of Parliament, Lok Sabha
- In office 2009-2014
- Preceded by: Ravi Prakash Verma
- Succeeded by: Ajay Kumar Mishra
- Constituency: Kheri

Personal details
- Born: 24 April 1948 (age 78) Lakhimpur, United Provinces, India
- Party: Indian National Congress
- Spouse: Shahnaz Naqvi
- Children: 2
- Education: University of Lucknow
- As of 17 May, 2009

Zafar Ali Naqvi (born 24 April 1948) is an Indian politician and former Member of parliament, Lok Sabha, from Lakhimpur Kheri constituency. His political party is the Indian National Congress. He was also cabinet minister for Home and Environment in U.P. Government.

== Biography ==
=== Early life ===
Zafar is a member of the Naqvi family, one of the richest and most prominent families in Lakhimpur.

=== Education and early career ===
Zafar Ali Naqvi has done his schooling from Sitapur and attended the University of Lucknow and holds the degrees Bachelor of Arts (B.A.) and Bachelor of Laws (LL.B).

Previously he has represented Lakhimpur Assembly Constituency, twice, in 1980 and 1989.

== Political career ==
Zafar Ali Naqvi is the Chairman of Standing Committee of National Monitoring Committee for Minorities Education. He has previously held the responsibilities of Chairman of Minorities Commission, Delhi.

Zafar is a former Home Minister of Uttar Pradesh.

In the 2009 Parliamentary Elections, he has closely defeated Iliyas Azmi of Bahujan Samaj Party, with a margin of 8,780 securing a total of 184,980 votes.

He was a prominent figure in a high-profile Congress campaign in Uttar Pradesh for the Indian general election, 2009. Congress won 21 seats in Uttar Pradesh mainly because of the efforts of Rahul Gandhi and Priyanka Gandhi in the state. The election saw the Indian National Congress become the majority stake holder in Parliament.

Senior Congress leaders such as Sonia Gandhi, Digvijay Singh have raised calls for Zafar Ali Naqvi to be the candidate in 2009 elections.

His supporters claim that Zafar's promise of getting the Meter gauge railway track of the district converted to Broad gauge was delivered in mere 22 months of his becoming the MP. But the fact remains that the conversion of the gauge started after Narendra Modi became the PM and started the conversion of the gauge everywhere in India. The work is still not complete as of March 2019.

== Personal life ==
Zafar's spouse, Shahnaz Naqvi is from Kanpur. He has two sons- elder son Monis is a pilot and younger son Saif Ali Naqvi is a politician of INC. He has been the life member of International Film And Television Club of Asian Academy of Film & Television.

== See also ==
- Indian National Congress
- Lakhimpur Kheri district
- University of Lucknow

Lok Sabha
Preceded by Ravi Prakash Verma	Member for Lakhimpur Kheri; 2009 – 2014	Incumbent
