= Lakhimpur, Uttar Pradesh Assembly constituency =

Constituency of the Uttar Pradesh legislative assembly in India

Lakhimpur
- Constituency No. 142 for the Uttar Pradesh Legislative Assembly

Constituency details
- Country: India
- Region: North India
- State: Uttar Pradesh
- District: Lakhimpur
- Total electors: 367,497 (2012)
- Reservation: None

Member of Legislative Assembly
- 18th Uttar Pradesh Legislative Assembly
- Incumbent Yogesh Verma
- Party: Bhartiya Janta Party
- Elected year: 2017

Lakhimpur Assembly constituency is one of the 403 constituencies of the Uttar Pradesh Legislative Assembly, India. It is a part of the Lakhimpur district and one of the five assembly constituencies in the Kheri Lok Sabha constituency. First election in this assembly constituency was held in 1952 after the "DPACO (1951)" (delimitation order) was passed in 1951. After the "Delimitation of Parliamentary and Assembly Constituencies Order" was passed in 2008, the constituency was assigned identification number 142.

== Wards / Areas ==
Extent of Lakhimpur Assembly constituency is KCs Kheri, Kheri Sri Nagar, Lakhimpur MB, Oel Dhakhawa NP & Kheri NP of Lakhimpur Tehsil.

== Members of the Legislative Assembly ==
From	Term	Name	Party	Comments	Ref
Mar-1952	01st Vidhan Sabha	Banshi Dhar Mishra	Indian National Congress		
Apr-1957	02nd Vidhan Sabha	-		Constituency not in existence	
Mar-1962	03rd Vidhan Sabha	-		Constituency not in existence	
Mar-1967	04th Vidhan Sabha	C. R. Verma	Bharatiya Jana Sangh	-	
Feb-1969	05th Vidhan Sabha	Tej Narain Trivedi	Indian National Congress	-	
Mar-1974	06th Vidhan Sabha	Tej Narain Trivedi	Indian National Congress	-	
Jun-1977	07th Vidhan Sabha	Naresh Chandra	Janata Party	-	
Jun-1980	08th Vidhan Sabha	Zafar Ali Naqvi	Indian National Congress (I)	-	
Mar-1985	09th Vidhan Sabha	Kanti Singh Visen	Indian National Congress	-	
Dec-1989	10th Vidhan Sabha	Zafar Ali Naqvi	Indian National Congress	-	
Jun-1991	11th Vidhan Sabha	Ram Gopal	Bharatiya Janata Party	-	
Dec-1993	12th Vidhan Sabha	Ram Gopal	Bharatiya Janata Party	-	
Oct-1996	13th Vidhan Sabha	Kaushal Kishore	Samajwadi Party	-	
Feb-2002	14th Vidhan Sabha	Kaushal Kishore	Samajwadi Party	-	
May-2007	15th Vidhan Sabha	Kaushal Kishore	Samajwadi Party	-	
Nov-2010	15th Vidhan Sabha	Utkarsh Verma	Samajwadi Party	Elected during by-election	
Mar-2012	16th Vidhan Sabha	Utkarsh Verma	Samajwadi Party	-	
Mar-2017	17th Vidhan Sabha	Yogesh Verma	Bharatiya Janata Party	-	
Mar-2022	18th Vidhan sabha	Yogesh Verma	Bhartiya Janata Party	-	

== Election result ==
=== 2027 ===
2027 Uttar Pradesh Legislative Assembly election: Lakhimpur
Party	Candidate	Votes	%	±%
INDIA				
NDA				
BSP				
NOTA	None of the above			
Majority				
Turnout				
gain from		Swing		

2012 General Elections:Lakhimpur
Party	Candidate	Votes	%	±%
SP	Utkarsh Verma	82,713	38.65	−
BSP	Gyanprakash Bajpai	44,720	20.9	−
PECP	Yogesh Verma	42,105	19.67	−
	Remainder 8 candidates	44,483	20.79	−
Majority		37,993	17.75	−
Turnout		214,021	58.24	−
SP hold		Swing		

=== 2022 ===
2022 Uttar Pradesh Legislative Assembly Election: Lakhimpur
Party	Candidate	Votes	%	±%
BJP	Yogesh Verma	127,663	47.38	−0.61
SP	Utkarsh Verma	107,085	39.74	+6.52
BSP	Mohan Bajpai	24,014	8.91	−6.37
INC	Dr. Ravishankar Trivedi	2,834	1.05	
NOTA	None of the above	2,049	0.76	−0.2
Majority		20,578	7.64	−7.13
Turnout		269,472	65.44	+0.47
BJP hold		Swing		

=== 2017 ===
2017 Uttar Pradesh Legislative Assembly Election: Lakhimpur
Party	Candidate	Votes	%	±%
BJP	Yogesh Verma	122,677	47.99	
SP	Utkarsh Verma	84,929	33.22	
BSP	Shashidhar Mishra	39,068	15.28	
NOTA	None of the above	2,434	0.96	
Majority		37,748	14.77	
Turnout		255,622	64.97	

== See also ==
- Kheri Lok Sabha constituency
- Lakhimpur Kheri district
- Sixteenth Legislative Assembly of Uttar Pradesh
- Uttar Pradesh Legislative Assembly
- Vidhan Bhawan
