= Shashank Verma =

Indian Bharatiya Janata Party politician

Member of Uttar Pradesh Legislative Assembly
- Incumbent
- Assumed office 2019
- Preceded by: Patel Ramkumar Verma
- Constituency: Nighasan (Kheri)

Personal details
- Born: Shashank Verma
- Party: Bharatiya Janata Party

Shashank Verma is an Indian politician. He was elected to the Uttar Pradesh Legislative Assembly from Nighasan (Kheri) in the by-election in 2019 as a member of the Bharatiya Janata Party. The by-election was held because the sitting MLA Patel Ramkumar Verma, Shashank Verma's father, had died in 2018.
