= Utkarsh Verma =

Indian politician

Member of Parliament, Lok Sabha
- Incumbent
- Assumed office 4 June 2024
- Preceded by: Ajay Mishra Teni
- Constituency: Kheri

Member of Legislative Assembly, Uttar Pradesh
- In office November 2010 – 2017
- Succeeded by: Yogesh Verma
- Constituency: Lakhimpur

Personal details
- Born: 1 November 1985 (age 40) Lakhimpur Kheri, Uttar Pradesh, India
- Party: Samajwadi Party
- Spouse: Avantika Singh
- Parent: Late. Dhirendra Kumar Verma (father)
- Education: Institute of Technology and Science
- Profession: Politician & farmer
- Nickname: Madhur

Utkarsh Verma 'Madhur' (Hindi: उत्कर्ष वर्मा 'मधुर') is an Indian politician and currently serving Member of Parliament, Lok Sabha from the 28 Lok sabha Kheri. He was formerly member of the 16th Legislative Assembly of Uttar Pradesh Legislative Assembly. He represents the 142 Lakhimpur Sadar constituency of Uttar Pradesh and he is a member of the Samajwadi Party. He is kurmi. He won his first Assembly election at the age of just 25, and became India's youngest MLA in the year of 2010.

== Early life and education ==
Utkarsh Verma was born in Lakhimpur Kheri district. He attended the ITS Engineering College and completed PGDM course.

== Political career ==
Utkarsh Verma has been a MLA for one term. He represented the Lakhimpur constituency and is a member of the Samajwadi Party political party. Utkarsh Verma was elected to the Vidhansabha from Lakhimpur Sadar in a by-election of 2010 and retained his seat in 2012.

== Posts held ==
#	From	To	Position	Comments
01	2010	2012	Member, 15th Legislative Assembly	
02	2012	2017	Member, 16th Legislative Assembly	
03	2024	Present	Member of Parliament, 18th Lok Sabha	

== See also ==
- Lakhimpur (Assembly constituency)
- Sixteenth Legislative Assembly of Uttar Pradesh
- Uttar Pradesh Legislative Assembly
