= State Highway 70 (Uttar Pradesh) =

Road in Uttar Pradesh, India

State Highway 70

Route information
- Length: 30.68 km (19.06 mi)

Major junctions
- From: UP State Border
- To: Jalaun SH21

Location
- Country: India
- States: Uttar Pradesh: 30.68 km (19.06 mi)

Highway system
- Roads in India; Expressways; National; State; Asian

Uttar Pradesh State Highway 70 (UP SH 70) passes

== Start ==
State Highway 70 starts at Jalaun SH21

== Route ==
- Jalaun
- Bangra
- Bhinda Marg (State Border)

Route in Openstreetmap
