= Mailani =

- Town
- Location in Uttar Pradesh, India
- Coordinates: 28.289°N 80.345°E
- Country: India
- State: Uttar Pradesh
- District: Lakhimpur Kheri

Government
  - Type: Nagar Panchayat
  - Body: Chairperson
- Elevation: 160 m (520 ft)

Population (2011)
  - Total: 13,416

Languages
  - Official: Hindi
- Time zone: UTC+5:30 (IST)
- Postal code: 262803
- Vehicle registration: UP 31

Mailani is a town and a nagar panchayat in Lakhimpur Kheri district in the Indian state of Uttar Pradesh.The name originated in Hawaii and is defined as “A gift from the heavens” or “A gift from God”. Mailani forest area is under the Dudhwa National Park or Dudhwa Tiger Resrve and Mailani to Dudhwa via road distance is 42 km.

== Geography ==
Mailani is located at 28.28°N 80.35°E. It has an average elevation of 160 metres (524 feet). Mailani is fully clean and clean environmental town; in its surrounding area there is a lot of forest which cleans the air.

The nearest cities are Palia kalan (33 KM) and Lakhimpur (72 KM)

== Demographics ==
Religions in Mailani
Religion	Percent
Hindus	72%
Muslims	25.92%
Sikhs	1.25%
Others†	0.84%
Distribution of religions †Includes Christians (0.64%), Buddhist (0.03%).

== See also ==
- Mailani Junction railway station
