= Harvindar Kumar Sahani =

Indian politician

Harvinder Kumar Sahni

MLA in 17th Legislative Assembly of Uttar Pradesh
- Incumbent
- Assumed office March 2017
- Preceded by: Self
- Constituency: Palia

MLA in 16th Legislative Assembly of Uttar Pradesh
- In office March 2012 – March 2017
- Preceded by: Rajesh Kumar
- Succeeded by: Self
- Constituency: Palia

Personal details
- Born: 11 February 1965 (age 61) Lakhimpur Kheri district
- Party: Bhartiya Janta Party (2016– present)
- Other political affiliations: Bahujan Samaj Party (2012–2016)
- Education: Chhatrapati Shahu Ji Maharaj University
- Profession: Politician & businessperson

Harvinder Kumar Sahani also known as Romi Sahni is an Indian politician and a member of the 16th and Seventeenth Legislative Assembly of Uttar Pradesh in India. He represents the Palia constituency of Uttar Pradesh and was a member of the Bahujan Samaj Party till 2016, when he joined the Bhartiya Janata Party.

== Early life and education ==
Harvindar Kumar Sahani was born in Lakhimpur Kheri district. He attended the Chhatrapati Shahu Ji Maharaj University and attained Bachelor's degree.

== Political career ==
Harvindar Kumar Sahani has been a MLA since he represented the Palia constituency in 2012 as a member of the Bahujan Samaj Party.

In Sep. 2016 Sahani left the Bahujan Samaj Party and joined Bhartiya Janata Party. In Seventeenth Legislative Assembly of Uttar Pradesh 2017 he again represented the Palia constituency as a member of Bhartiya Janata Party defeating INC candidate Saif Ali Naqvi by a record margin of 69,228 votes.

== Posts held ==
#	From	To	Position	Comments
01	2012	2017	Member, 16th Legislative Assembly	
02	2017	2022	Member, 17th Legislative Assembly	
03	2022	Incumbent	Member, 18th Legislative Assembly	

== See also ==
- Palia (Assembly constituency)
- Sixteenth Legislative Assembly of Uttar Pradesh
- Uttar Pradesh Legislative Assembly
