= Kheri =

- Town
- Location in Uttar Pradesh, India
- Coordinates: 27.9°N 80.8°E
- Country: India
- State: Uttar Pradesh
- District: Lakhimpur Kheri
- Elevation: 148 m (486 ft)

Population (2011)
  - Total: 33,355

Languages
  - Official: Hindi, Urdu
- Time zone: UTC+5:30 (IST)
- Postal code: 262702
- Vehicle registration: UP-31

Kheri is a town and a Nagar Panchayat in Lakhimpur Kheri district in the Indian state of Uttar Pradesh.

== History ==
According to the 1908 British publication "The Imperial Gazetteer of India"(volume: XV):

[S. H. Butler, Settlement Report (1901); H. R. Nevill, District Gazetteer (1905).]

Kherl Town (Khiri). — Town in the khiri tahsil of Kherl District, United Provinces, situated in 27° 54' N. and 8o c 48' E., on the Lucknow-Bareilly State Railway. Population (1901), 6,223. Kheri is a place of some antiquity, and contains a tine tomb built over the remains of Saiyid Khurd, who died in 1563. It is administered under Act XX of 1856, with an income of about Rs. 800. Though giving its name to the District, it is of small importance. A daily market is held, and the town contains a branch of the American Methodist Mission and a school with 144 pupils.

== Geography ==
Kheri is located at 27.9°N 80.8°E. It has an average elevation of 148 metres (485 feet).

Kheri is served by the Kheri Town railway station.

== Demographics ==
As of 2011 India census, Kheri had a population of 33,355. Males constitute 52% of the population and females 48%. Kheri has an average literacy rate of 51.7%, lower than the national average of 73%: male literacy is 55.4%, and female literacy is 47.7%. In Kheri, 15% of the population is under 6 years of age.

Religions in Kheri
Religion	Percent
Muslims	79.33%
Hindus	20.09%
Others†	0.58%
Distribution of religions †Includes Sikhs (0.09%), Buddhists (<0.01%), Christians (0.21%)
