= Lakhimpur, Uttar Pradesh =

City in Uttar Pradesh India

Lakhimpur लखीमपुर
- City
- Lakhimpur Kheri
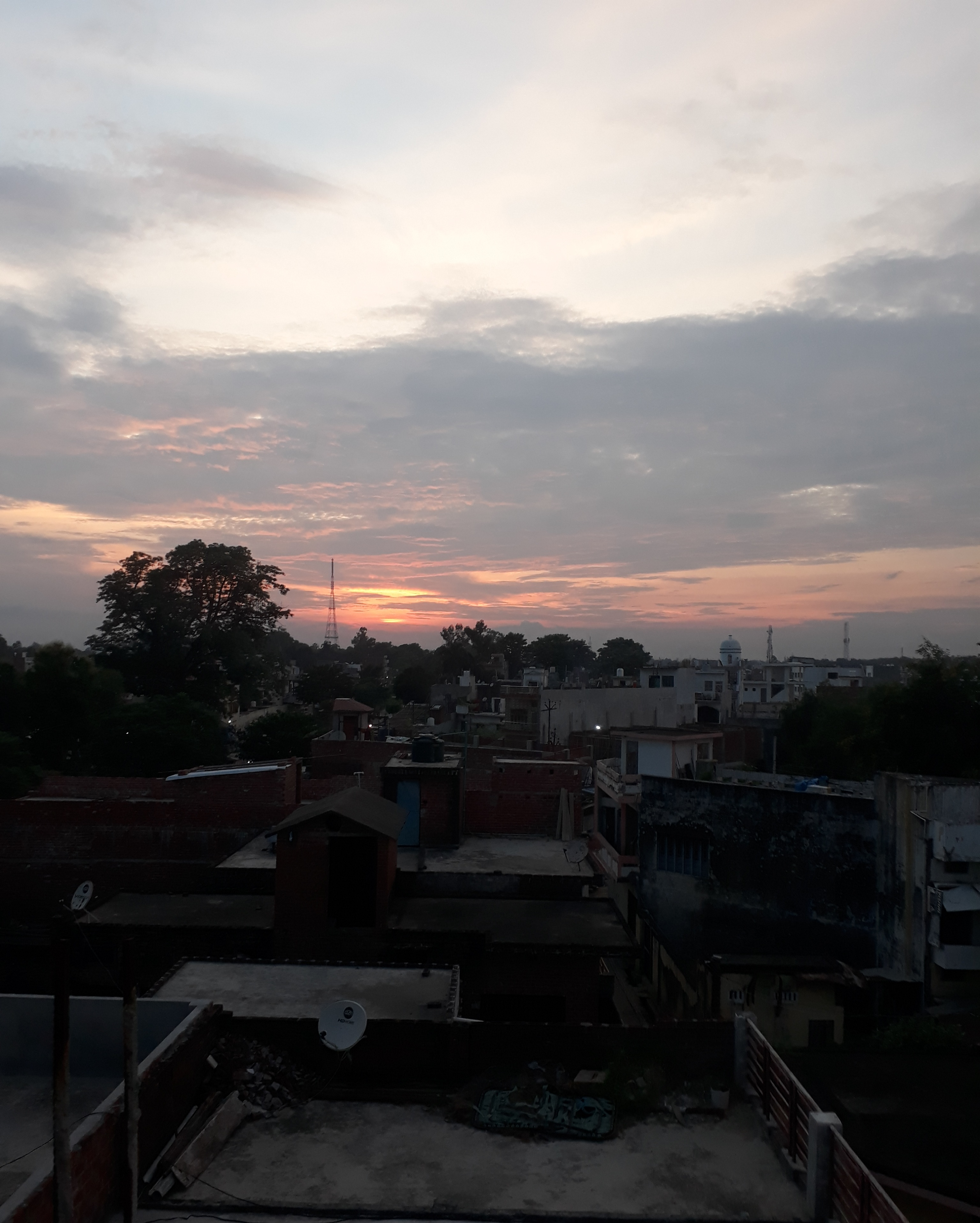
- Lakhimpur city

- Location in Uttar Pradesh, India
- Coordinates: 27.95°N 80.77°E
- Country: India
- State: Uttar Pradesh
- District: Lakhimpur Kheri
- Founder: Lord Shri Krishna

Area
  - Total: 10.10 km^{2} (3.90 sq mi)

Population (2011)
  - Total: 151,993
  - Density: 15,050/km^{2} (38,980/sq mi)

Language
  - Official: Hindi
  - Additional official: Urdu English
- Time zone: UTC+5:30 (IST)
- Pincode: 262701
- Vehicle registration: UP-31

Lakhimpur is a city and a municipal board in the Lakhimpur Kheri district of the Indian state of Uttar Pradesh.

== Geography ==
Lakhimpur is located at 27.95°N 80.77°E. It has an average elevation of 147 metres (482 ft).

- Latitude : 27.6 to 28.6 (North)
- Longitude : 80.34 to 81.30 (East)

It shares its boundaries with –

- North – Nepal
- West – Shahjahanpur districts
- South – Hardoi & Sitapur district
- East – Bahraich district.

Its main rivers are Sharda, Ghaghara, Koriyala, Ull, Sarayan, Chauka, Gomti, Kathana, Saryu and Mohana.

== Climate ==
The climate is hot throughout the year except the rainy seasons. In winter, nights are very cold. Fog is very common in this season.

- Winter: November to February 30 °C to 0 °C
- Summer: March to June 46 °C to 20 °C
- Rainy Season: July to October 35 °C to 20 °C
- Rainfall: 1400 mm (Normal)

Climate data for Lakhimpur, Uttar Pradesh (1991–2020, extremes 1951–2020)
| Month | Jan | Feb | Mar | Apr | May | Jun | Jul | Aug | Sep | Oct | Nov | Dec | Year |
|---|---|---|---|---|---|---|---|---|---|---|---|---|---|
| Record high °C (°F) | 32.1 (89.8) | 34.2 (93.6) | 42.2 (108.0) | 47.6 (117.7) | 47.0 (116.6) | 47.3 (117.1) | 43.4 (110.1) | 42.0 (107.6) | 40.0 (104.0) | 39.4 (102.9) | 35.3 (95.5) | 31.4 (88.5) | 47.6 (117.7) |
| Mean daily maximum °C (°F) | 20.2 (68.4) | 24.4 (75.9) | 31.1 (88.0) | 36.8 (98.2) | 38.4 (101.1) | 36.8 (98.2) | 33.6 (92.5) | 33.3 (91.9) | 33.4 (92.1) | 30.4 (86.7) | 26.5 (79.7) | 20.1 (68.2) | 31.1 (88.0) |
| Mean daily minimum °C (°F) | 8.4 (47.1) | 11.9 (53.4) | 16.2 (61.2) | 21.3 (70.3) | 24.7 (76.5) | 26.3 (79.3) | 25.9 (78.6) | 25.8 (78.4) | 24.6 (76.3) | 20.5 (68.9) | 14.5 (58.1) | 9.9 (49.8) | 19.0 (66.2) |
| Record low °C (°F) | 1.0 (33.8) | 3.4 (38.1) | 7.4 (45.3) | 11.1 (52.0) | 16.7 (62.1) | 15.0 (59.0) | 19.2 (66.6) | 20.3 (68.5) | 18.0 (64.4) | 12.8 (55.0) | 6.1 (43.0) | 3.5 (38.3) | 2.4 (36.3) |
| Average rainfall mm (inches) | 14.6 (0.57) | 19.0 (0.75) | 6.7 (0.26) | 2.6 (0.10) | 34.6 (1.36) | 140.6 (5.54) | 205.8 (8.10) | 225.9 (8.89) | 144.9 (5.70) | 16.7 (0.66) | 0.9 (0.04) | 7.1 (0.28) | 819.3 (32.26) |
| Average rainy days | 1.2 | 1.6 | 0.8 | 0.4 | 2.2 | 5.5 | 9.4 | 9.3 | 6.2 | 0.8 | 0.2 | 0.5 | 38.0 |
| Average relative humidity (%) (at 17:30 IST) | 69 | 59 | 47 | 43 | 44 | 58 | 75 | 78 | 76 | 68 | 64 | 69 | 62 |
Source: India Meteorological Department

== Government and politics ==
- 2 Parliamentary Constituencies – Kheri (Lok Sabha constituency) (विन) and Dhaurahra (Lok Sabha constituency)
- Member of Parliament of Kheri (Lok Sabha constituency) - Utkarsh Verma
- Member of Parliament of Dhaurahra (Lok Sabha constituency) - Anand Bhadauriya
- 8 Assembly Constituencies – Mohammadi, Gola Gokarannath, Kasta, Lakhimpur, Srinagar, Nighasan, Dhaurahara, Palia.
- 7 Tehsils – Lakhimpur, Mohammdi, Gola, Nighasan, Dhaurahra, Palia, Mitauli
- 15 blocks – Lakhimpur, Behjam, Mitauli, Pasgawan, Mohammdi, Gola, Bankeyganj, Bijuwa, Paliya, Nighasan, Ramiyabehar, Issanagar, Dhaurahara, Nakaha, Phoolbehar.
- 4 Nagar Palikas – Lakhimpur, Gola, Mohammadi, Palia
- 6 Town Areas – Kheri, Oel, Mailani, Barbar, Singahi, Dhaurahara.

== Demographics ==
As of 2011 Indian Census, Lakhimpur city had a total population of 151,993, of which 80,523 were males and 71,470 were females. Population within the age group of 0 to 6 years was 17,167. The total number of literates in Lakhimpur was 112,043, which constituted 73.7% of the population with male literacy of 76.9% and female literacy of 70.1%. The effective literacy rate of 7+ population of Lakhimpur was 83.1%, of which male literacy rate was 86.8% and female literacy rate was 78.9%. The Scheduled Castes and Scheduled Tribes population was 13,394 and 312 respectively. Lakhimpur had 28199 households in 2011.

=== Languages ===
Languages spoken here include Hindi, Urdu, and Awadhi, a vernacular in the Hindi dialect continuum spoken by over 38 million people, mainly in the Awadh region.

=== Religion ===
Religion in Lakhimpur city
| Religion | Perfect |
| Hinduism | 75.62% |
| Islam | 22.29% |
| Sikhism | 1.06% |
| Other | 1.03% |

== Economy ==
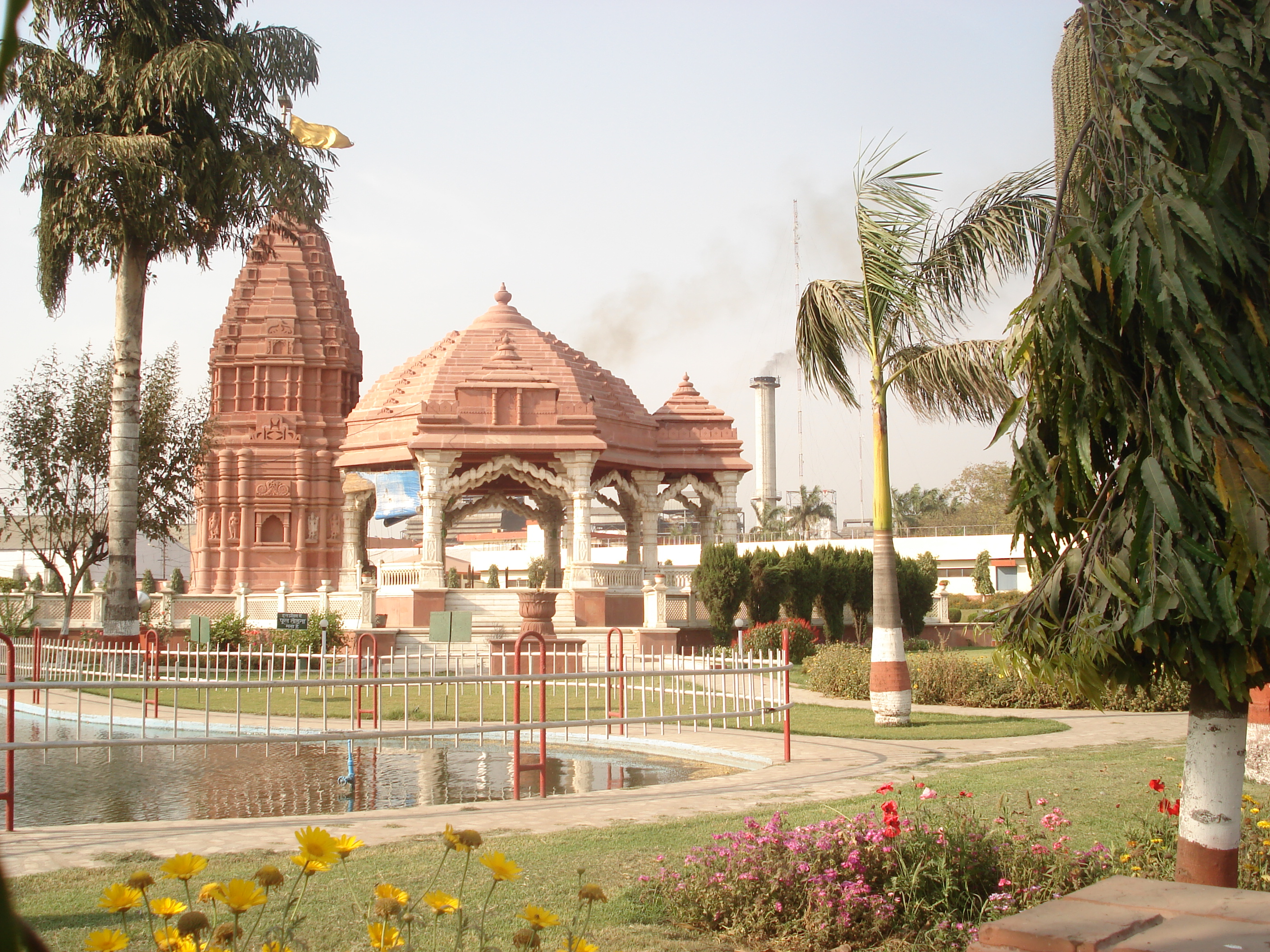
Bajaj Hindustan Sugar Factory, Gola

In 2006 the Ministry of Panchayati Raj named Lakhimpur Kheri one of the country's 250 most backward districts (out of a total of 640). It is the largest district of the 34 districts in Uttar Pradesh currently receiving funds from the Backward Regions Grant Fund Programme (BRGF).

== Agriculture ==
Known for its sugar cane industry, it satisfies a huge part of the world's sugar demands. Some of the biggest sugar mills are in the district. Bajaj sugar mill in Gola Gokarnath and Bajaj sugar mill in Palia Kalan and DSCL sugar mills (Ajbapur), kumbhi sugar mills kumbhi, (Mohammdi) are the four largest sugar mills in Asia. Balrampur Industries also runs its sugar mills from Lakhimpur. Lakhimpur is also famous for cottage industries of incense sticks.

== Industry ==
The main industry which dominates Lakhimpur Kheri is the sugar industry. It houses various sugar industries ranging from small plants to big integrated sugar mills. There are many private, government and co-operative sugar mills in the region. Steel Authority of India Limited (SAIL) is setting up a steel processing unit in Behjam, Lakhimpur at an estimated cost of ₹85 crore. The processing unit will have an installed capacity of 100,000 tonnes per annum and produce TMT (thermo mechanically treated) bars from input material sourced from SAIL's integrated steel plants.Lakhimpur has GSDP of Rs 19459 cr.

== Education ==
Education is available at the Junior and Senior Basic Schools, Senior Secondary Schools and college level.

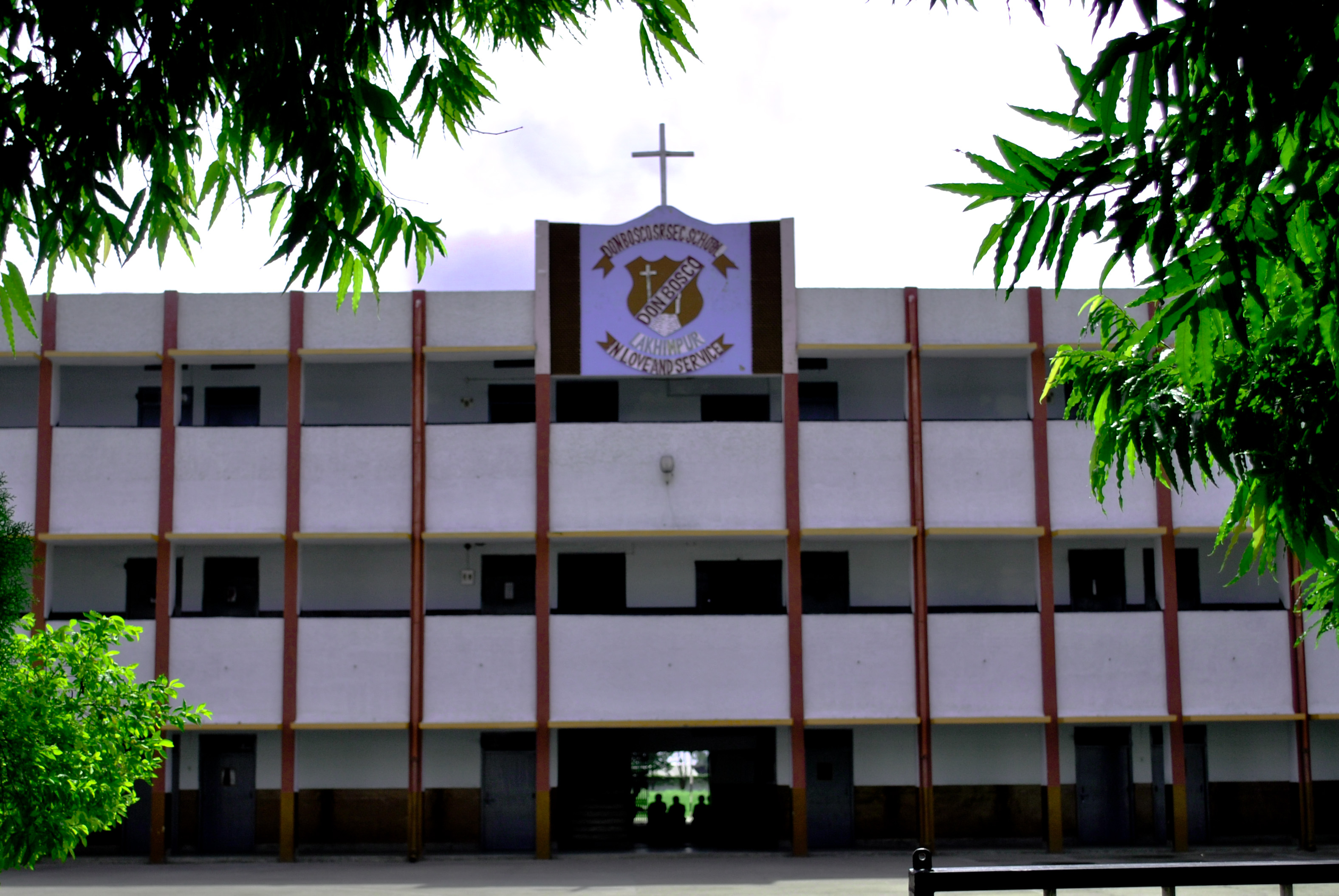
St. Don Bosco's College

Lakhimpur Kheri has a majority of small schools with limited enrollments. However the bigger ones include Lucknow Public School St. Don Bosco Inter College Lakhimpur Kheri and Pt. Deen Dayal upadhyay vidya mandir

== Tourism ==
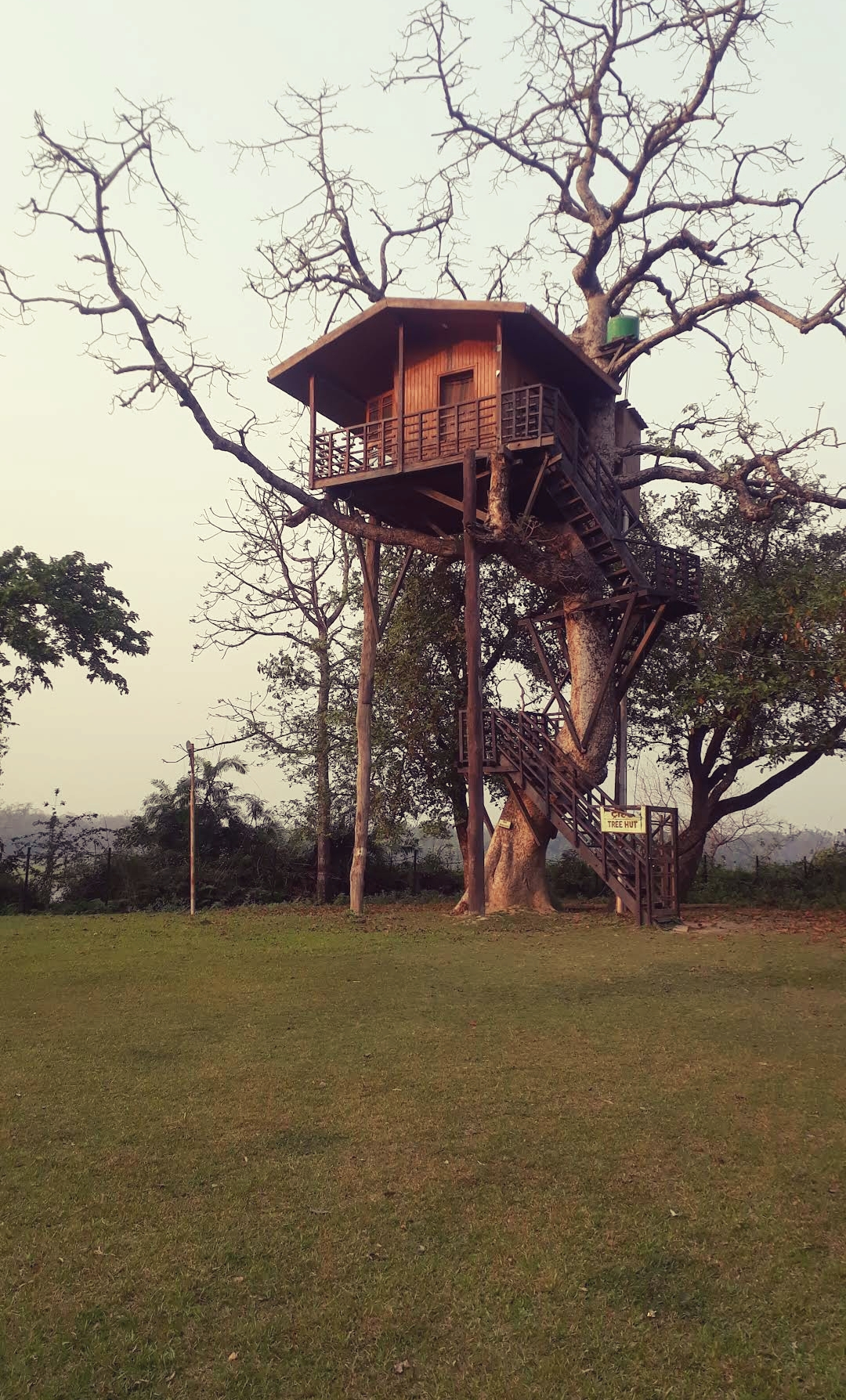
Tree Hut at Katarniaghat Wildlife Sanctuary

Dudhwa Tiger Reserve (DTR) has two core areas, Dudhwa National Park and Kishanpur Wildlife Sanctuary, which were merged in 1987. Dudhwa National Park is known as the first National Park of the state after the formation of Uttarakhand.

It is home to a large number of rare and endangered species including Tiger, Leopard cat, Rhinoceros (one-horned), Hispid hare, Elephants, Black deer, Swamp deer, etc.

A bird watchers' haven, Dudhwa is noted for its avian variety – about 400 species. Its swamps and several lakes attract varieties of waterfowl. Being close to the Himalayan foothills, Dudhwa also gets its regular winter visitors – the migratory water birds. The Banke Tal is perhaps the most popular spot for bird watchers. There are egrets, cormorants, herons and several species of duck, geese and teal.

Dudhwa

Conservation History

The visit of Sir D.B. Brandis in 1860 to the area culminated in a 303 square miles (780 km^{2}) forest area of the present day Dudhwa National Park being brought under the control of Government in 1861 for preservation. In Kheri District all the Sal and miscellaneous forests and grasslands in Khairigarh Pargana, between the Mohana and Suheli rivers, were included in the then North Kheri Forest Division. More areas were reserved for protection between 1867 and 1879 and added to the Division. The area of the Division was legally constituted as Reserved Forests in 1937.

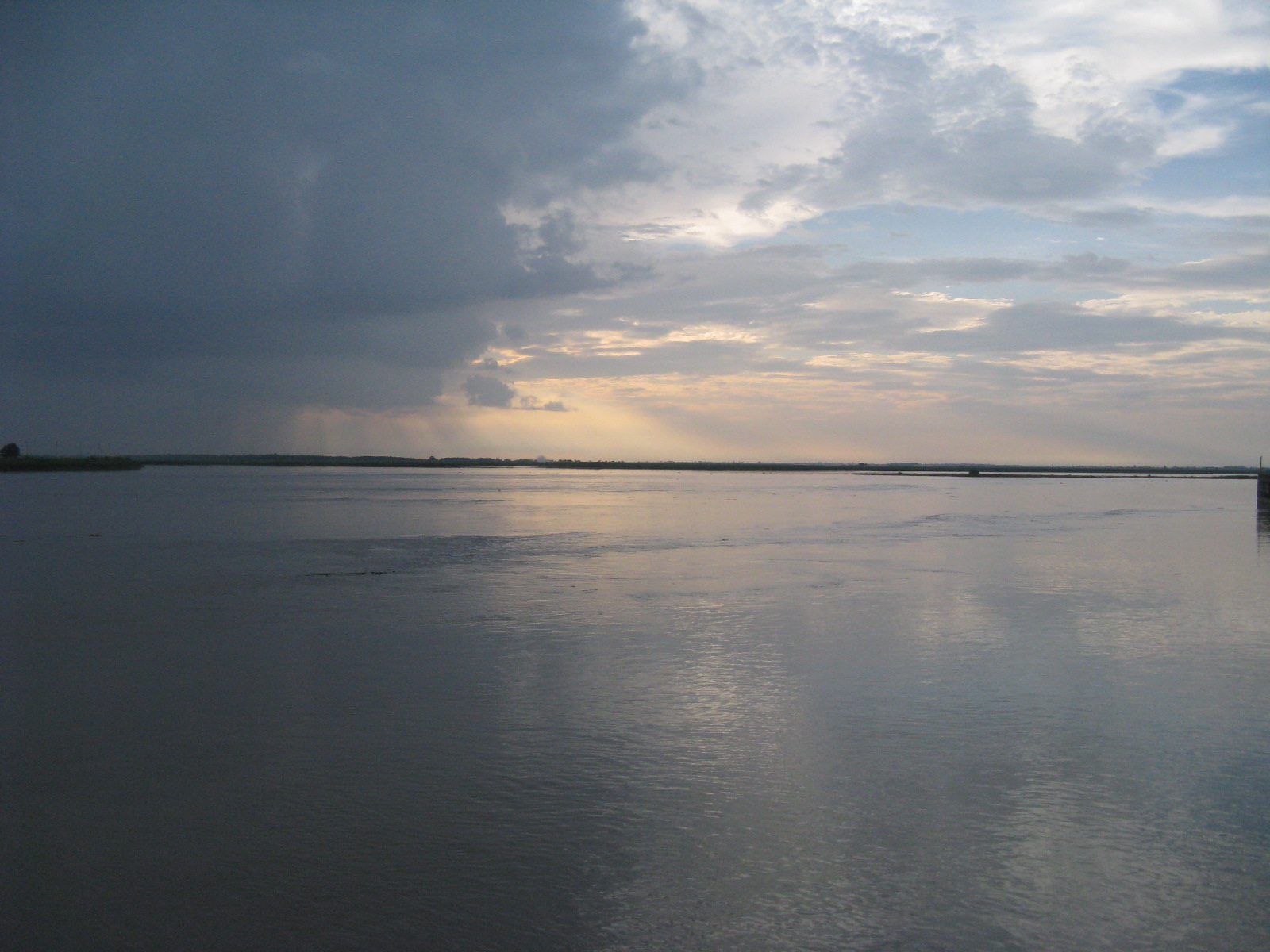
Sharda River

The Sonaripur Sanctuary, comprising 15.7 km^{2}, was created in 1958 to specifically protect swamp deer (Cervus duvaceli duvaceli). The area was too small and was later enlarged to 212 km^{2} and renamed as Dudhwa Sanctuary in 1968. Later, more area was added to the Sanctuary and in 1977, it was declared Dudhwa National Park. The total area of the Park was 616 km^{2} of which 490 km^{2} was the core zone and the balance of 124 km^{2} was a buffer zone.

The area was established in 1958 as a wildlife sanctuary. On 1 February 1977 wildlife sanctuary became a national park and after 11 years, in 1988, largely due to the efforts of Billy Arjan Singh it was established as a tiger reserve. Dudhwa Tiger Reserve lies on the India-Nepal border in the foothills of the Himalaya. Dudhwa Tiger Reserve was created in the year 1987–88 comprising Dudhwa National Park and Kishanpur Sanctuary (203.41 km^{2}). With an addition of 66 km^{2} to the buffer zone in 1997, the present area of the Tiger Reserve is 884 km^{2}. Distance from Lakhimpur railway station to Dudhwa is about 100 km by road. Sharda Dam and Deer Park are other major attractions of Lakhimpur.

== Historical places ==
=== Naseeruddin Memorial Hall ===
East India Company built Willoughby Memorial Hall in 1924 in the memory of Sir Robert William Douglas Willoughby, Deputy Commissioner of Kheri. On 26 April 1936, Willoughby Memorial Library was established. Freedom Fighter Naseeruddin Mauzi Nagar and Rajnarayan Mishra shot the Deputy Commissioner and they were later hanged by the colonial rulers during freedom struggle. Willoughby Memorial Hall was recently renamed as Naseeruddin Memorial Hall.

=== Eid Gaah, Kheri ===
The Eid Gaah is a mosque well known for its picturesque scene and architecture. It is near the railway tracks between Lakhimpur and Kheri.

=== Shiv Temple Gola Gokaran Nath ===
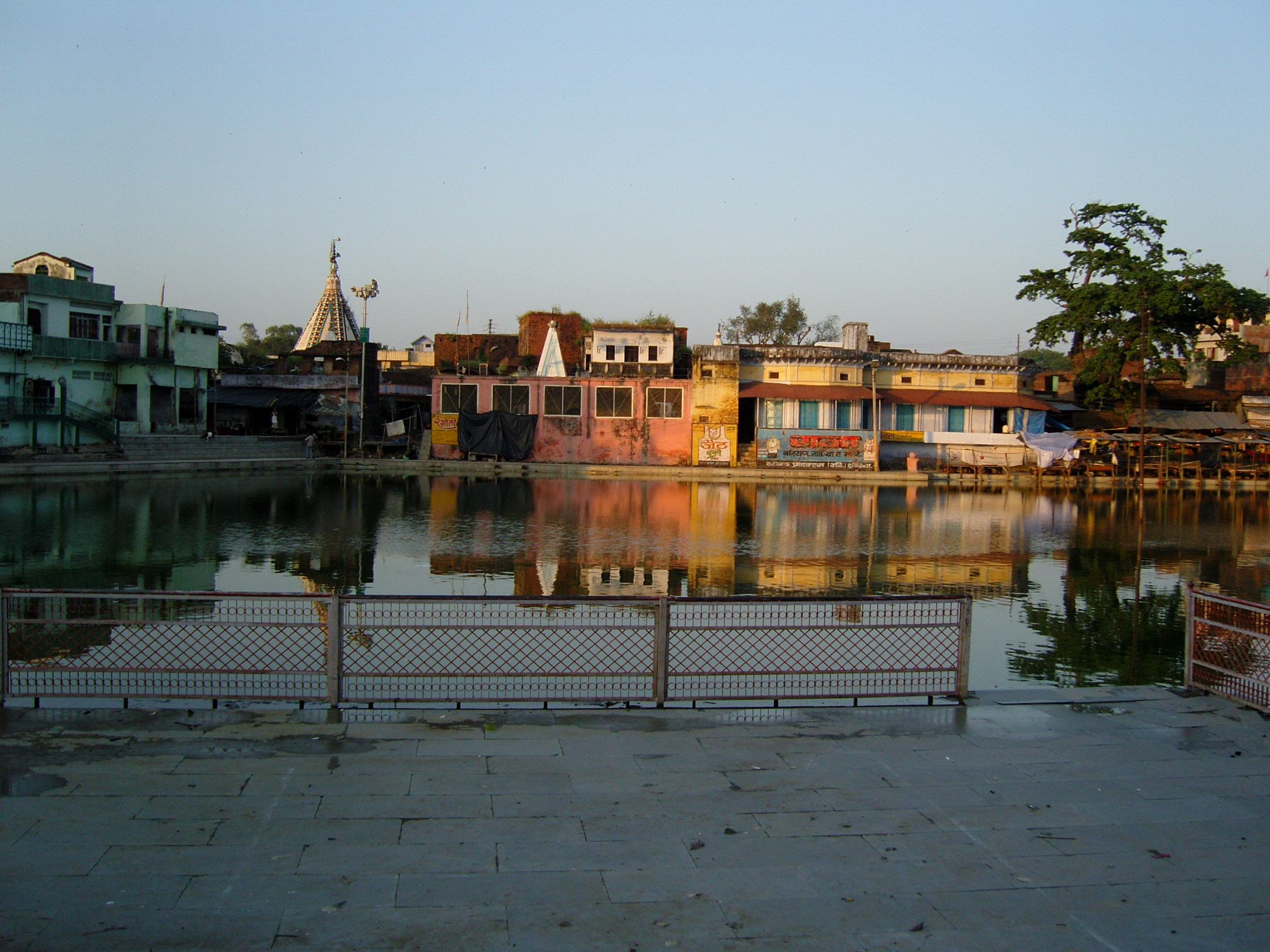
Teerth-Kund at Shiv Temple, Gola

Shiv Temple of Gola Gokaran Nath is a temple dedicated to Lord Shiva. The Gola Gokaran Nath is also called Choti Kashi. It is the belief of the people that Lord Shiva was pleased with the penance (Tapasya) of Rawana (King of Lanka) and offered him a boon. Rawana requested the Lord Shiva to go to Lanka with him and leave Himalaya forever. The Lord Shiva agreed to go on condition that he should not be placed anywhere on the way to Lanka. If he were placed anywhere, he would settle at that place. Rawana agreed and started his journey to Lanka with the Lord on his head. When Rawana reached the Gola Gokaran Nath (then called Gollihara) he felt the need to urinate (a call of nature). Rawana offered some gold coins to a shepherd (who was none other than Lord Ganesha sent by deities) for placing the Lord Shiva on his head until he returned. The shepherd (Lord Ganesha) placed him on the land. Rawana failed to lift him up despite all his efforts. He pressed him on his head with his thumb in full anger. The impression of Rawana's thumb is still present on the Shivling. In the month of Chatra (April) a great fair is organised for one month known as Cheti-Mela.

=== Sankata Devi Mandir ===
Sankata Devi Mandir is also located in Lakhimpur.

=== Frog Temple ===
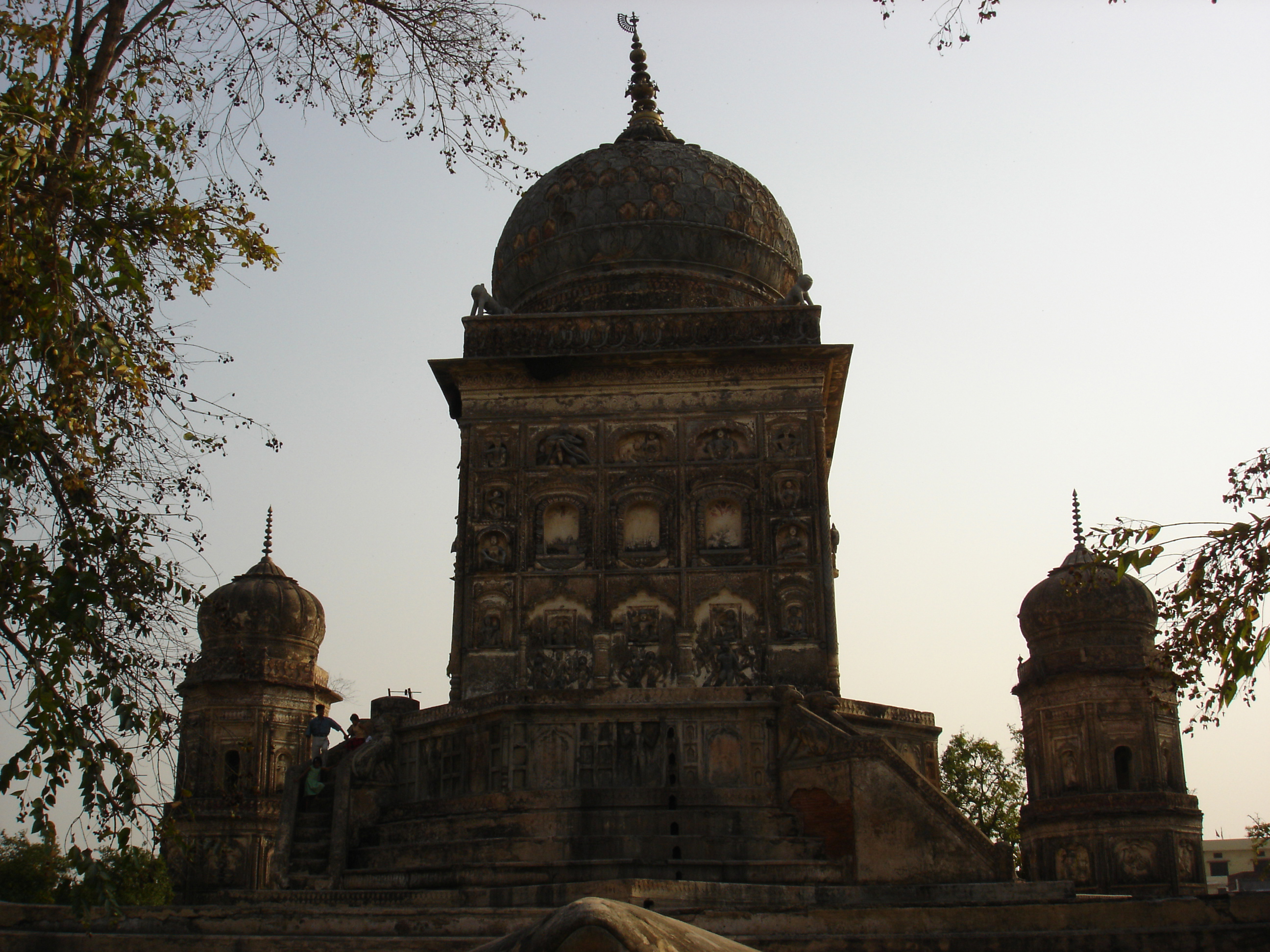
Frog temple

The unique Frog Temple lies at Oel town, 12 km (7.5 mi) from Lakhimpur on the route from Lakhimpur to Sitapur. It is an important tourist centre for the city. It is also the only one of its kind in India based on Manduk Tantra. It was built by the former king of Oel State (Lakhimpur Kheri district) between 1860 and 1870. It is dedicated to Lord Shiva. This temple is built at the back of a large frog. The Temple is constructed within an octagonal lotus. The Shivling installed in the temple was brought from the Banasur Prati Narmdeshwar Narmada Kund. The main gate of the temple opens in the east and another gate is in the south. The architecture of this temple is based on Tantra Vidya.

=== Shiv Temple Devkali ===
It is said that Janmejayi son of king Prikshit organised famous Nag Yagya at this place. It is believed that snakes do not enter houses where the holy soil of this temple is present. This temple is dedicated to Lord Shiva. It is also believed that the Devakali, daughter of Lord Brahama (Founder of the world) did a hard penance (Tapsya) at this place. After the name of Lord Brahama's daughter this place is known as Devakali.it is said if we request to God with pure heart then God provide thatgift to them

== Transport ==
Lakhimpur city is 124 km (77 mi) from the state capital Lucknow. It can be easily reached by train (Broad gauge) or UPSRTC Bus services.

The nearest airports are Chaudhary Charan Singh International Airport, Lucknow (135 km) and Palia (not operational – 90 km)

== Communication and radio stations ==
Communication networks

All prominent tele-communication network providers in India offer their services in Lakhimpur. The city of Lakhimpur falls under "Uttar Pradesh Central telecom Circle". Calls from the city of Lakhimpur to neighbouring districts including the rest of the area in the Uttar Pradesh and "Uttarakhand telecom circle" are considered to be local.

| GSM Service Providers | GSM Service Providers | Broadband Service Providers |
|---|---|---|
| Idea Cellular(Escotel) | Jio | BSNL Broadband |
| CellOne | Tata Indicom | Airtel Broadband |
| Airtel | BSNL WLL | Sify iWay |
| Vodafone-IN | Aircel | |

Radio services

Radio is one of the modes of entertainment in Lakhimpur. Radio services available are:

| Service Provider | Frequency |
|---|---|
| Akashwani | 100.4 MHz |
| Big 92.7 FM | 92.7 MHz |
| Radio Mantra | 91.9 MHz |

== See also ==
- Dudhwa National Park
- Kheri Lok Sabha constituency
- Dhaurahra Lok Sabha constituency
