= Terai Arc Landscape =

Indo-Nepalese trans-border ecosystem

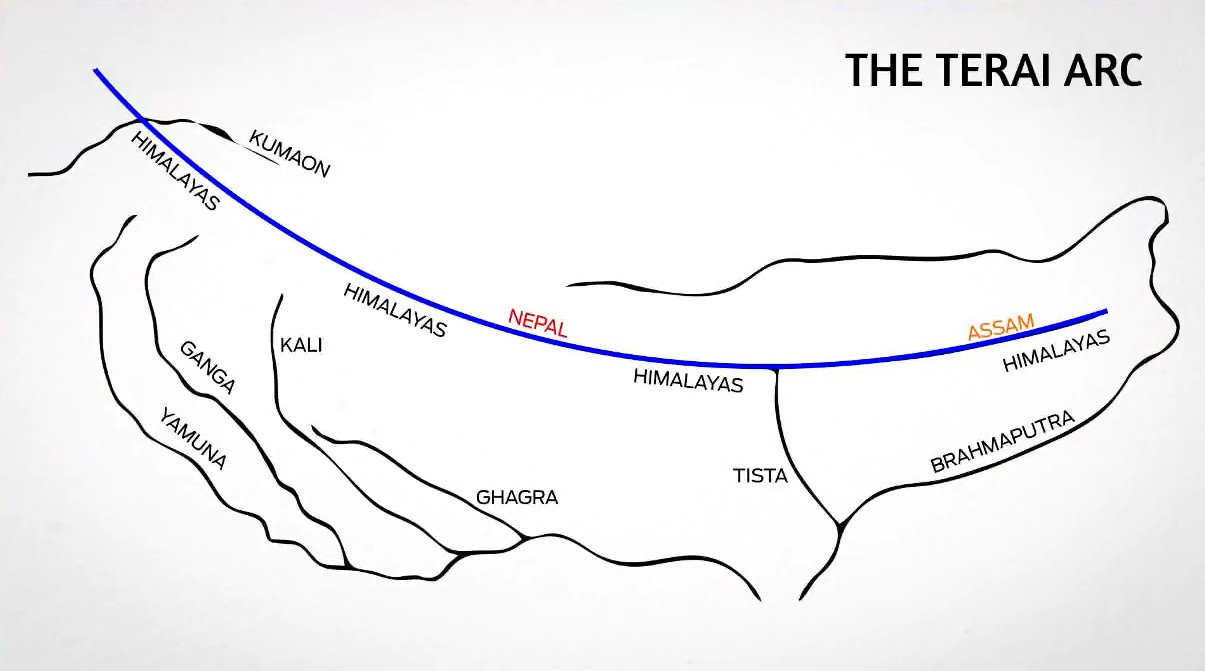
Terai Arc Landscape

The Terai Arc Landscape (TAL) is composed of 14 Indian and Nepalese trans-border protected ecosystems of the Terai (Sanskrit for "lowlands") and nearby foothills of the Himalayas. and encompassing 14 protected areas of Nepal and India. The area spans approximately 12.3 million acres (5 million hectares) and includes Nepal's Bagmati River to the east and India's Yamuna River to the west. The TAL is home to many endangered mammals including the Bengal tiger (of which it has one of the world's highest densities), the Indian rhinoceros, the gaur, the wild Asian elephant, the hispid hare, the sloth bear, the South Asian river dolphin and the chital, as well as over 500 species of birds, many endangered. Examples of birds are the endangered Bengal florican, the sarus crane, and the black stork.

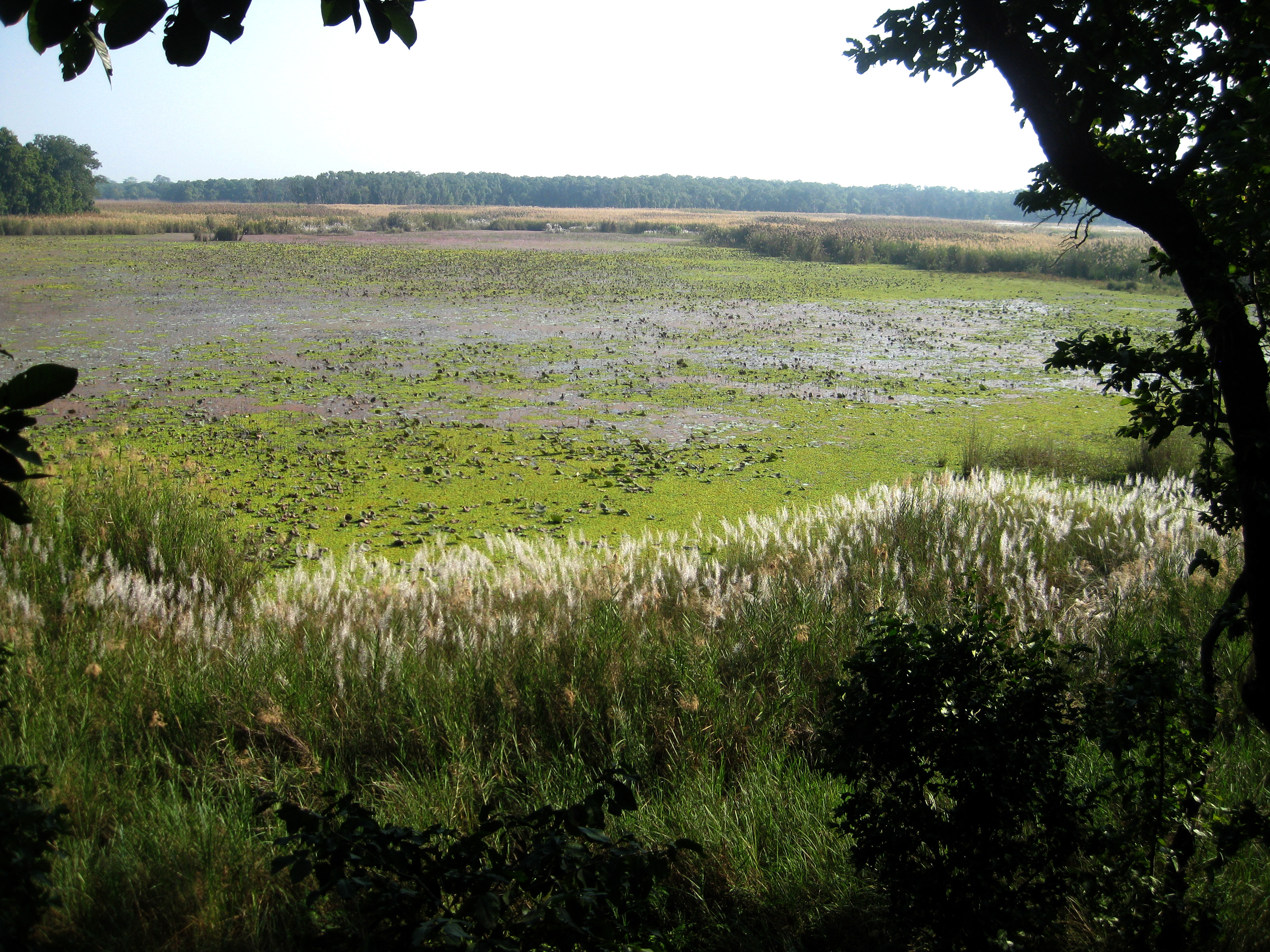
Ranitaal Lake in Shuklaphanta National Park

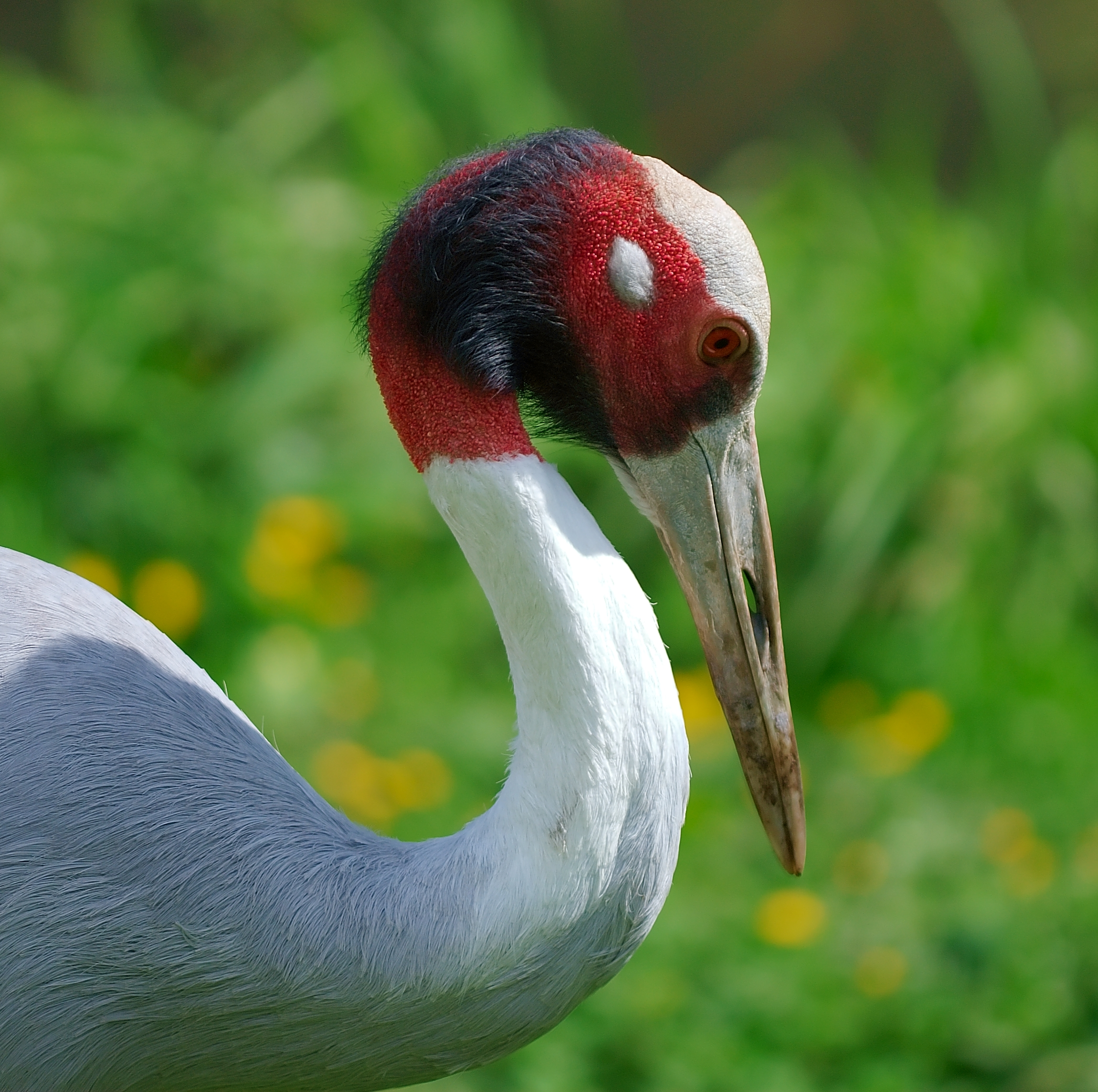
The Sarus crane, one of the endangered species in the TAL

The rivers and wetlands of the TAL are rich and diverse ecosystems with many endemic species that support, besides birds and mammals, a wide range of fish, amphibians, and fresh water crustaceans. However, the area faces many challenges to the wildlife. Of the 14 protected areas within the TAL, none is large enough, by itself, to sustain a population of tigers over time. If the protected areas were to be linked by wildlife corridors, individual tigers would be able to move from area to area, furthering its ability to survive long-term. TAL is densely populated and its welfare is of critical importance to its human and animal life. Its approximately three million people are among the world's poorest (50% live below the poverty live) and generally subsist on the land. As of the beginning of 2013, the Indian government will give a donation to farmers who grow flowers in the Terai.

== Protected areas within the Terai Arc Landscape ==
The following are protected areas within the boundaries of the TAL:

=== Shuklaphanta National Park ===
Shuklaphanta National Park is a national park in the Terai of the Far-Western Region, Nepal, covering 305 km^{2} (118 sq mi) of open grasslands, forests, riverbeds and wetlands at an elevation of 174 to 1,386 m (571 to 4,547 ft). It is bounded by the Mahakali river in the west and south. A small part extends north of the Mahendra Highway to create a wildlife corridor for seasonal migration of wildlife into the Sivalik Hills. It was gazetted in 1976 as Royal Shuklaphanta Wildlife Reserve and was enlarged to its present size in the late 1980s. A buffer zone of 243.5 km^{2} (94.0 sq mi) was added in 2004. It receives a mean annual rainfall of 1,579 mm (62.2 in) and harbours 700 floral, 456 bird, 56 reptile and 15 amphibian species.

=== Bardia National Park ===
Bardiya National Park is a protected area in Nepal that was established in 1988 as Royal Bardia National Park. Covering an area of 968 km^{2} (374 sq mi) it is the largest and most undisturbed national park in Nepal's Terai, adjoining the eastern bank of the Karnali River and bisected by the Babai River in the Bardiya District. Its northern limits are demarcated by the crest of the Siwalik Hills. The Nepalgunj-Surkhet highway partly forms the southern boundary, but seriously disrupts the protected area. Natural boundaries for human settlements are formed in the west by the Geruwa, a branch of the Karnali River, and in the southeast by the Babai River.

Together with the neighboring Banke National Park, the coherent protected area of 1,437 km^{2} (555 sq mi) represents the Tiger Conservation Unit (TCU) Bardia-Banke that extends over 2,231 km^{2} (861 sq mi) of alluvial grasslands and subtropical moist deciduous forests.

=== Banke National Park ===
Banke National Park is located in the Lumbini Province and was established in 2010 as Nepal’s tenth national park after its recognition as a "Gift to the Earth". The protected area covers an area of 550 km^{2} (210 sq mi) with most parts falling in the Sivalik Hills. The park is surrounded by a buffer zone of 344 km^{2} (133 sq mi) in the districts of Banke, Salyan and Dang Deukhuri Districts.

Together with the neighbouring Bardia National Park, the coherent protected area of 1,518 km^{2} (586 sq mi) represents the Tiger Conservation Unit (TCU) Bardia-Banke.

=== Blackbuck Conservation Area ===
The Blackbuck Conservation Area is located in Gulariya, Bardiya District, Nepal and was established in 2009 to conserve the endangered blackbuck. This protected area covers 16.95 km^{2} (6.54 sq mi).

=== Chitwan National Park ===
Chitwan National Park is the first national park of Nepal. It was established in 1973 as the Royal Chitwan National Park and was granted the status of a World Heritage Site in 1984. It covers an area of 952.63 km^{2} (367.81 sq mi) in the Terai of south-central Nepal. It ranges in elevation from about 100 m (330 ft) in the river valleys to 815 m (2,674 ft) in the Sivalik Hills.

=== Parsa National Park ===
Parsa National Park is a national park in the Terai of south-central Nepal covering an area of 627.39 km^{2} (242.24 sq mi) in the Parsa, Makwanpur and Bara Districts and ranging in elevation from 435 to 950 m (1,427 to 3,117 ft) in the Sivalik Hills. It was established as a wildlife reserve in 1984 and received national park status in 2017. It is surrounded by a buffer zone since 2005 with an area of 285.3 km^{2} (110.2 sq mi). In 2015, the protected area was further extended by 49 sq mi (128 km^{2}).

To the north of Parsa National Park, the East Rapti River and Sivalik Hills form a natural boundary to human settlements. To the east, the boundary extends up to the Hetauda–Birgunj highway; to the south, a forest road demarcates the park's boundary. To the west is Chitwan National Park, which is situated just north of Valmiki National Park, a tiger reserve in India. Thus, this transnational protected area of 2,075 km^{2} (801 sq mi) represents the Tiger Conservation Unit (TCU) Chitwan–Parsa–Valmiki, which covers a total of 3,549 km^{2} (1,370 sq mi) in the Terai–Duar savanna and grasslands.

Before being converted to a protected area, the region was a private game reserve and hunting park for both the British and Nepalese elite.

=== Jim Corbett National Park ===
Jim Corbett National Park is a national park in the Nainital district of the state of Uttarakhand, India. It was established in 1936 as the country's first national park and is named in honour of Jim Corbett, who had played a leading role in its establishment. It was the first to come under the Project Tiger initiative and encompasses an area of 520.8 km^{2} (201.1 sq mi) consisting of hills, riverine belts, marshy depressions, grasslands and a large lake at an elevation range of 400–1,220 m (1,300–4,000 ft). It receives rainfall from July to September. Almost 73% of the national park is covered by dense moist deciduous forest dominated by Shorea robusta, peepal, rohini and mango trees among 110 tree species and 617 different plant species. Grasslands cover about 10% of its total area. It harbours 50 mammal species, 580 bird species and 25 reptile species. The increase in tourist activities continues to present a serious challenge to the park's ecological balance.

=== Rajaji National Park ===
Rajaji National Park is a national park and tiger reserve in the Haridwar, Dehradun and Pauri Garhwal districts of the Indian state of Uttarakhand. It encompasses an area of 820 km^{2} (320 sq mi) in the Sivalik Hills. In 1983, three wildlife sanctuaries in the area, namely Chilla, Motichur and Rajaji, were merged into one.

=== Pilibhit Tiger Reserve ===
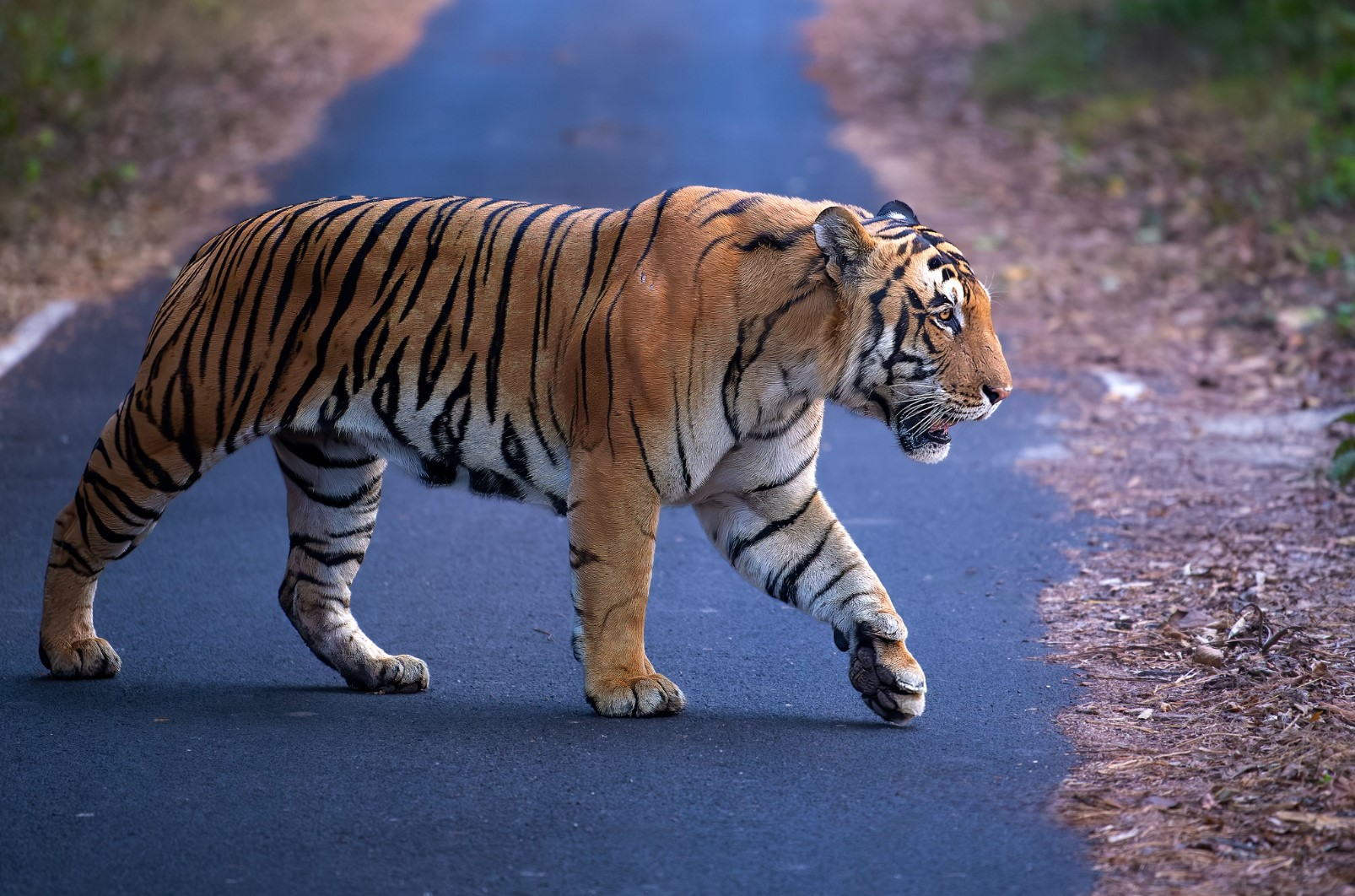
Rocket, a Bengal tiger on the pakki patri area at Pilibhit Tiger Reserve

Pilibhit Tiger Reserve (pronounced [piːliːbʱiːt̪ ˈtaɪɡə rɪˈzɜːvː]), is among the narrowest yet most canopy-rich tiger reserves, spread across a horseshoe-shaped landscape. It covers a total area of 730.24 km^{2}, of which 97.6% (712.88 km^{2}) lies in Pilibhit district and 2.4% (17.36 km^{2}) in Shahjahanpur district, both located in the Rohilkhand region of Uttar Pradesh. Approximately 21% of Pilibhit district's total geographical area comes under reserve's limits, thereby positioning it in the category of Uttar Pradesh's most forest-rich districts. It consists of the Himalayan lowlands terrain along the Indo–Nepal border in the upper northern plains. The habitat is distinguished by tall grasslands, sal forests, and the swamp ecosystem, which is maintained through regular flooding events originating from nearby rivers, riverlets and lakes during the rainy seasons. The Sharda sagar dam elongating up to a length of 22 km (14 mi) is on the edge of the reserve.

The core area of the reserve contains 35 species of mammals, 556 avians species, 79 species of piscines, as well as several species of reptiles and amphibians, including herbivorous, carnivorous, and omnivorous fauna. In 2020, the tiger reserve was awarded the inaugural TX2 global award in recognition of its achievement in multiplying the number of tiger within the stipulated time frame. As per an internal survey conducted by the authorities in 2022, the reserve has more than 99,882 animals of 22 species of different class. In August 2025, the reserve's officials confirmed that the core area hosts more than 79 adult tigers. (Note: including 14 males, 53 females, and 12 tigers of undetermined gender. This figure excludes an additional 18 tigers, comprising cubs less than one year of age and individual tigers that have dispersed beyond the designated core zone into adjacent agricultural areas, commonly referred to as sugarcane tigers.) The reserve is known to have an estimated tiger density of 10.8 per 100 km^{2} area. (Note: (total recorded tigers in the core area / area in sqaure kilometers)*100)

=== Kishanpur Wildlife Sanctuary ===
Kishanpur Wildlife Sanctuary is a wildlife sanctuary in Uttar Pradesh, India. It covers an area of 227 km^{2} (88 sq mi) and was founded in 1972.

It is part of Dudhwa Tiger Reserve.

=== Dudhwa National Park ===
Dudhwa National Park is a national park in the Terai belt of marshy grasslands in northern Uttar Pradesh, India. It stretches over an area of 490.3 km^{2} (189.3 sq mi), with a buffer zone of 190 km^{2} (73 sq mi). It is part of the Dudhwa Tiger Reserve in the Kheri and Lakhimpur districts.

=== Katarniaghat Wildlife Sanctuary ===
Katarniaghat Wildlife Sanctuary is a wildlife sanctuary in the Upper Gangetic plain, near Bahraich city in Bahraich district of Uttar Pradesh, India and covers an area of 400.6 km^{2} (154.7 sq mi) in the Terai of the Bahraich district. It was established in 1975. In 1987, it was brought under the purview of the Project Tiger, and together with the Kishanpur Wildlife Sanctuary and the Dudhwa National Park it forms the Dudhwa Tiger Reserve. It is part of the Terai Elephant Reserve.

=== Suhelva Sanctuary ===
Suhelva Sanctuary is a wildlife sanctuary located in Balrampur, Gonda and Sravasti districts of the state of Uttar Pradesh in India. It is about 66 km from Balrampur, 120 km from Gonda and about 210 km from Lucknow. It covers an area of 452 square kilometers.

=== Valmiki National Park ===
Valmiki National Park is a national park and tiger reserve in the West Champaran District of Bihar, India covering 898.45 km^{2} (346.89 sq mi). It is the only national park in Bihar.
