= Dundwa =

Dundwa, Dundawa, Dudhwa, Dudwa, Doodwa, etc. refer to:

- Dudhwa National Park, a wildlife sanctuary in Lakhimpur Kheri District, Uttar Pradesh state, India
- Dudhwa Tiger Reserve, which includes Dudhwa National Park
- Dundwa Range, a subrange of the Siwaliks separating Deukhuri Valley of western Nepal from Balrampur and Shravasti districts in Uttar Pradesh
- Doodawa Village in Sikar district, Rajasthan, India
- Dudhwa Khara, an historic village in Churu district, Rajasthan
- Dudawa Town in Shire of Three Springs, Western Australia
- Dudhwa railway station, Lakhimpur Kheri district, Uttar Pradesh
