= Shuklaphanta National Park =

National park in Nepal

- Nepali: शुक्लाफाँट राष्ट्रिय निकुञ्ज
- IUCN category II (national park)
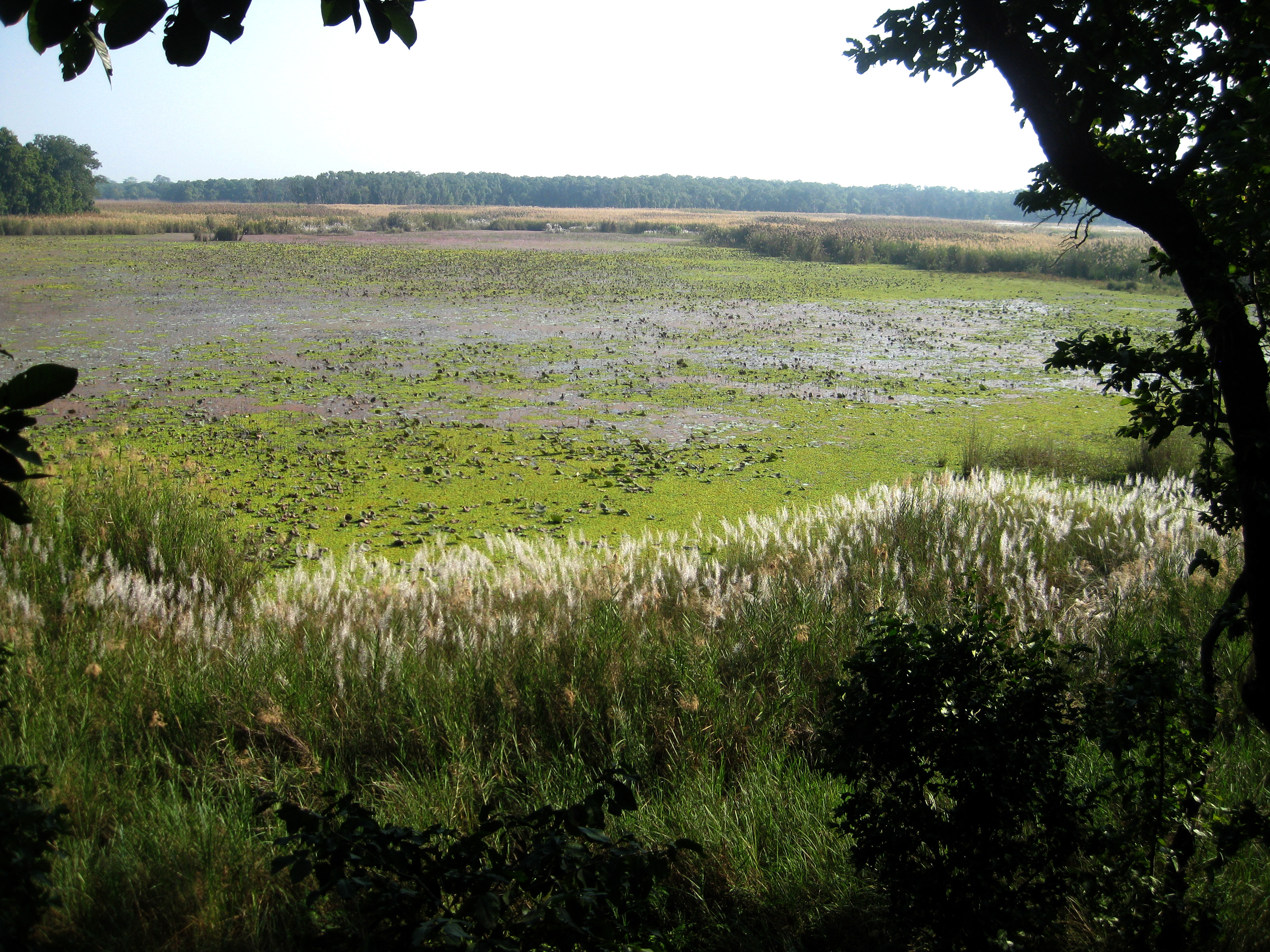
- Rani Tal, a lake inside Shuklaphanta National Park

- Location within Sudurpashchim Province Location within Nepal Location within South Asia
- Interactive map of Shuklaphanta National Park
- Location: Nepal, Sudurpashchim Province
- Nearest city: Bhimdatta
- Coordinates: 28°50′25″N 80°13′44″E
- Area: 305 km^{2} (118 sq mi)
- Established: 1976 as Wildlife Reserve; 2017 as National Park
- Governing body: Department of National Parks and Wildlife Conservation (Nepal)
- Website: shuklaphantanationalpark.gov.np

Shuklaphanta National Park is a national park in the Terai of the Far-Western Region, Nepal, covering 305 km^{2} (118 sq mi) of open grasslands, forests, riverbeds and wetlands at an elevation of 174 to 1,386 m (571 to 4,547 ft). It is bounded by the Mahakali river in the west and south. A small part extends north of the Mahendra Highway to create a wildlife corridor for seasonal migration of wildlife into the Sivalik Hills.

It was gazetted in 1976 as Royal Shuklaphanta Wildlife Reserve and was enlarged to its present size in the late 1980s. A buffer zone of 243.5 km^{2} (94.0 sq mi) was added in 2004. It receives a mean annual rainfall of 1,579 mm (62.2 in) and harbours 700 floral, 456 bird, 56 reptile and 15 amphibian species.

== History ==
The name Shuklaphanta was derived from one of the grasslands called phantas inside the protected area. The main grassland called Shukla Phanta is the largest patch of continuous grassland in Nepal, covering an area of about 16 km^{2} (6.2 sq mi).

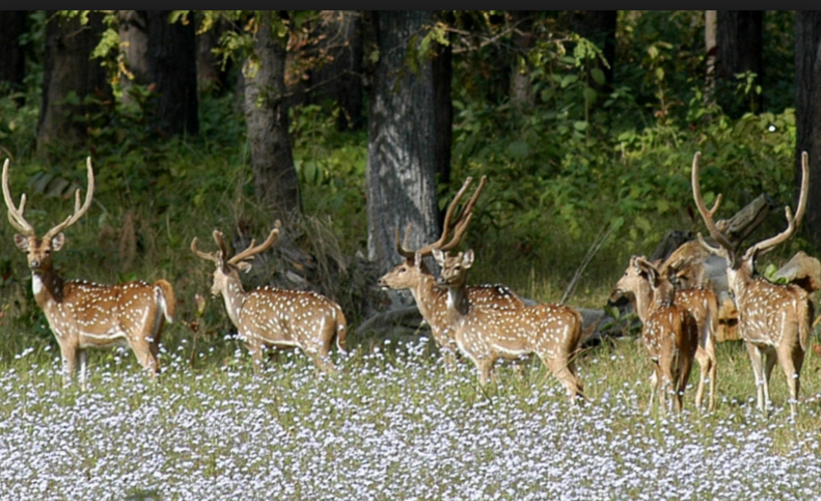
Swamp deer at Shuklaphanta

The area was a favourite hunting ground for Nepal's ruling class and was declared a Royal Hunting Reserve in 1969. In 1973, the area was gazetted as Royal Shukla Phanta Wildlife Reserve, initially comprising 155 km^{2} (60 sq mi), and extended to its present size in the late 1980s. A buffer zone of 243.5 km^{2} (94.0 sq mi) was added in May 2004. In 2017, the status of the protected area was changed to a national park.

== Geography ==
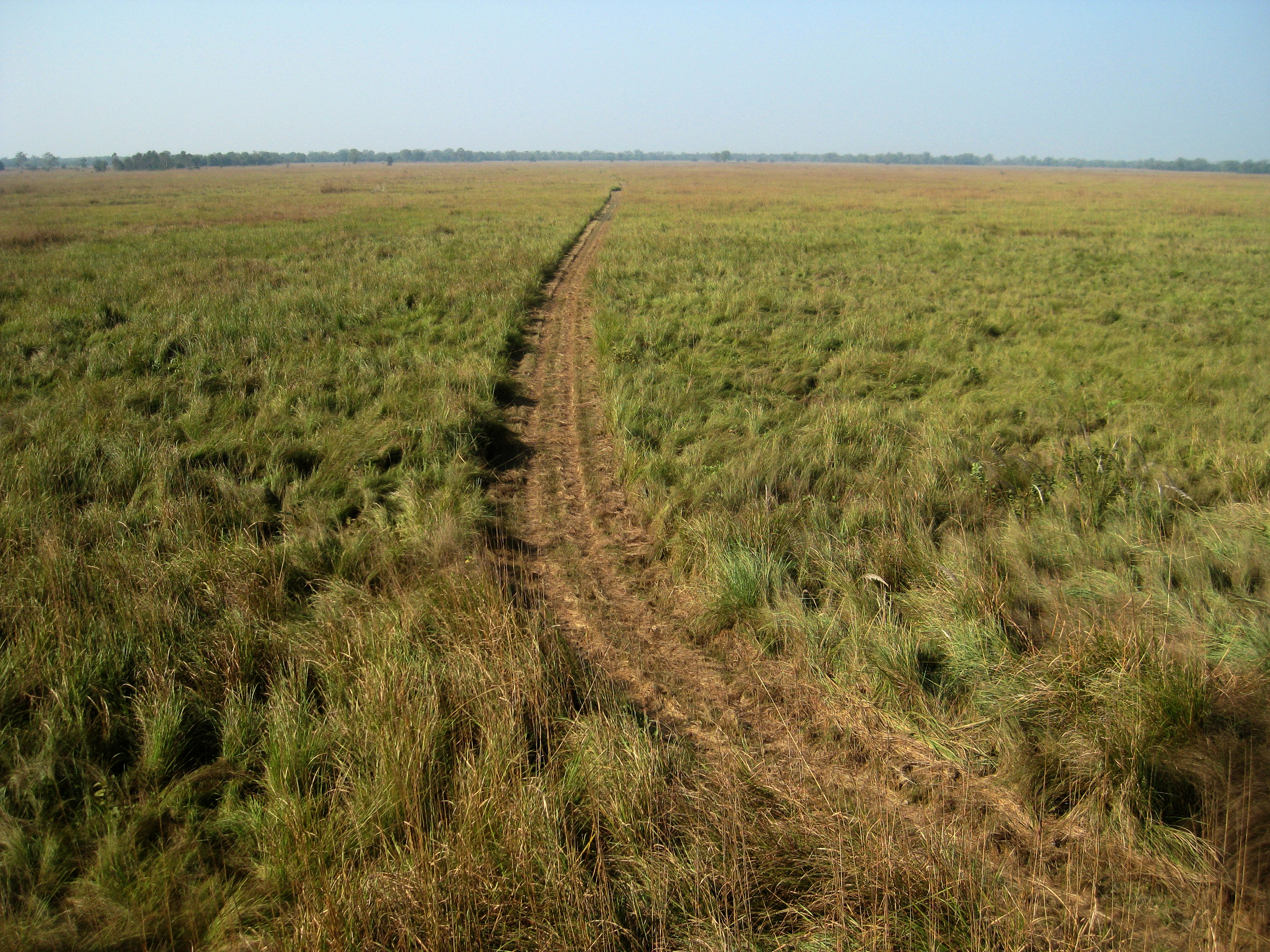
Jeep tracks in the main meadow of Shuklaphanta

Shuklaphanta National Park covers 305 km^{2} (118 sq mi) of open grasslands, forests, riverbeds and tropical wetlands at an elevation of 174 to 1,386 m (571 to 4,547 ft). It is bounded by the Mahakali river in the west, the Mahendra Highway in the north and the Syali river in the east.

A wildlife corridor in the south connects it to Pilibhit Tiger Reserve in India.

Located in the Terai-Duar savanna and grasslands, it is also included in the Terai Arc Landscape. The soils in the alluvial floodplain vary from sandy loam to clay and are slightly alkaline.

=== Climate ===
The climate of the region is subtropical monsoonal with a mean annual rainfall of 1,579 mm (62.2 in) occurring from June to September and peaking in August. The winter months of December and January are fairly cold with daytime temperatures of 7–12 °C (45–54 °F) and occasional frost. The temperature rises from February onward up to 25 °C (77 °F) in March and reaching 42 °C (108 °F) by end of April. Humidity increases when the first pre-monsoon rains arrive in the area in May.

== Flora ==
Some 700 species of flora are estimated in the park including 553 vascular plants, 18 pteridophytes, 410 dicots and 125 monocots. The main grass species in the grasslands are Imperata cylindrica and Heteropogon contortus. Phragmites karka and Saccharum spontaneum grow in the marshes surrounding the seven small lakes. Acacia catechu and Dalbergia sissoo grow alongside rivers, and sal (Shorea robusta) is the dominant tree species in the forest. Grassland encroachment by tree and shrub saplings are major threats to the long-term existence of the main grasslands.

== Fauna ==
The extensive open grasslands and wetlands around the lakes of the park provide habitat for a wide range of fauna.

=== Mammals ===
The congregation of barasingha (Rucervus duvaucelii) in the park's grasslands is the largest known population in the world, with 1674 individuals estimated in 2007. Barasingha and Indian hog deer (Axis porcinus) herds live mainly in grasslands, whereas chital (A. axis) herds use grasslands and forest patches; the Indian muntjac (Muntiacus muntjak) frequents forests close to water bodies, and the nilgai (Boselaphus tragocamelus) uses foremost forest edge areas and semi-open habitats.

During camera trapping surveys carried out in three cold seasons, 11 tigers (Panthera tigris) and nine leopards (P. pardus) were identified in the southern part of the national park. In spring 2016, a rusty-spotted cat (Prionailurus rubiginosus) was photographed by a camera-trap for the first time in the national park. The fishing cat (Prionailurus viverrinus) was recorded mainly in the wetlands. The smooth-coated otter (Lutrogale perspicillata) is present in the many streams and around lakes. Asian palm civet (Paradoxurus hermaphroditus), small Indian civet (Viverricula indica), honey badger (Mellivora capensis) and Bengal fox (Vulpes bengalensis) were recorded in the sal forest.

Indian rhinoceros (Rhinoceros unicornis) were translocated from Chitwan National Park to establish a third viable population in the country. Since 2015, the population in Shuklaphanta National Park has increased from eight to 17 individuals as of March 2021. In 2011, the Asian elephant (Elephas maximus) was thought to migrate seasonally from Uttar Pradesh through the park and beyond, with 3–5 individuals staying in far-western Nepal. The park and its buffer zone provide only about 352 km^{2} (136 sq mi) suitable elephant habitat with sufficient natural vegetation cover close to water sources.

The population of the hispid hare (Caprolagus hispidus) may be of international significance. The population density was estimated at 5.76 individuals/km^{2} (14.9 individuals/sq mi) and 219 ± 40 individuals within 41 km^{2} (16 sq mi) of grasslands in 2012. The Indian crested porcupine (Hystrix indica) was recorded mainly in grasslands and exhibited a nocturnal activity pattern in winter. The Malayan porcupine (H. brachyura) was recorded in the sal forest.

=== Birds ===
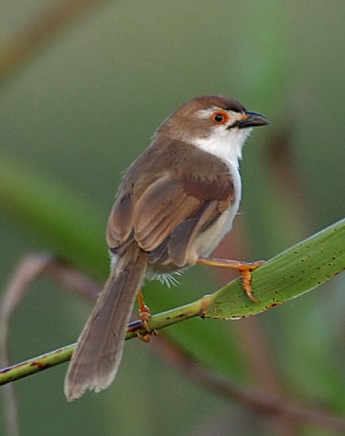
Yellow-eyed babbler

The singing bush lark (Mirafra cantillans) and Finn's weaver (Ploceus megarhynchus) were first observed in the park's grasslands in May 1996. In 2001, the national park supported the largest population of the Bengal florican (Houbaropsis bengalensis) in Nepal with 20–28 individuals estimated to live in the grasslands.

By 2009, a total of 423 bird species had been recorded in the protected area. It is the western limit of several resident birds including swamp francolin (Ortygornis gularis), Jerdon's bush chat (Saxicola jerdoni), Indian grassbird (Graminicola bengalensis), chestnut-capped babbler (Timalia pileata) and Jerdon's babbler (Chrysomma altirostre), and the north-western limit of the yellow-eyed babbler (Chrysomma sinense). Forest birds include Oriental pied hornbill (Anthracoceros albirostris), rufous-bellied eagle (Lophotriorchis kienerii), spot-bellied eagle owl (Bubo nipalensis) and dusky eagle owl (B. coromandus). The forests are also important for great slaty woodpecker (Mulleripicus pulverulentus) and white-naped woodpecker (Chrysocolaptes festivus). The white-rumped vulture (Gyps bengalensis), slender-billed vulture (G. tenuirostris), lesser adjutant (Leptoptilos javanicus), grey-headed fish eagle (Haliaeetus ichthyaetus) and Oriental darter (Anhinga melanogaster) are breeding residents. Sarus crane (Antigone antigone), painted stork (Mycteria leucocephala) and bristled grassbird (Schoenicola striatus) are summer visitors. Greater racquet-tailed drongo (Dicrurus paradiseus), white-capped redstart (Phoenicurus leucocephalus), rusty-tailed flycatcher (Ficedula ruficauda) and rufous-gorgeted flycatcher (F. strophiata) are uncommon winter visitors. The white-throated bush chat (Saxicola insignis) is a winter visitor. The black-necked stork (Ephippiorhynchus asiaticus) and red-headed vulture (Sarcogyps calvus) visit the park occasionally.

A total of 450 bird species had been recorded by mid 2019. Between November 2019 and spring 2020, six additional species were observed comprising little forktail (Enicurus scouleri), wood snipe (Gallinago nemoricola), great barbet (Psilopogon virens), Laggar falcon (Falco jugger), Indian nuthatch (Sitta castanea) and black-breasted thrush (Turdus dissimilis).

=== Reptiles ===
As of September 2019, 56 reptile species have been recorded in Shuklaphanta National Park. The mugger crocodile (Crocodylus palustris) was observed at Rani Tal, one of the natural lakes in the east of the national park. Both Bengal monitor (Varanus bengalensis) and yellow monitor (V. flavescens) have frequently been observed in the national park's buffer zone. Venomous snakes are represented by king cobra (Ophiophagus hannah), Indian cobra (Naja naja) and monocled cobra (N. kaouthia), Russell's viper (Daboia russelii), common krait (Bungarus caeruleus) and banded krait (B. fasciatus). Non-venomous snakes comprise Burmese python (Python bivittatus), Oriental ratsnake (Ptyas mucosa), Ahaetulla laudankia, Ahaetulla nasuta, Forsten's cat snake (Boiga forsteni) and common cat snake (B. trigonata), Chrysopelea ornata, trinket snake (Coelognathus helena) and radiated ratsnake (C. radiatus), bronzeback (Dendrelaphis tristis), rainbow water snake (Enhydris enhydris) and Siebold's water snake (Ferania sieboldii), red sand boa (Eryx johnii) and rough-scaled sand boa (E. conicus), brahminy blind snake (Indotyphlops braminus), Indian wolf snake (Lycodon aulicus), twin-spotted wolf snake (L. jara) and barred wolf snake (L. striatus), banded kukri snake (Oligodon arnensis) and coral kukri snake (O. kheriensis), Psammophis condanarus, Sibynophis sagittarius, buff striped keelback (Amphiesma stolatum) and checkered keelback (Fowlea piscator). Testudines comprise tricarinate hill turtle (Melanochelys tricarinata), Indian black turtle (M. trijuga), Indian roofed turtle (Pangshura tecta), Indian tent turtle (Pangshura tentoria), elongated tortoise (Indotestudo elongata) and Indian narrow-headed softshell turtle (Chitra indica).

The gharial became extinct in the park in 1993, but was reintroduced in March 2024 to the Chaudhar River.

=== Amphibians ===
Asian common toad (Duttaphrynus melanostictus) and marbled toad (D. stomaticus), Euphlyctis cyanophlyctis, Jerdon's bull frog (Hoplobatrachus crassus) and Asian bullfrog (H. tigerinus), Chunam tree frog (Polypedates maculatus) and Terai tree frog (P. taeniatus), grey balloon frog (Uperodon globulosus), marbled balloon frog (U. systoma) and painted globular frog (U. taprobanicus), Minervarya pierrei, M. syhadrensis and M. teraiensis, Microhyla and Sphaerotheca species were recorded between January 2017 and September 2019.

=== Fish ===
As of 2005, 28 fish species have been recorded in the rivers and lakes in the national park.
