= Terai =

Region in northern India and southern Nepal

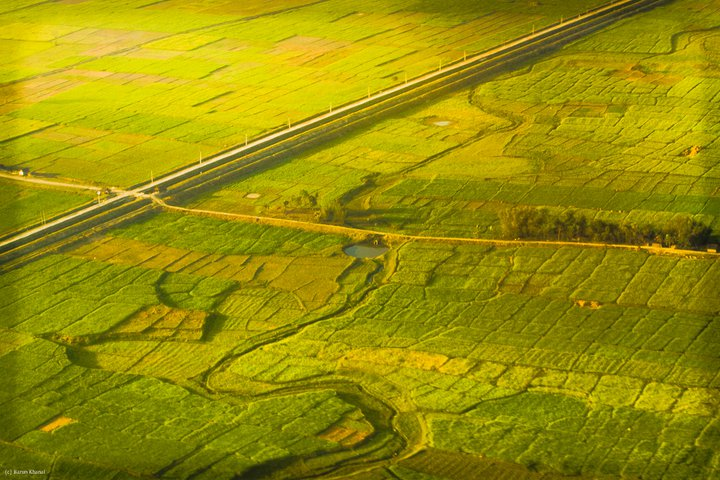
- Aerial view of Terai plains near Biratnagar, Nepal

Ecology
- Realm: Indomalayan realm
- Animals: gharial, mugger crocodile, king cobra
- Bird species: Bengal florican, lesser adjutant, swamp francolin, white-rumped vulture, Oriental darter, sarus crane
- Mammal species: Indian rhinoceros, Asian elephant, gaur, blackbuck, tiger, leopard, jungle cat, fishing cat, leopard cat, smooth-coated otter, large Indian civet, Asian palm civet, small Indian civet, hispid hare

Geography
- Countries: Nepal, India
- Elevation: 67–300 m (220–984 ft)
- Rivers: Sharda River, Karnali River, Gandaki River, Koshi River
- Climate type: tropical savanna climate
- Soil types: alluvial

Conservation
- Global 200: Terai-Duar savanna and grasslands

The Terai or Tarai is a lowland region in parts of southern Nepal and northern India that lies to the south of the outer foothills of the Himalayas, the Sivalik Hills and north of the Indo-Gangetic Plain. This region is characterised by tall grasslands, scrub savannah, sal forests and clay rich swamps. In North India, the Terai spreads from the Yamuna River eastward across Haryana, Uttarakhand, Uttar Pradesh, Bihar and West Bengal. The Terai is part of the Terai-Duar savanna and grasslands ecoregion. Nepal's Terai stretches over 33,998.8 km^{2} (13,127.0 sq mi), about 23.1% of Nepal's land area, and lies at an elevation of between 67 and 300 m (220 and 984 ft). The region comprises more than 50 wetlands. North of the Terai rises the Bhabar, a narrow but continuous belt of forest about 8–12 km (5.0–7.5 mi) wide.

== Etymology ==
The Urdu word ترائی tarāʼī means "lands lying at the foot of a watershed" or "on the banks of a river; low ground flooded with water, valley, basin, marshy ground, marsh, swamp; meadow". In Hindi, the region is called तराई 'tarāī' meaning "foot-hill". In Nepali, the region is called तराइ 'tarāi' meaning "the low-lying land, plain" and especially "the low-lying land at the foot of the Himālayas". It has been described as "low, marshy ground".

== Geology ==
The Terai is crossed by the large perennial Himalayan rivers Yamuna, Ganges, Sarda, Karnali, Narayani and Kosi that have each built alluvial fans covering thousands of square kilometres below their exits from the hills. Medium rivers such as the Rapti rise in the Mahabharat Range. The geological structure of the region consists of old and new alluvium, both of which constitute alluvial deposits of mainly sand, clay, silt, gravels and coarse fragments. The new alluvium is renewed every year by fresh deposits brought down by active streams, which engage themselves in fluvial action. Old alluvium is found rather away from river courses, especially on uplands of the plain where silting is a rare phenomenon.

A large number of small and usually seasonal rivers flow through the Terai, most of which originate in the Sivalik Hills. The soil in the Terai is alluvial and fine to medium textured. Forest cover in the Terai and hill areas has decreased at an annual rate of 1.3% between 1978 and 1979, and 2.3% between 1990 and 1991. With deforestation and cultivation increasing, a permeable mixture of gravel, boulders and sand evolves, which leads to a sinking water table. But where layers consist of clay and fine sediments, the groundwater rises to the surface and heavy sediment is washed out, thus enabling frequent and massive floods during monsoon, such as the 2008 Bihar flood.

== Geography ==
In India, the Terai extends over the states of Haryana, Uttarakhand, Uttar Pradesh, Bihar and West Bengal. These are mostly the districts of these states that are on the India–Nepal border:

- Haryana: Panchkula district
- Uttarakhand: Haridwar district, Udham Singh Nagar district, Champawat district, and Nainital district
- Uttar Pradesh: Pilibhit district, Lakhimpur Kheri district, Bahraich district, Shravasti district, Balrampur district, Gorakhpur district, Kushinagar district, Siddharthnagar district and Maharajganj district
- Bihar: West Champaran district, East Champaran district, Sitamarhi district, Madhubani district, Supaul district, Araria district, Kishanganj district
- West Bengal: Siliguri subdivision of Darjeeling district, Jalpaiguri Sadar subdivision of Jalpaiguri district

=== Inner Terai ===
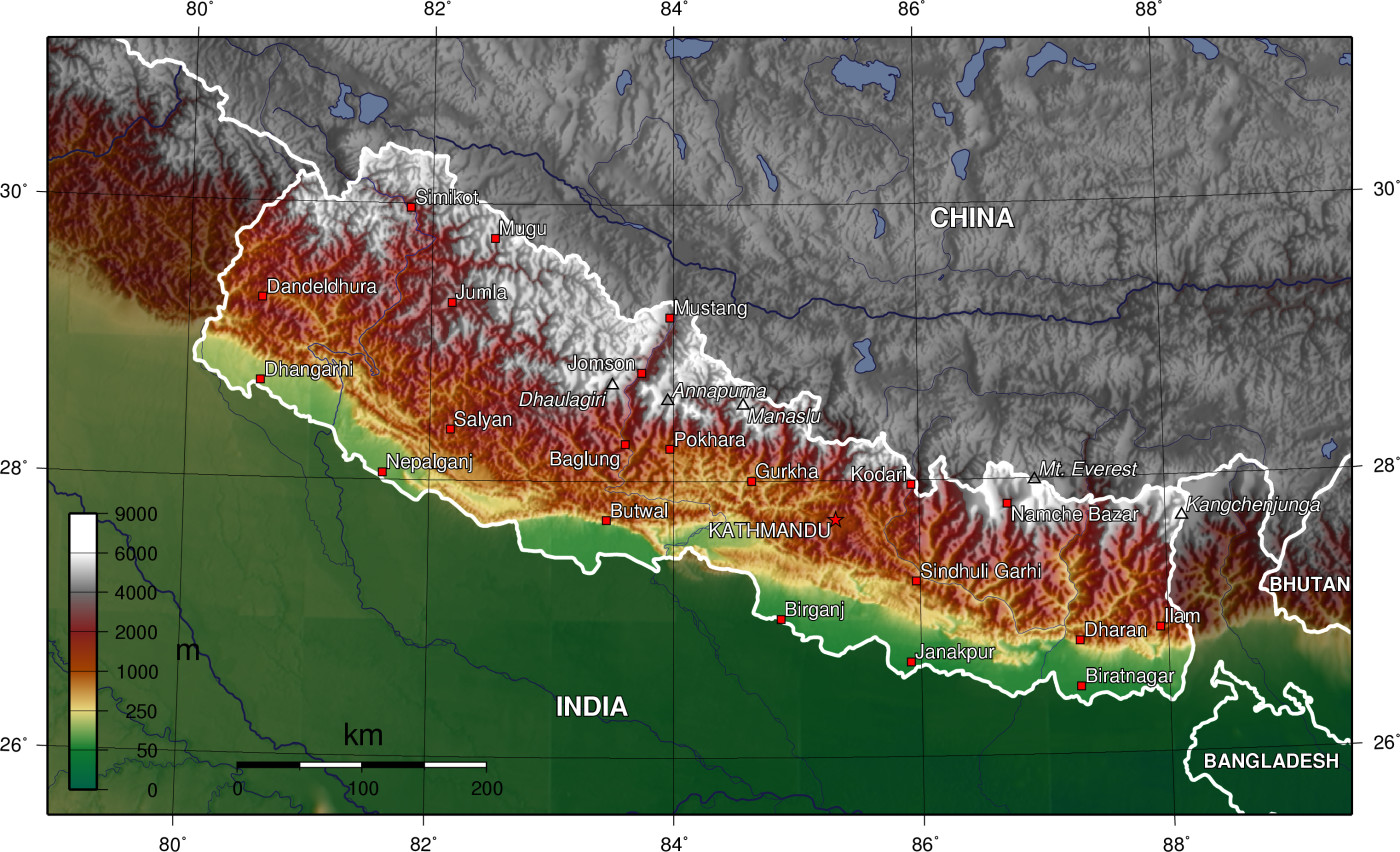
The light green areas indicate the Terai in Nepal

The Inner Terai Valleys of Nepal consists of five elongated valleys located between the lower Himalayan Range and Sivalik Hills. From north-west to south-east these valleys are:

- Surkhet Valley in the Surkhet district, north of the Kailali and Bardiya Districts;
- Dang Valley in the Dang Deokhuri district;
- Deukhuri Valley located south of the Dang Valley;
- Chitwan Valley stretching across the Chitwan and Makwanpur Districts;
- Kamala Valley, also called Udayapur Valley, in the Udayapur District north of the Siraha and Saptari Districts.

=== Outer Terai ===
The Outer Terai begins south of the Sivalik Hills and extends to the Indo-Gangetic Plain. In the Far-Western Region, Nepal, it comprises the Kanchanpur and Kailali Districts; in the Mid-Western Region, Nepal, Bardiya and Banke Districts. Further east, the Outer Terai comprises the Kapilvastu, Rupandehi, Nawalparasi, Parsa, Bara, Rautahat, Sarlahi, Mahottari, Dhanusa, Siraha, Saptari, Sunsari, Morang and Jhapa Districts.

=== Protected areas ===
Several protected areas were established in the Terai since the late 1950s:

- Pilibhit Tiger Reserve
- Sonaripur Wildlife Sanctuary, now Dudhwa National Park in 1958
- Kishanpur Wildlife Sanctuary in 1972
- Chitwan National Park in 1973
- Katarniaghat Wildlife Sanctuary in 1975
- Shuklaphanta Wildlife Reserve in 1976
- Koshi Tappu Wildlife Reserve in 1976
- Udaypur Wildlife Sanctuary in 1978
- Rajaji National Park in 1983
- Parsa National Park in 1984
- Bardia National Park in 1988
- Valmiki National Park in 1989
- Jhilmil Jheel Conservation Reserve in 2005
- Banke National Park in 2010
- Sohagi Barwa Wildlife Sanctuary

== Climate ==
Based on the Köppen–Geiger climate classification system, the Nepal Terai experiences a dry-winter humid subtropical climate (Cwa) with pleasant to warm winters and sweltering summers, a mean annual temperature of 20–28 °C (68–82 °F), and a mean annual rainfall of 1,600–1,800 mm (63–71 in) in the west and 2,500–3,000 mm (98–118 in) in the east.

Biratnagar, 26°N, 87°E

Climate chart (precipitation, max. and min. temperature)
J	F	M	A	M	J	J	A	S	O	N	D
9 23 9	13 26 11	19 32 14	53 34 20	170 33 23	341 33 25	559 32 26	359 33 26	311 32 24	89 31 22	12 28 14	6 25 10
- █ Average max. and min. temperatures in °C
- █ Precipitation totals in mm
- Source: Levoyageur
Imperial conversion
J	F	M	A	M	J	J	A	S	O	N	D
0.4 73 48	0.5 79 52	0.7 90 57	2.1 93 68	6.7 91 73	13 91 77	22 90 79	14 91 79	12 90 75	3.5 88 72	0.5 82 57	0.2 77 50
- █ Average max. and min. temperatures in °F
- █ Precipitation totals in inches

Chandigarh, 30°N, 77°E

Climate chart (precipitation, max. and min. temperature)
J	F	M	A	M	J	J	A	S	O	N	D
38 18 7	37 23 10	27 28 15	18 35 20	27 39 25	147 38 27	276 34 27	273 33 26	155 33 24	14 32 18	5.2 27 12	22 22 8
- █ Average max. and min. temperatures in °C
- █ Precipitation totals in mm
- Source: India Metereological Department
Imperial conversion
J	F	M	A	M	J	J	A	S	O	N	D
1.5 65 45	1.5 73 51	1.1 82 58	0.7 94 69	1.1 101 76	5.8 100 80	11 93 80	11 92 79	6.1 91 76	0.6 90 65	0.2 81 54	0.9 72 46
- █ Average max. and min. temperatures in °F
- █ Precipitation totals in inches

== Ethnic groups ==
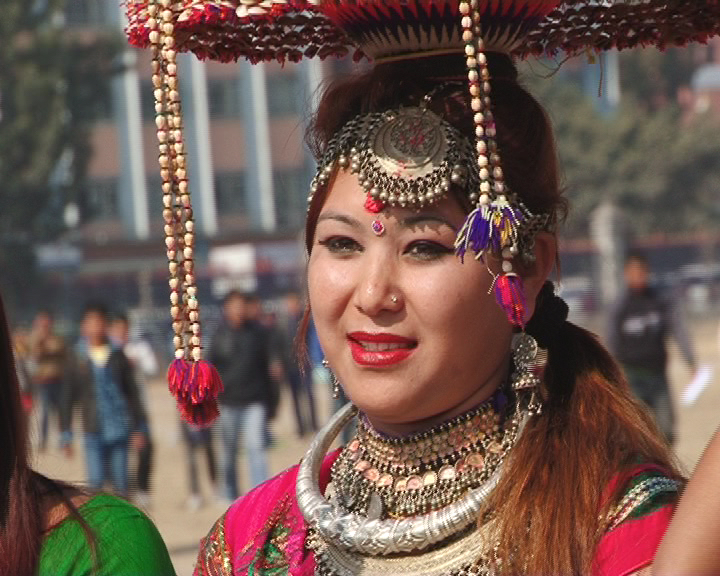
Tharu people of Terai

Tharu and Dhimal people are the indigenous inhabitants of the Terai. Several Tharu subgroups are scattered over most of the Nepal and Indian Terai. They used to be semi-nomadic, practised shifting cultivation and collected wild fruits, vegetables and medicinal herbs. They have been living in the Terai for many centuries and reputedly had an innate resistance to malaria. Dhimal reside in the eastern Nepal Terai, viz Sunsari, Morang and Jhapa Districts. In the past, they lived in the fringes of the forest and conducted a semi-nomadic life to evade outbreaks of diseases. Today, they are subsistence farmers.

The Bhoksa people are indigenous to the western Terai in the Indian Kumaon division.

Maithils inhabit the Indian Terai in Bihar and the eastern Terai in Nepal. Bhojpuri people reside in the central and eastern Terai, and Awadhi people live in the central and western Terai. Bantawa people reside foremost in two districts of the eastern Terai in Nepal.

Following the malaria eradication program using DDT in the 1960s, a large and heterogeneous non-Tharu population settled in the Nepal Terai. Pahari people from the mid-hills including Bahun, Chhetri and Newar moved to the plains in search of arable land. In the rural parts of the Nepal Terai, distribution and value of land determine economic hierarchy to a large extent. High caste migrants from the hills and traditional Tharu landlords who own agriculturally productive land constitute the upper level of the economic hierarchy. The poor are the landless or near landless Terai Dalits, including the Musahar, Chamar and Mallaah. Several Chepang people also live in Nepal's central and eastern Terai districts. As of June 2011, the human population in the Nepal Terai totalled 13,318,705 people in 2,527,558 households comprising more than 120 different ethnic groups and castes such as Badi, Chamling, Ghale, Kumal, Limbu, Magar, Muslim, Rajbanshi, Teli, Thakuri, Yadav and Majhi speaking people.

== History ==
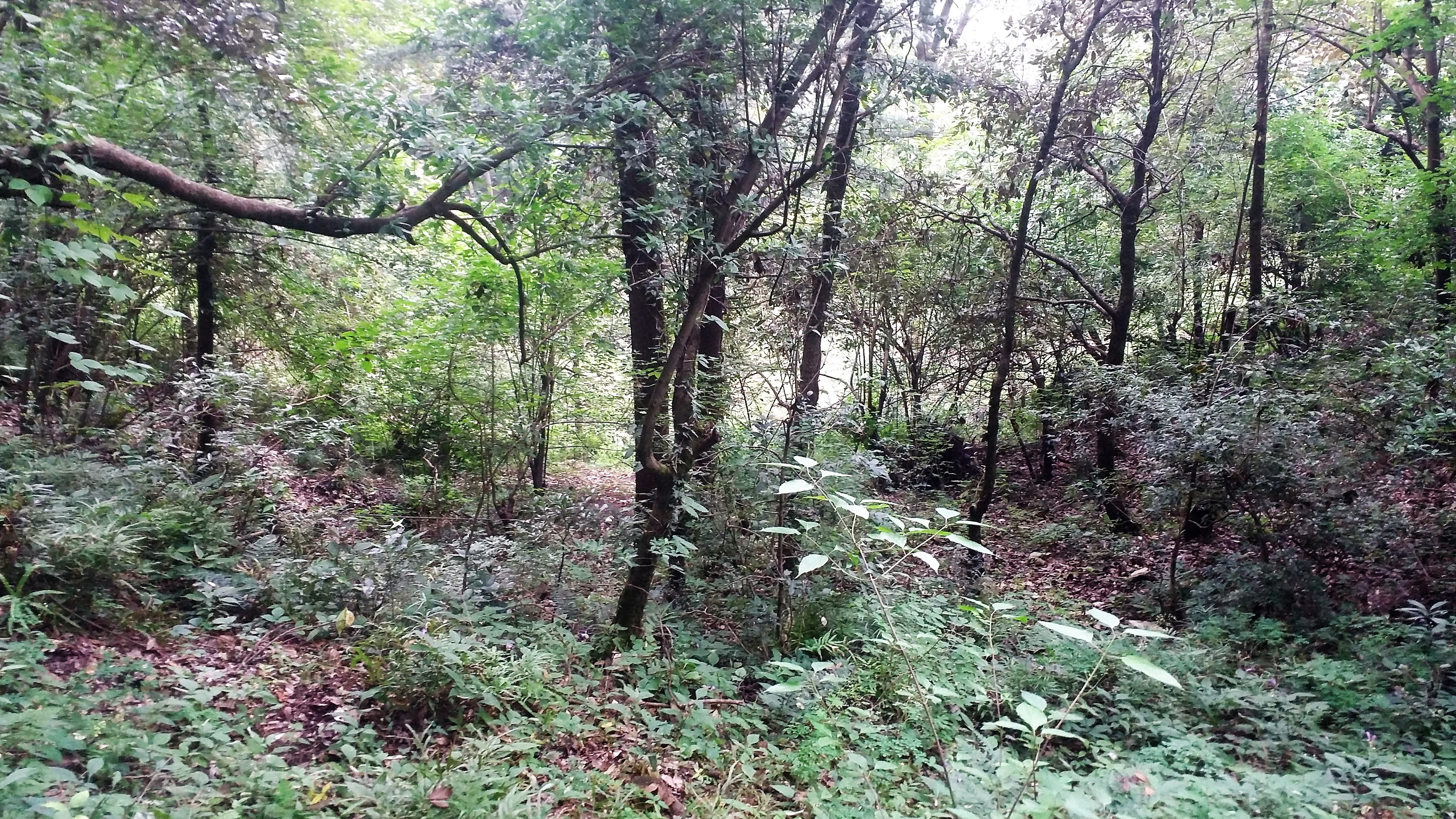
Jungle in Uttarakhand

The Muslim invasion of northern India during the 14th century forced Hindu and Buddhist people to seek refuge from religious persecution. Rajput nobles and their entourage migrated to the Himalayan foothills and gained control over the region from Kashmir to the eastern Terai during the following three centuries.

By the 16th century, the rulers of Palpa and Makwanpur controlled the mid-western Terai and extended this control to the eastern Terai by the 17th century. They controlled the area of today's districts of Saptari, Siraha, Dhanusa, Mahottari and Sarlahi. The rulers of Makwanpur controlled the central Terai region of present-day Nepal, and the rulers of Vijayapur controlled today's Sunsari, Morang and Jhapa Districts. The Shah dynasty conquered the eastern Nepal Terai in the 1770s. They also conquered land in the eastern Terai that belonged to the Kingdom of Sikkim. The Tulsipur State, in the Dang Valley of Nepal's western Terai, was also an independent kingdom until it was conquered in 1785 by Bahadur Shah of Nepal during the unification of Nepal. Until the mid 18th century, the Nepal Terai was divided into several smaller kingdoms, and the forests and wild places were, largely, left undisturbed. Since the late 18th century, however, the Shah rulers encouraged Indians to settle in the Terai, and supported famine-stricken Bihari farmers in efforts to convert to a more productive agricultural lifestyle in the eastern Nepal Terai. From at least 1786 onward, they appointed government officers in the eastern Terai districts of Parsa, Bara, Rautahat, Mahottari, Saptari and Morang to levy taxes, collect revenues and maintain civil order, as well as to hunt wild game, including Indian elephants and Indian rhinoceros, mostly for their ivory. At the end of the 18th century, between 200 and 300 elephants were caught annually, using snares or nooses.

The far-western and mid-western regions of the Nepal Terai (called 'Naya Muluk', or 'new country') lay on the northern periphery of the Awadh dynasty. After Nepal lost the Anglo–Nepalese War of 1816, the British annexed these regions of the Terai when the Sugauli Treaty was ratified; as a reward for Nepal's military aid in the Indian Rebellion of 1857, they returned some of this region in 1860, namely today's districts of Kanchanpur, Kailali, Banke and Bardiya. To promote economic development of the Nepal Terai, people from the hills were invited to settle in the region. Since only a few moved to the Terai, Indian people were further encouraged to settle. Immigration of Indian people increased between 1846 and 1950. They settled in the eastern Nepal Terai, living in close proximity with native Terai peoples.

The Indian Terai remained largely uninhabited until the end of the 19th century, as it was arduous and dangerous to penetrate the dense marsh- and malaria-filled jungle with its predators. Dacoit gangs retreated to the Terai jungles, and the area was considered lawless and wild by the British, who sought control of the region's valuable timber reserves. The region was densely forested with stands of foremost Sal.

Heavy logging began in the 1920s. Extracted timber was exported to India to collect revenues. Cleared areas were subsequently used for agriculture. But still, the Terai jungles were teeming with wildlife.

Inner Terai valleys historically were agriculturally productive but extremely malarial. Some parts were left forested by official decree during the Rana dynasty as a defensive perimeter called Char Kose Jhadi, meaning 'four kos forest'; one kos equals about 3 km (1.9 mi). A British observer noted, "Plainsmen and paharis generally die if they sleep in the Terai before November 1 or after June 1." British travelers to Kathmandu went as fast as possible from the border at Raxaul to reach the hills before nightfall.

Malaria was eradicated using DDT in the mid-1950s, at the unfortunate expense of future generations of birds, especially vultures, which were especially sensitive to the chemical. Subsequently, people from the hills migrated to the Terai. About 16,000 Tibetan refugees settled in the Nepal Terai in 1959–1960, followed by refugees of Nepali origin from Burma in 1964, from Nagaland and Mizoram in the late 1960s, and about 10,000 Bihari Muslims from Bangladesh in the 1970s. Timber export continued until 1969. In 1970, King Mahendra granted land to loyal ex-army personnel in the districts of Jhapa, Sunsari, Rupandehi and Banke Districts, where seven colonies were developed for resettling about 7,000 people. They acquired property rights over uncultivated forest and 'waste' land, thus accelerating the deforestation process in the Terai. Between 1961 and 1991, the annual population growth in the Terai was higher than the national average. Deforestation continued, and forest products from state-owned forest were partly smuggled to India. Community forestry was introduced in 1995. Since the 1990s, migration from the Terai to urban centres is increasing and causing sociocultural changes in the region.

== Politics ==
Since the early 1950s, several political parties advocated for autonomy and independence of the Nepal Terai, such as the Nepal Terai Congress and Janatantrik Terai Mukti Morcha. Several armed groups were formed, which pursued this aim using violent means. In 2013, more than 24 Madheshi political parties were registered for the Constituent Assembly of Nepal election.

=== Border disputes ===
The most significant border dispute of the Indo-Nepal boundary in the Terai region is the Susta area. In the Susta region, 14,500 hectares of land is under dispute but recent development has manage to discuss it bilaterally.

=== Indian influence in Nepal Terai ===
After the 2008 Nepalese Constituent Assembly election, Indian politicians kept on trying to secure strategic interests in the Nepal Terai, such as over hydropower energy, development projects, business and trade. The government of Nepal has accused India of imposing an undeclared blockade in 2015 but it is not clear yet, local peoples blame Nepal administration and government.

=== Humanitarian works ===
Dhurmus Suntali Foundation handed over an integrated community containing 50 houses to Musahar community of Bardibas at a cost of Rs. 63 million.

== Economy ==
=== Economy in Nepal Terai ===
The Terai is the most productive region in Nepal with the majority of the country's industries. Agriculture is the basis of the economy. Major crops include rice, wheat, maize, potato, peas, lentil, mustard, sugar cane, ginger, turmeric, cardamom, garlic and chili. Fruits comprise mango, lychee, guava, papaya, banana and jackfruit. The Terai is also known for beekeeping and honey production, with about 120,000 colonies of Apis cerana.

In Jhapa District, tea has been cultivated since 1960; the annual production of 2005 was estimated at 10.1 million kg.

=== Economy in Indian Terai ===
Tea cultivation was introduced in the Darjeeling Terai in 1862.
