= Bedanand Jha =

Nepalese politician

Bedananda Jha

Personal details
- Party: Nepal Terai Congress

Bedananda Jha (Nepali: वेदानन्द झा) was a Nepalese politician. In 1951 he founded the Nepal Terai Congress, seeking autonomy for the Terai region. Later he became an important politician during the panchayat period. He was a cabinet minister at several times. Jha was also chairman of the Back to the Village National Campaign and ambassador to India.

Jha died on January 21, 2006. He was chairman of the Rajsabha standing committee at the time.
