= Suhelva Sanctuary =

Wildlife sanctuary in India

Coordinates: 27.855°N 82.101°E

Suhelva Wildlife Sanctuary
- IUCN category IV (habitat/species management area)
- Location within Uttar Pradesh Location within India
- Interactive map of Suhelva Wildlife Sanctuary
- Location: Balrampur, Gonda and Sravasti districts, Uttar Pradesh, India
- Area: 452
- Established: 1998

Suhelva Sanctuary is a wildlife sanctuary located in Balrampur, Gonda and Sravasti districts of the state of Uttar Pradesh in India. It is about 66 km from Balrampur, 120 km from Gonda and about 210 km from Lucknow. It covers an area of 452 square kilometers.

== History ==
The forest is one of the oldest forests in Uttar Pradesh and was given the status of a wildlife sanctuary in 1998.

== Access ==
=== By air ===
Lucknow Airport is located 230 km from Suhelva. Varanasi Airport is located about 350 km from the sanctuary.

=== By rail ===
The nearest railway station from Suhelva is Tulsipur about 20 km from the sanctuary.

=== By road ===
Suhelva is well connected by roads to every part of the state.

== Flora ==
The Sal, Sheesham, Khair, Sagaun (Teak), Asna, Jamun, Haldu, Phaldu, Dhamina, Jhingan and Bahera trees make up the forest cover of the sanctuary.

== Fauna ==
The main mammals of Suhelva are Bengal tiger, Indian leopard, sloth bear, antelope and deer. Other animals include fox, hyena, Indian elephant and wild cat.

== See also ==
- Chuka
- Dudhwa National Park
