= Dudhwa railway station =

Railway Station in Uttar Pradesh, India

- Indian Railways logo

General information
- Location: Uttar Pradesh; India
- Coordinates: 28.509°N 80.6732°E
- Elevation: 164 metres (538 ft)
- System: Indian Railways station
- Owner: Indian Railways
- Operator: North Eastern Railway
- Line: Mailani-Bahraich-Gonda Section
- Platforms: 1
- Tracks: 3 (Single Diesel MG)
- Connections: Auto stand

Construction
- Structure type: Standard (on ground station)
- Platform levels: Low Level

Other information
- Status: Functioning
- Station code: DDW
- Zone(s): North Eastern Railway
- Division(s): Lucknow NER

History
- Opened: 1890 (131 Years Ago)
- Closed: No
- Rebuilt: No
Location
- Location within India Location within Uttar Pradesh

Dudhwa railway station is a small junction railway station in Lakhimpur Kheri district, Uttar Pradesh. Its code is DDW. It is located in Dudhwa National Park, near Dudhwa village and Palia Kalan city. The station consists of one platform. The platform is not well sheltered. It lacks many facilities including water and sanitation.
