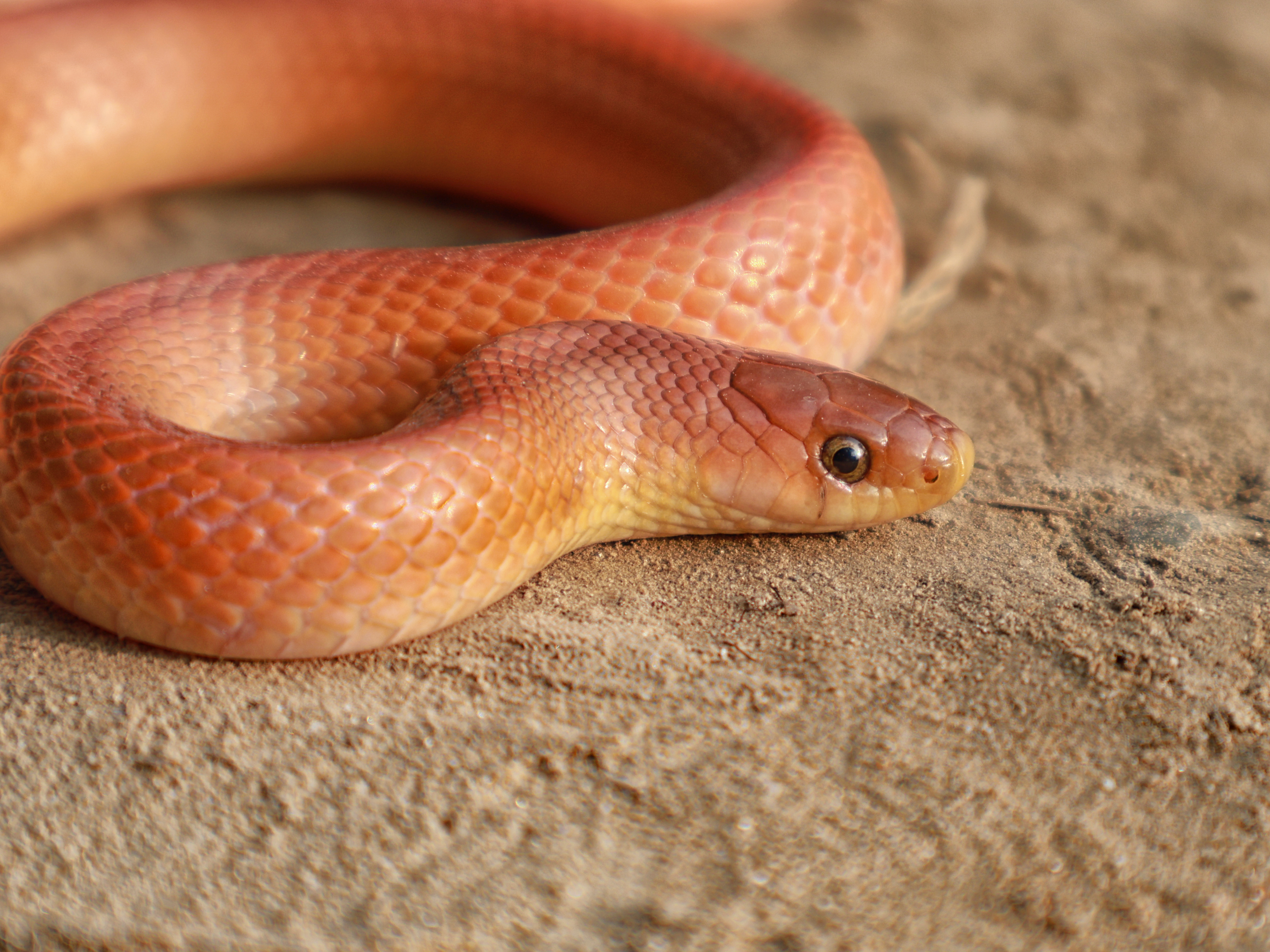

Conservation status
- Least Concern (IUCN 3.1)

Scientific classification
- Kingdom: Animalia
- Phylum: Chordata
- Class: Reptilia
- Order: Squamata
- Suborder: Serpentes
- Family: Colubridae
- Genus: Oligodon
- Species: O. kheriensis

Binomial name
- Oligodon kheriensis Acharji and Ray, 1936

= Oligodon kheriensis =

Red coral kukri snake

Species of snake

Oligodon kheriensis, also known as the coral red kukri snake, is a Kukri snake that was first described in 1936 from the North Kheri Division in Uttar Pradesh, India.

== Characteristics ==
The coral kukri snake is bright orange to coral red coloured. The species can be distinguished from O. cyclurus by the following characters: (1) higher number of ventral scales: 196 vs. 159–178 VEN in O. cyclurus; (2) uniform dorsum vs. reticulated or blotched (or blotched and striped) in O. cyclurus, and (3) the absence of the large, arrow-like cephalic and nape marking in O. kheriensis. O. kheriensis is also geographically isolated from Oligodon cyclurus.

== Distribution and habitat ==
Oligodon kheriensis was known from only two specimens. The first was found in the Kheri Division of Uttar Pradesh, India, and another was found in Mahendranagar in western Nepal. In 2002, one individual was recorded in the vicinity of the Chitwan National Park in Nepal. In 2021, it was recorded from Panchagarh, Bangladesh.

In 2014 and 2015, dead specimens were found in Nainital district of Uttarakhand. It was also seen in Katarniaghat Wildlife Sanctuary in Bahraich district of Uttar Pradesh in July 2012. In the recent past the snake was sighted in Sonaripur range of Dudhwa Tiger Reserve in 2018. Subsequently, Field Director Dudhwa Tiger Reserve sighted it in Majhgai Range of North Kheri Division in June 2019. In August 2020, an Oligodon kheriensis was rescued from a residential house in Nainital district of Uttarakhand.

== Ecology and behaviour ==
Little is known of the ecology of the coral kukri snake. It is thought to be nocturnal and living underground most of the time, and that it can dig using its rostral scales. It probably preys on earth worms and larvae.

== Conservation ==
In India, Oligodon kheriensis is protected under the Wildlife Protection Act of 1972, Schedule IV.
