= Katarniaghat Wildlife Sanctuary =

Wildlife sanctuary in Uttar Pradesh, India

- IUCN category IV (habitat/species management area)
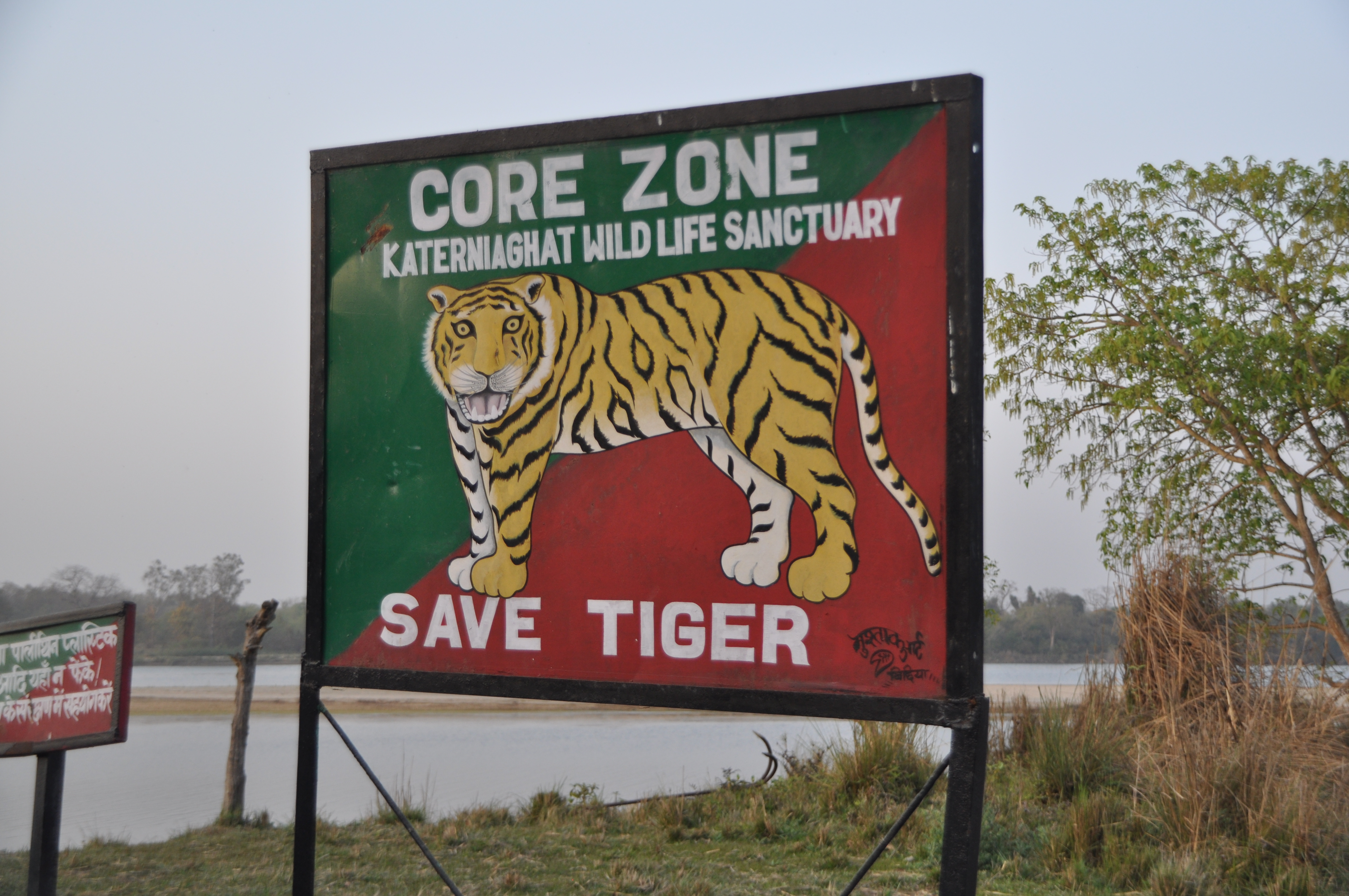
- Signboard in Katarniaghat Wildlife Sanctuary, Bahraich, UP.

- Location within Uttar Pradesh Location within India
- Interactive map of Katarniaghat Wildlife Sanctuary
- Location: On the banks of Sarayu river Bahraich district, Uttar Pradesh, India
- Nearest city: Bahraich City (103 km)
- Coordinates: 28°19′N 81°07′E
- Area: 400.6 square kilometres (99,000 acres)
- Established: 1975 (51 years ago)
- Governing body: Ministry of Forest and Wildlife of Uttar Pradesh

Katarniaghat Wildlife Sanctuary is a wildlife sanctuary in the Upper Gangetic plain, near Bahraich city in Bahraich district of Uttar Pradesh, India and covers an area of 400.6 km^{2} (154.7 sq mi) in the Terai of the Bahraich district. It was established in 1975. In 1987, it was brought under the purview of the Project Tiger, and together with the Kishanpur Wildlife Sanctuary and the Dudhwa National Park it forms the Dudhwa Tiger Reserve. It is part of the Terai Elephant Reserve.

== Fauna ==
Katarniaghat Wildlife Sanctuary is located in the Gangetic plains. The sanctuary consists of mixed deciduous forest with sal trees. It is home to many wild animals including chital, hog deer, wild boar, tiger, elephant, leopard, jackal, langur, porcupine and otter. It hosts many reptiles, including mugger crocodile, gharial, rock phython and king cobra. In 2012, a red coral kukri snake was sighted in the sanctuary. This snake was first described from the North Kheri district in 1936.

In 2025, there were 131 leopards in the sanctuary.
