= Nepal Terai Congress =

Nepal Terai Congress was a political party in Nepal. The party was founded in 1951 (74 years ago) by Vedanand Jha, with the objective of seeking autonomy for the Terai.

The party was founded after a split from the Nepali Congress.

The party called for the recognition of Hindi, as the lingua franca of the Terai. The government, however, was unwilling to recognise Hindi. Instead it stated that there were several languages spoken in the Terai, such as Maithili, Bhojpuri, Awadhi and Tharu.
