= Pilibhit Tiger Reserve =

Tiger reserve in Uttar Pradesh, India

- IUCN category IV (habitat/species management area)
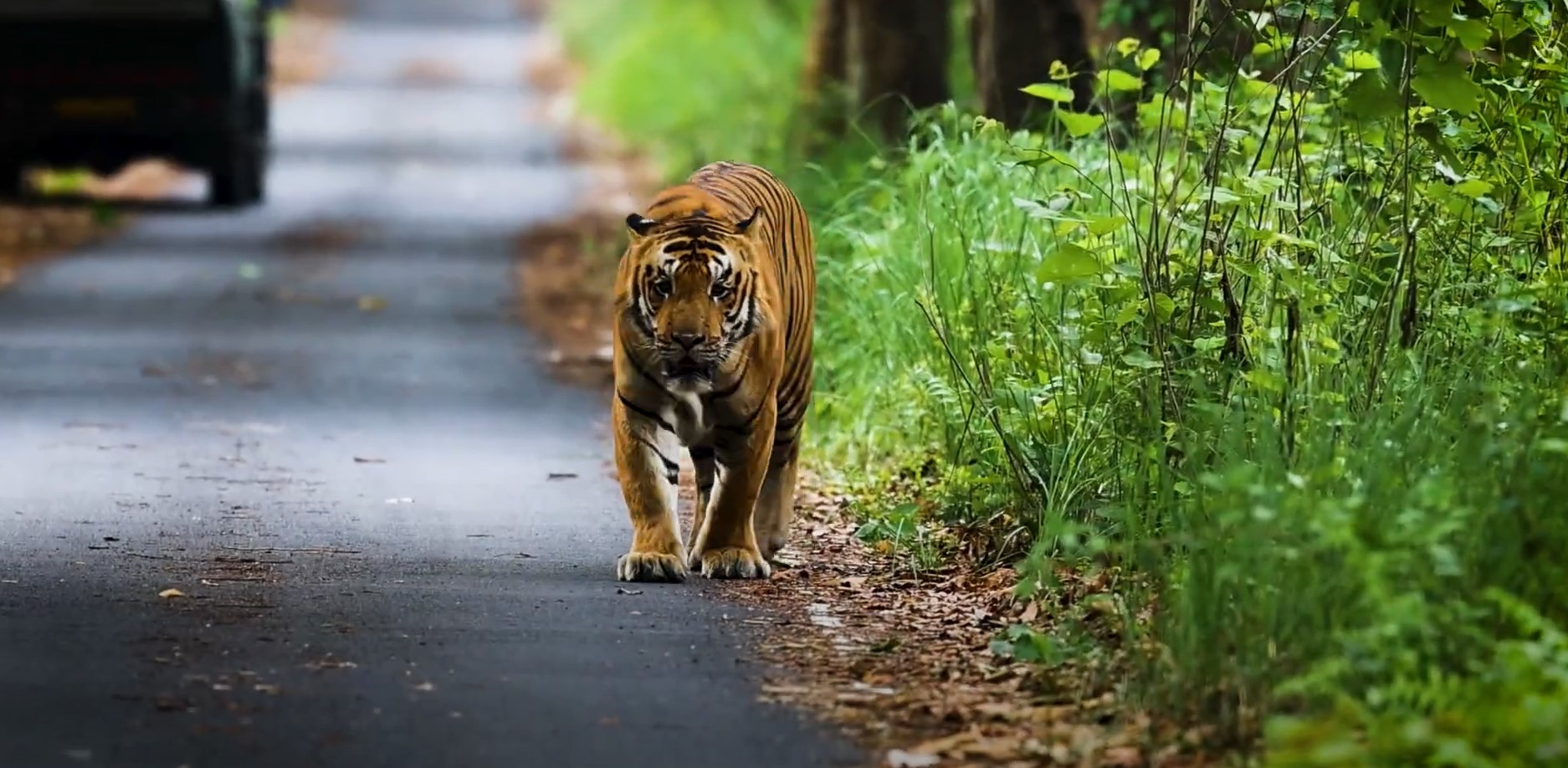
- Tiger walking on the road at Pilibhit tiger reserve
- Interactive map of Pilibhit Tiger Reserve
- Location: Pilibhit District
- Nearest city: Pilibhit
- Area: 730.24 km^{2} (281.95 sq mi)
- Max. elevation: 172 m (564 ft)
- Established: 09-Jun-2014; 12 years ago
- Designated: 09 June 2014
- Visitors: 38,183 (in 2024)
- Governing body: NTCA
- Website: pilibhittigerreserve.in

Pilibhit Tiger Reserve is a tiger reserve located in Pilibhit district of Uttar Pradesh, which was notified as a tiger reserve in 2014. It forms part of the Terai Arc Landscape in the upper Gangetic Plain along the India-Nepal border. The habitat is characterised by sal forests, tall grasslands and swamp maintained by periodic flooding from rivers. The Sharda Sagar Dam extending up to a length of 22 km (14 mi) is on the boundary of the reserve.

Pilibhit is one of the few well-forested districts in Uttar Pradesh. According to an estimate of the year 2018, Pilibhit district has over 800 km^{2} (310 sq mi) forests, constituting roughly 23% of the district’s total area. Forests in Pilibhit have at least 65 tiger and a prey including five species of deer. The tiger reserve got the first International award TX2 for doubling the tiger population in a stipulated time.

== History ==
A proposal to create a dedicated home for the endangered cats in Pilibhit forests was sent to the government of India in April 2008. Later, Pilibhit Tiger Reserve was accepted in September 2008 on the basis of its special type of ecosystem with vast open spaces and sufficient feed for the elegant predators. Then it was declared as the 46th tiger reserve in June 2014. Before this the protected area used to be a timber yielding reserve forest. In 2020, Pilibhit Tiger Reserve have bagged the global award TX2, for doubling the number of tigers in a short span of just four years against a target of 10 years. Among other 13 tiger range countries, Pilibhit Tiger Reserve was the first to receive this prestigious award.

== Geography ==
The Pilibhit tiger reserve located between latitudes from 28°8’0”N to 28° 50’0”N & longitudes 79° 53’02”E to 80° 18’03”E majorly the upper Gangetic Plain Biogeographic land that falls under Pilibhit district. Tiger reserve's proximity to River Sharda in the north-east and the River Ghaghara in the south-west makes it an ideal place for wildlife. Pilibhit Tiger Reserve consists of a core area of 602.79 km^{2} (232.74 sq mi) and a buffer area of 127.45 km^{2} (49.21 sq mi) in its periphery. The core area is restricted for human habitation, but there is some amount of disturbance due to traffic on roads passing through the reserve, people collecting forest resources and livestock grazing. A wildlife corridor links Pilibhit Tiger Reserve with Jim Corbett National Park, Kishanpur Wildlife Sanctuary and Dudhwa National Park, and Shuklaphanta National Park in Nepal.

=== Reserve's boundaries ===
- Northern Boundary: From Pilibhit-Bankati road to Mahof up to Uttarakhand boundary along Indo-Nepal border up to international pillar no. 17. From Indo-Nepal border pillar no. 17 to pillar no. 28
- Eastern Boundary: From Indo-Nepal pillar no. 28 along the boundary of Bifurcation Forest Block, Barahi Forest Block and Navadiya forest Block of Barahi Forest Range and up to the boundary of Navadiya Forest Block, Haripur Forest Block and Dakka Forest Block of Haripur Range.
- Southern boundary: From the Reserve Forest boundary of Haripur Range up to the Reserve Forest boundary of Barahi range, Mahof range, Mala Range and Dioria range.
- Western boundary: From the Reserve Forest boundary of Pasgaon Compartment 6 and Ramnagar Compartment no. 1 of Dioria Range along the Reserve Forest Boundary of Banganj Compartment no. 5, Gada Compartment no, 130, Ghamela Compartment no. 119 of Mala range up to Bankati.

== Climate ==
Pilibhit Tiger Reserve experiences climatic variations across the year. April–June can be dry and warm, whereas July to September is humid and warm. During December to February, days are cold and dry, but nights are colder and full of dew.

Climate data for Pilibhit Tiger reserve
| Month | Jan | Feb | Mar | Apr | May | Jun | Jul | Aug | Sep | Oct | Nov | Dec | Year |
|---|---|---|---|---|---|---|---|---|---|---|---|---|---|
| Mean daily maximum °C (°F) | 14 (57) | 19 (66) | 21 (70) | 36 (97) | 40 (104) | 42 (108) | 40 (104) | 36 (97) | 34 (93) | 29 (84) | 20 (68) | 11 (52) | 29 (83) |
| Mean daily minimum °C (°F) | 4 (39) | 10 (50) | 13 (55) | 23 (73) | 31 (88) | 34 (93) | 32 (90) | 27 (81) | 24 (75) | 20 (68) | 13 (55) | 6 (43) | 20 (68) |
| Average rainfall mm (inches) | 7.6 (0.3) | 23 (0.9) | 30 (1.2) | 46 (1.8) | 81 (3.2) | 120 (4.8) | 130 (5.2) | 140 (5.5) | 110 (4.3) | 30 (1.2) | 23 (0.9) | 13 (0.5) | 753.6 (29.8) |

== Flora ==

Pilibhit Tiger Reserve harbours North Indian tropical moist deciduous forests with sal, moist Bhabar dhun sal, moist mixed deciduous, alluvial savannah woodland, and Northern tropical dry deciduous forests with dry Shivalik sal, dry bamboo brakes, Shivalik chir pine forests, grasslands and old plantations. In general, the vegetation consists of sal and mixed forests, interspersed with grasslands and riparian vegetation. There are more than 110 tree and 51 shrub species. The habitat is characterized by open meadows (chaurs) interspersed with sal and moist mixed deciduous forests. The grasslands are locally known as ‘Chaur’, which are an outcome of abandoned settlements or past clearings. Owing to their anthropogenic origin, these meadows are gradually getting colonized by gregarious woody species.

There are several old plantations of the sixties and seventies, which include species like teak, Eucalyptus, Ailanthus, Terminalia alata (Asna), Lagerstroemia parviflora (Asidha), Adina cordifolia (Haldu), Mitragyna parviflora (Faldu), Gmelina arborea (Gahmhar), Holoptelea intgrifolia (Kanju), Acacia catechu (Khair), Pterocarpus marsupium (Vija sal), Kydia calyina (Poola), Lannea coromandelica (Jhigan) and Toona ciliate (Toon). Others include: Murraya koenigii (Kath neem), Grawia hirsute (Van Tulsi), Malloutus phillipensis (Rohni) and grasses like -Phragmites karka (Narkul), Cynodon dactylon (Doob), Vetiveria zizanioides (Khaskhas) and Erianthus munj (Moonj). However, such plantations are largely confined to the buffer area of the reserve. Several invasive weeds like Lantana and Cannabis are prevalent in the habitat. The forest patches are interspersed with grass meadows with several species like Sacchrum, Sclerostachya, Imperata, Themeda, Bothriochloa, Vetiveria, Apluda, Dichanthium, Digitaria and Cyperus.

== Fauna ==
Tortoise at Pilibhit Tiger Reserve

In spring 2010, a rusty-spotted cat was recorded by camera traps for the first time. Other mammal species present in Pilibhit Tiger Reserve include a large number of Bengal tiger, leopard cat, Indian elephant, barasingha, tiger, leopard, fishing cat, barking deer, Four-horned antelope, blackbuck, chital, hog deer, sambar, sloth bear, Indian giant flying squirrel, porcupine, small Indian civet, Indian flying fox, short nosed fruit bat, Indian common yellow bat, painted bat, rhesus macaque, langur, golden jackal, Bengal fox and hyena.

The 450 resident bird species include Sarus crane, three hornbill species and six of eagle species, white-rumped vulture, grey partridge, black partridge, swamp francolin, darter, lesser whistling duck, Indian pitta, combed duck, peafowl, herons, red junglefowl, cormorants, egrets. Reptiles are represented by marsh crocodile, gharial, five lizard species and several snake species including Indian rock python, king cobra, and common krait. The river system in Pilibhit Tiger Reserve harbour about 79 fish species.
