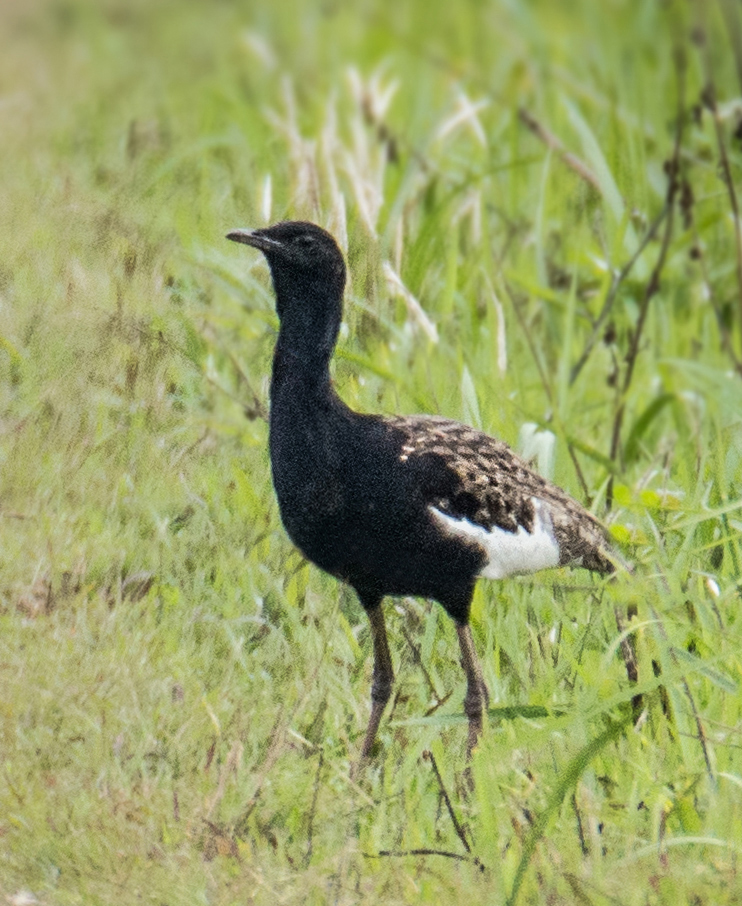
- A male Bengal florican

Conservation status
- Critically Endangered (IUCN 3.1)
- CITES Appendix I

Scientific classification
- Kingdom: Animalia
- Phylum: Chordata
- Class: Aves
- Order: Otidiformes
- Family: Otididae
- Genus: Houbaropsis; Sharpe, 1893
- Species: H. bengalensis

Binomial name
- Houbaropsis bengalensis (Müller, PLS, 1776)

Synonyms
- Eupodotis bengalensis (Gmelin, 1789)

= Bengal florican =

Species of bird

The Bengal florican (Houbaropsis bengalensis), also called the Bengal bustard, is a bustard species native to the Indian subcontinent, Cambodia, and Vietnam. It is listed as Critically Endangered on the IUCN Red List because fewer than 1,000 individuals were estimated to be alive as of 2017. It is the only member of the genus Houbaropsis.

== Description ==
The male Bengal florican has a black plumage from the head and neck to underparts. Its head carries a long lanky crest, and the neck has elongated display plumes. The upperside is buff with fine black vermiculations and black arrowhead markings, and there is a conspicuous large white patch from the wing coverts to the remiges. In flight, the male's wings appear entirely white except for the dark primary remiges. The feet and legs are yellow, the bill and irides are dark. The female is buff-brown similar to the males' back with a dark brown crown and narrow dark streaks down the side of the neck. Her wing coverts are lighter than the remiges and covered in fine dark barring. Immature Bengal floricans look like a female. Adult Bengal floricans range from 66–68 cm (26–27 in) in length and stand around 55 cm (22 in) tall. The female is larger than the male and weighs around 1.7–1.9 kg (3.7–4.2 lb) against a weight of 1.2–1.5 kg (2.6–3.3 lb) in males.

They are normally silent but, when disturbed, utter a metallic chik-chik-chik call. Displaying males croak and produce a deep humming sound.

The only bird even remotely similar to adult males of the Bengal florican is the lesser florican (Sypheotides indica). This is a smaller, slimmer-necked bustard overall, and its males have cheek-tufts of plumes with pennant-like tips rather than the crest, and a white band between neck and back. The females are similar, and young Bengal floricans can be easily mistaken for female lesser floricans. The latter has almost white wing coverts however, resembling the males' wing patch.

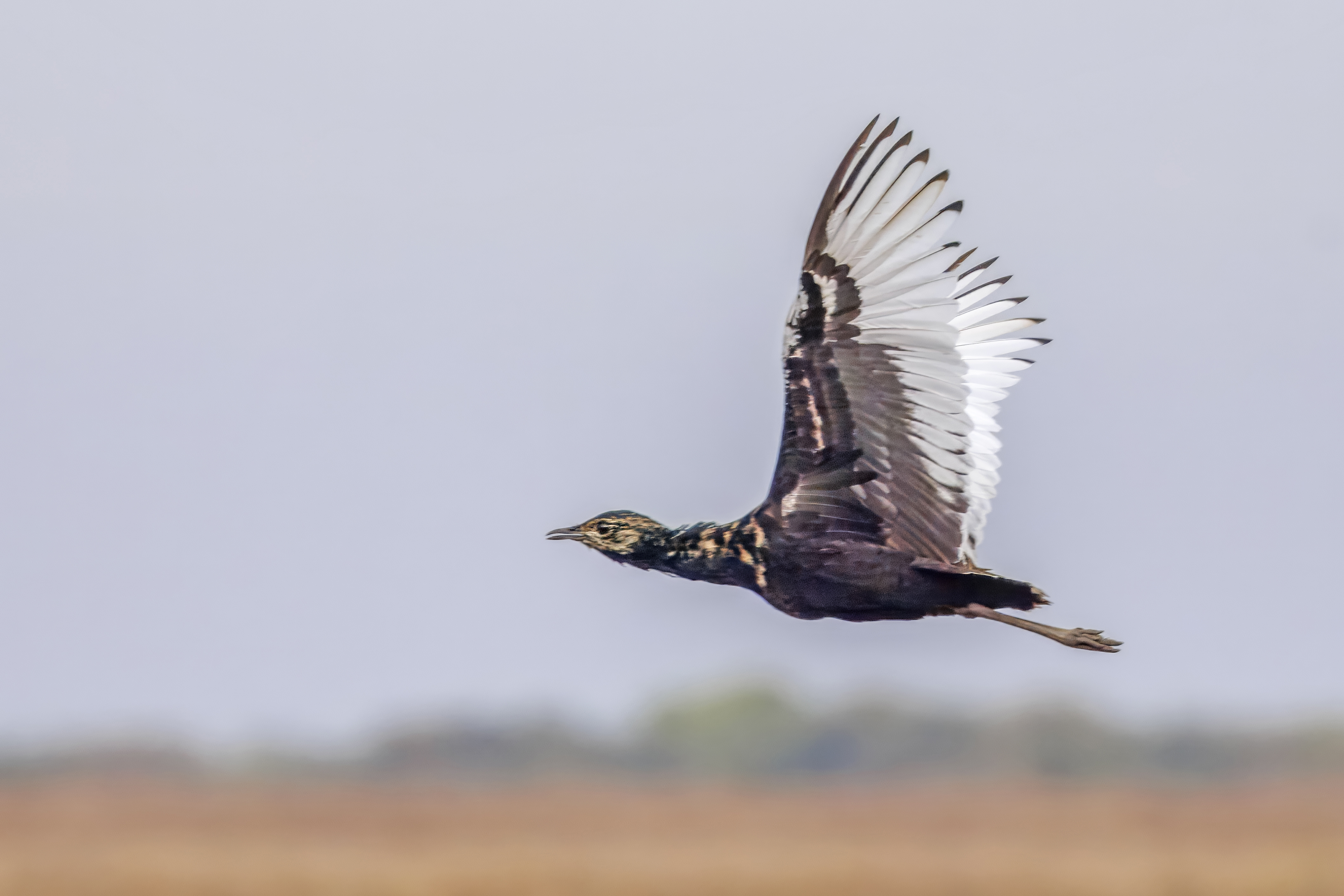
Male H. b. blandini
Tonlé Sap, Cambodia

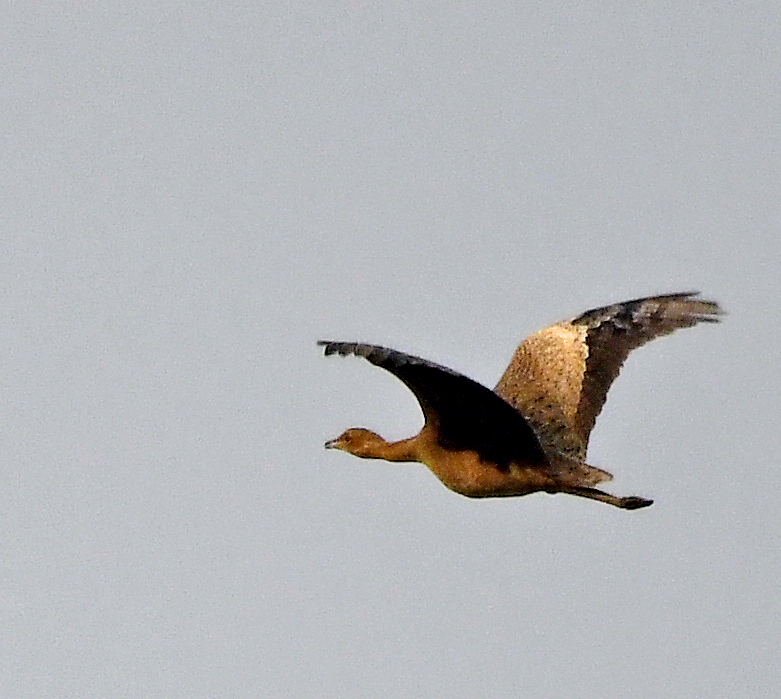
Female
Manas National Park, Assam, India

== Distribution and habitat ==
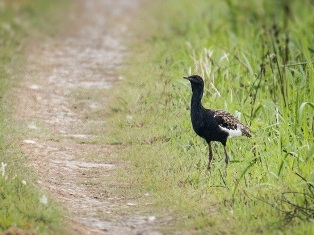
Bengal florican at Orang National Park, Assam, India

The Bengal florican has two disjunct populations. One occurs from Uttar Pradesh through the Terai of Nepal to Assam and Arunachal Pradesh in India, and historically to Bangladesh. The other occurs in Cambodia and perhaps adjacent southern Vietnam. It is mostly resident on its breeding grounds; around Tonlé Sap in Cambodia however, the birds use grasslands near the lake to breed, and move away from the water in the wet season when the breeding grounds are flooded. Similarly, the Terai population seems to move to warmer lowland locations in winter. Migrations are not long-distance, however, and probably are restricted to a few dozen kilometers.

Bengal floricans live in open tall grassland habitats with scattered bushes. The most important grass species are satintails Imperata, in particular Cogongrass I. cylindrica), sugarcane (Saccharum, in particular Kans Grass S. spontaneum), munj grass (Tripidium bengalense), as well as Desmostachya bipinnata. The birds are usually encountered in the early mornings and evenings and are most easily spotted in the breeding season from March to August, which is when most censuses of the population are conducted. Particular between March and May, when they give their stunning courtship display, males are far more conspicuous than the cryptically-coloured females, which moreover prefer high grassland rich in sugarcane.

== Status and conservation ==
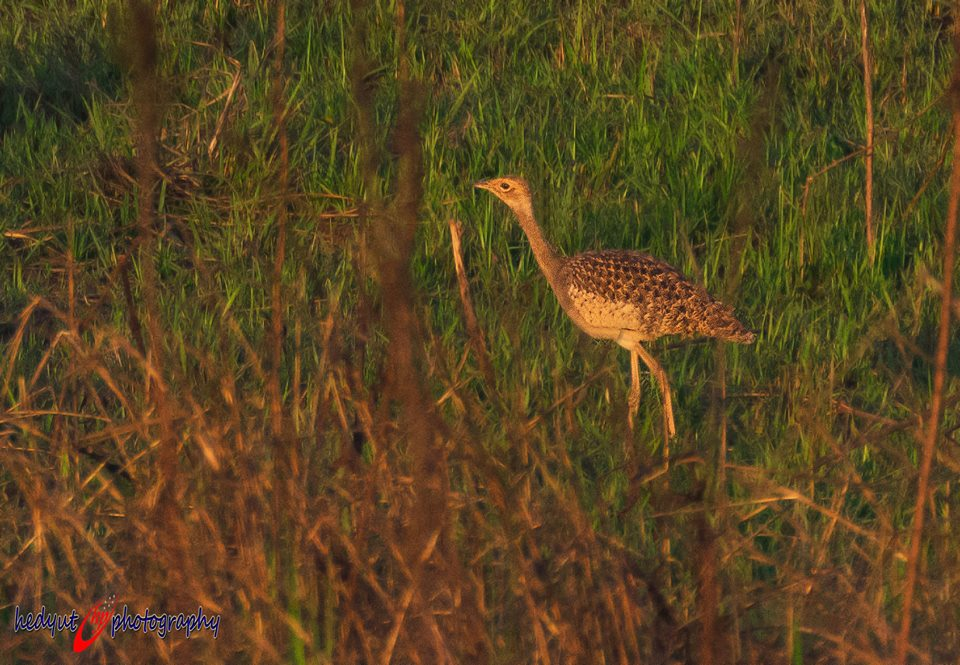
Female at Manas National Park

Restricted to tiny fragments of grassland scattered across South and Southeast Asia, the Bengal florican is the world's rarest bustard. It is known to have become increasingly threatened by land conversion for intensive agriculture, particularly for dry season rice production. Poaching continues to be a problem in Southeast Asia, while the South Asian population is down to less than 350 adult birds, about 85% of which are found in India. Though more threatened, birds in Southeast Asia may number as many as in South Asia but more probably closer to or even less than 1,000 adults.

=== India ===
The population has decreased dramatically in past decades. It may be that in India the decline is coming to a halt and that stocks in Dibru-Saikhowa and Kaziranga National Parks and Dudhwa Tiger Reserve are safe at very low levels. Still, its global status is precarious and it was consequently uplisted from Endangered to Critically Endangered in the 2007 IUCN Red List.

=== Cambodia ===
In Cambodia, it is mostly found in Kampong Thom Province; lesser numbers are found in Siem Reap Province and remnants might persist in Banteay Meanchey, Battambang and Pursat Provinces. Its rate of decline there has accelerated in the early 21st century. The government of Cambodia has taken a significant step towards protecting important habitat for the Bengal florican. Along with 350 square kilometres (140 sq mi) being designated as "Integrated Farming and Biodiversity Areas", where land-use practices are adapted to also benefit the Bengal florican, a public education program to inform schoolchildren about the bird has also been undertaken. At present, the species may persist in the Ang Trapaing Thmor Crane Sanctuary and perhaps Vietnam's Tràm Chim National Park, but the South Asian population is not known with certainty from any protected areas.

=== Nepal ===
In Nepal, it is essentially restricted to protected areas, namely Shuklaphanta, Bardia and Chitwan National Parks. Since 1982, the Shuklaphanta and Bardia populations appear to have been stable, but the Chitwan population has declined. In 2001, 20–28 birds were estimated in Shuklaphanta, 6–10 birds in Bardia, and 6–22 birds in Chitwan. It has been absent from Koshi Tappu Wildlife Reserve, since 1990, and has not been sighted around the Koshi Barrage since the 1980s. In spring 2007, 8–9 males were recorded in Sukla Phanta and 16–18 birds estimated; one male was sighted in Bardia and 2–4 estimated; five males were sighted in Chitwan and 10–14 estimated. The overall Nepalese population declined by 30% between 2001 and 2007. Seventeen individuals were recorded along the Koshi River in the spring of 2011.

The courtship display of males has been discussed by many naturalists travelling British India, and in the modern era attracts tourists who provide revenue to locals. Studies indicate that the Bengal florican is not a particularly shy or hemerophobic species, its apparent intolerance of human settlements being chiefly due to its intolerance of land clearance for agriculture. Pastures and the traditional use of common land for villagers' tall-grass harvest (for construction and handicraft) actually seem to be tolerated quite well by the birds.

Woody plant encroachment contributes to habitat loss in countries like Nepal and India. In particular, sal (Shorea robusta) and saj (Terminalia elliptica) have been identified as trees that encroach upon the florican's habitat in Nepal. If firewood and timber are collected from grassland rather than from forests, such human land use can therefore benefit the species. The species decline in Bardia National Park is probably chiefly due to insufficient use of trees that overgrow grassland. A sustainable land management technique that will bolster Bengal florican stocks consists of harvesting grass and particularly wood from changing tracts of land, leaving some areas unharvested each year and setting aside a few additional ones as reserve land, where grasses can grow tall for years until they are harvested. Controlled burning may be necessary when woodland encroachment is strong; it should take place before March so that the year's offspring are not harmed. A landscape ecology approach, integrating social, biological and physical environmental elements at scales compatible with management objectives, will be needed to effectively conserve Bengal floricans and their grassland habitats.
