= Banke National Park =

National Park of Nepal

- Nepali: बाँके राष्ट्रिय निकुञ्ज
- IUCN category II (national park)
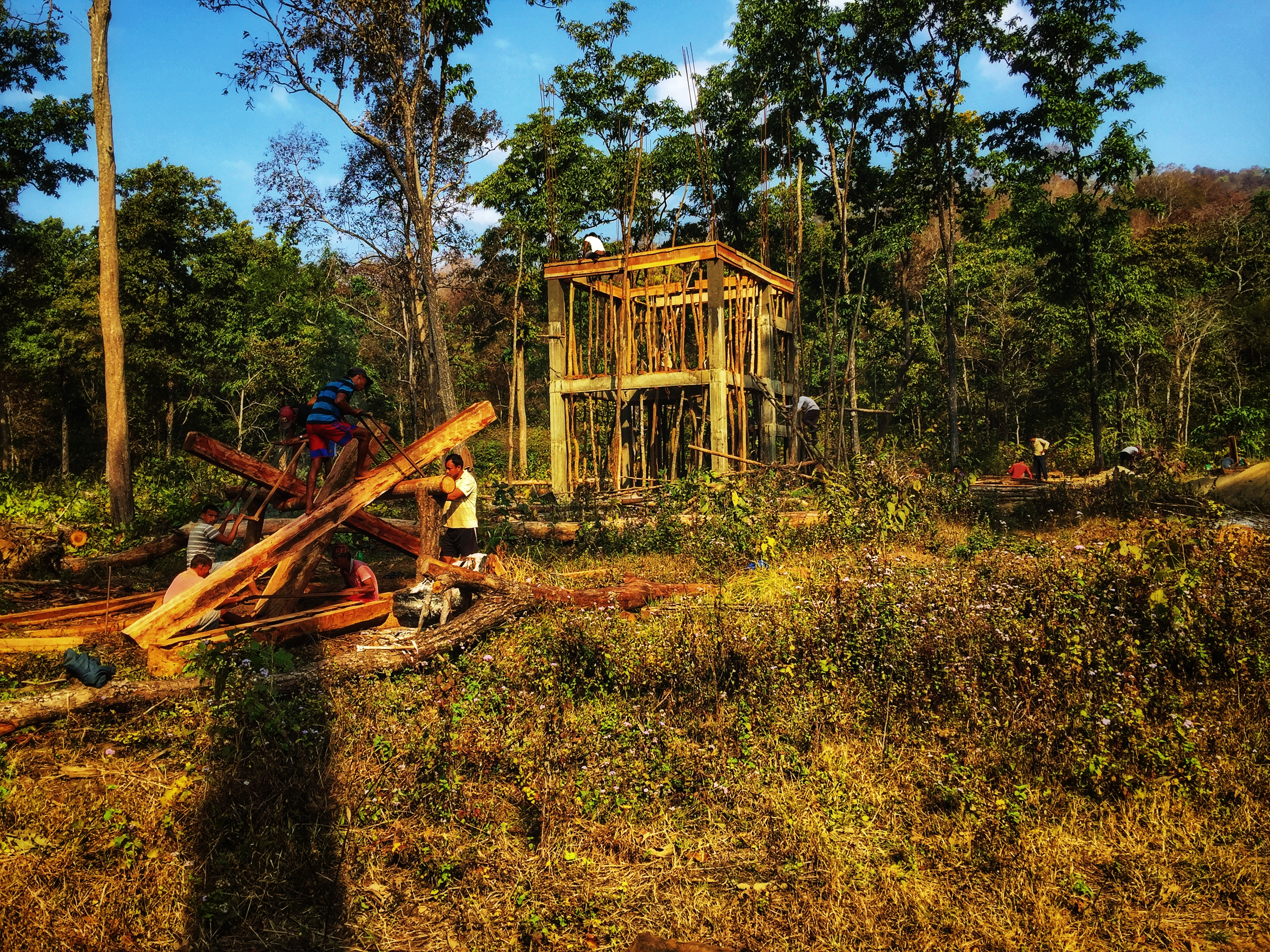
- Location in Nepal

- Location within Lumbini Province Location within Nepal Location within South Asia
- Location: Nepal
- Nearest city: Kohalpur
- Coordinates: 28.1911°N 81.9128°E
- Area: 550 km^{2} (210 sq mi)
- Established: 12 July 2010
- Governing body: Department of National Parks and Wildlife Conservation

Banke National Park is located in the Lumbini Province and was established in 2010 as Nepal's tenth national park after its recognition as a "Gift to the Earth". The protected area covers an area of 550 km^{2} (210 sq mi) with most parts falling in the Sivalik Hills. The park is surrounded by a buffer zone of 344 km^{2} (133 sq mi) in the districts of Banke, Salyan and Dang Deukhuri Districts.

Together with the neighbouring Bardia National Park, the coherent protected area of 1,518 km^{2} (586 sq mi) represents the Tiger Conservation Unit (TCU) Bardia-Banke.

== Vegetation ==
The vegetation in Banke National Park is composed of at least 113 tree species, 107 herbal species and 85 shrub and climber species. Common species include sal, axlewood, Semecarpus anacardium, khair, andTerminalia alata.

== Fauna ==
Banke National Park holds Bengal tigers and four-horned antelopes. In 2014, a ruddy mongoose was recorded for the first time in the national park.
