= Dudhwa Tiger Reserve =

Protected area in Uttar Pradesh, India

- IUCN category IV (habitat/species management area)
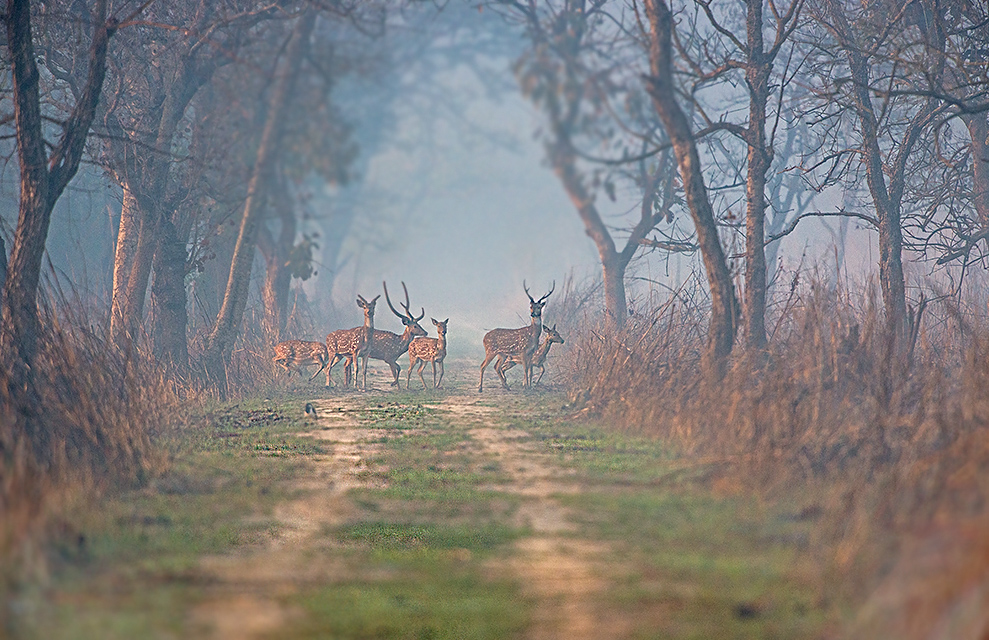
- Dudhwa Tiger Reserve

- Location within Uttar Pradesh Location within India
- Location: Lakhimpur Kheri and Bahraich districts, Uttar Pradesh, India
- Coordinates: 28°31′N 80°41′E
- Area: 1,284.3 km^{2} (495.9 sq mi)
- Established: 1987

The Dudhwa Tiger Reserve is a protected area in Uttar Pradesh that stretches mainly across the Lakhimpur Kheri and Bahraich districts and comprises the Dudhwa National Park, Kishanpur Wildlife Sanctuary and Katarniaghat Wildlife Sanctuary. It covers an area of 1,284.3 km^{2} (495.9 sq mi). Three large forested areas are extant within the reserve, although most of the surrounding landscape is agricultural. It shares the north-eastern boundary with Nepal, which is defined to a large extent by the Mohana River. It ranges in altitude from 110 to 185 m (361 to 607 ft), and several streams flow through the reserve from the northwest across the alluvial plain that encompasses the reserve.

== History ==
The Dudhwa National Park and the Kishanpur Wildlife Sanctuary were designated as Dudhwa Tiger Reserve in 1987 as part of Project Tiger. The Katarniaghat Wildlife Sanctuary was added in the year 2000. It is one of India's 53 Tiger Reserves.

== Fauna ==
The protected area is home for the Bengal tiger, Indian Leopard, Asiatic black bear, sloth bear, swamp deer, Indian Rhinoceros, Indian elephant, chital, hog deer, barking deer, sambar, wild boar and hispid hare.

=== Tigers ===
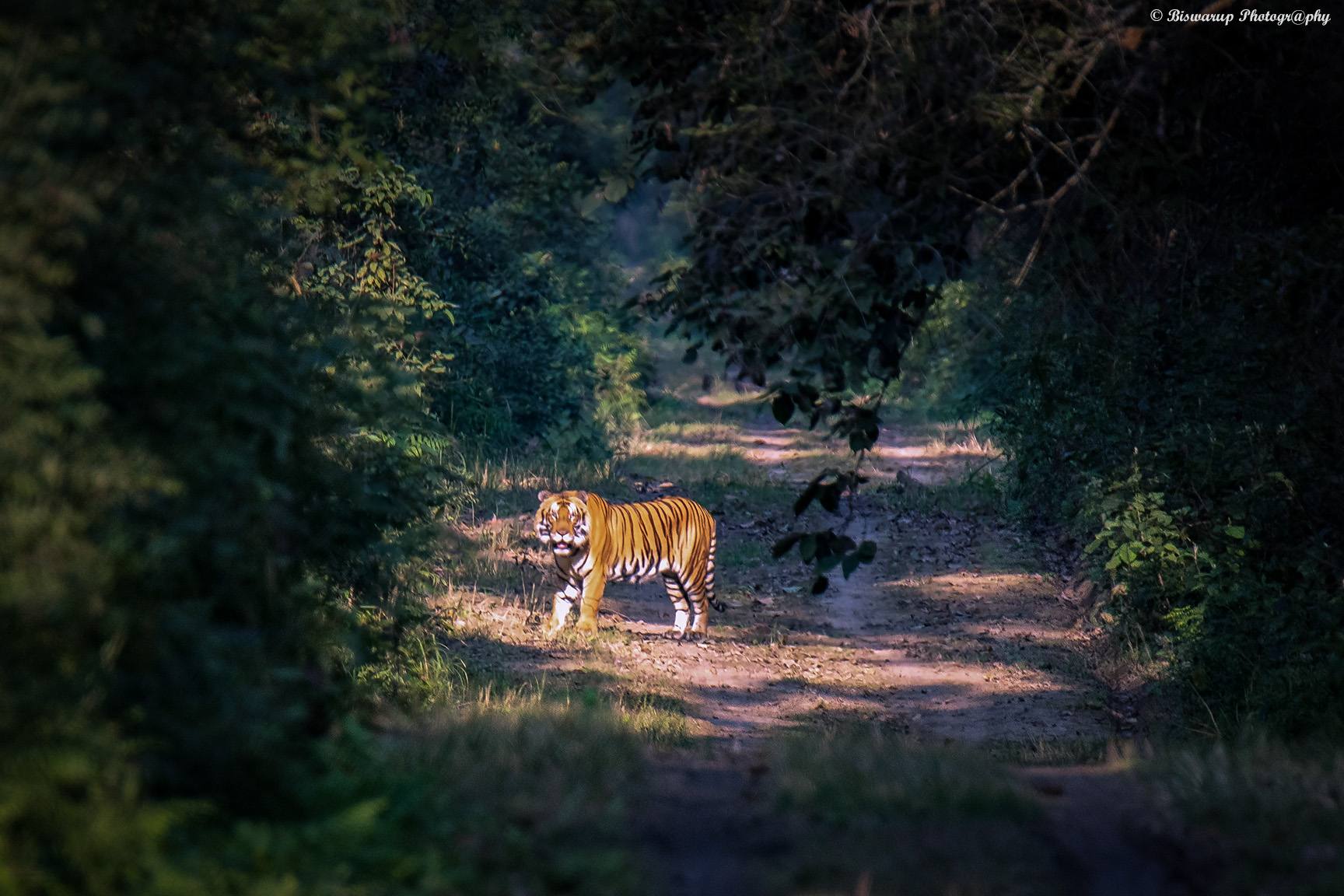
Tiger in Dudhwa National Park

In 2006, the tiger population of the Dudhwa-Kheri-Pilibhit conservation complex was estimated as comprising 80–110 tigers. Until 2010, the population had increased to an estimated 106–118 tigers and was considered stable. In July 1976, Billy Arjan Singh acquired a tiger cub named Tara from Twycross Zoo in the United Kingdom, hand reared her and later reintroduced her to the wild in the Dudhwa National Park with the permission of India's then Prime Minister Indira Gandhi.

In the 1990s, some tigers from the protected area were observed to have the typical appearance of Siberian tigers, namely a large head, pale fur, white complexion, and wide stripes, and were suspected to be Bengal-Siberian tiger hybrids. Billy Arjan Singh sent hair samples of tigers from the national park to the Centre for Cellular and Molecular Biology in Hyderabad where the samples were analysed using mitochondrial sequence analysis. Results revealed that the tigers in question had a Bengal tiger mitochondrial haplotype indicating that their mother was a Bengal tiger. Skin, hair and blood samples from 71 tigers collected in various Indian zoos, in the National Museum in Kolkata and including two samples from Dudhwa National Park were prepared for microsatellite analysis that revealed that two tigers had alleles in two loci contributed by Bengal and Siberian tiger subspecies. However, samples of two hybrid specimens constituted too small a sample base to conclusively assume that Tara was the source of the Siberian tiger genes.

=== Indian rhinoceros ===
The Indian rhinoceros population in Dudhwa Tiger Reserve has risen to 53 individuals according to the census of 2026; officials attributed the increase to sustained conservation efforts, including habitat protection and breeding support.

== Conservation challenges ==
Dudhwa National Park faces threats from poaching, illegal wildlife trade, habitat degradation, and human wildlife conflict. Its proximity to the India–Nepal border has historically made it vulnerable to cross border wildlife trafficking.
