= Dudhwa National Park =

National park in Uttar Pradesh, India

- Dudhwa Tiger Reserve
- IUCN category II (national park)
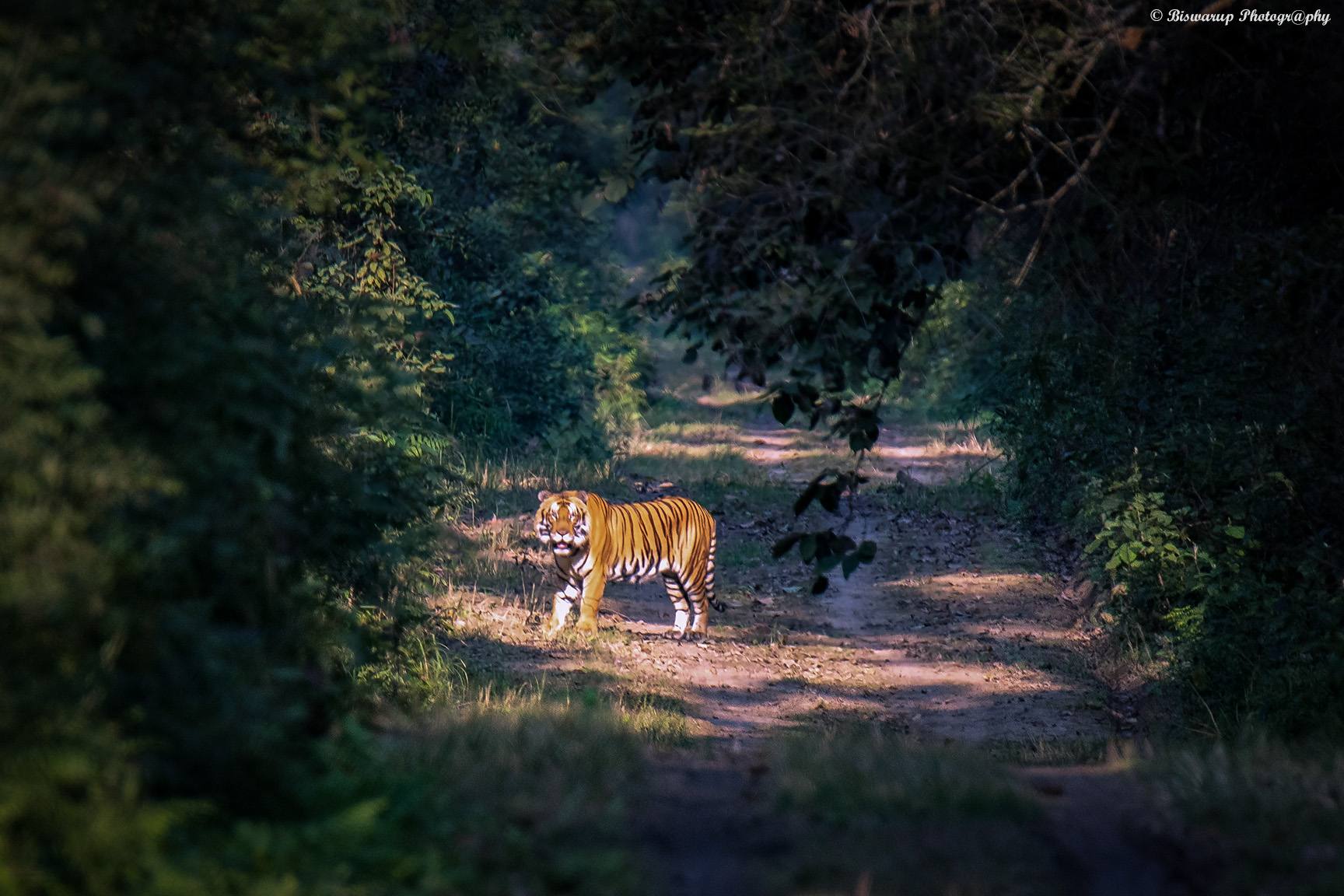
- A tiger in Dudhwa National Park

- Location within Uttar Pradesh Location within India
- Interactive map of Dudhwa National Park
- Location: Dudhwa, Lakhimpur Kheri district, Uttar Pradesh, India
- Nearest city: Lakhimpur and Palia Kalan
- Coordinates: 28°30.5′N 80°40.8′E
- Area: 614 km^{2} (237 sq mi)
- Established: 1977; 49 years ago
- Visitors: 26,000 (in 2022)
- Governing body: Uttar Pradesh State Government

Dudhwa National Park is a national park in the Terai belt of marshy grasslands in northern Uttar Pradesh, India. It stretches over an area of 490.3 km^{2} (189.3 sq mi), with a buffer zone of 190 km^{2} (73 sq mi). It is part of the Dudhwa Tiger Reserve in the Lakhimpur Kheri district.

== History ==
The area of today's Dudhwa National Park was established in 1958 as a wildlife sanctuary for swamp deer. It was notified as a national park in January 1977 thanks to the efforts of Billy Arjan Singh. In 1987, Dudhwa National Park together with Kishanpur Wildlife Sanctuary and Katarniaghat Wildlife Sanctuary was declared a tiger reserve named Dudhwa Tiger Reserve.

== Geography ==
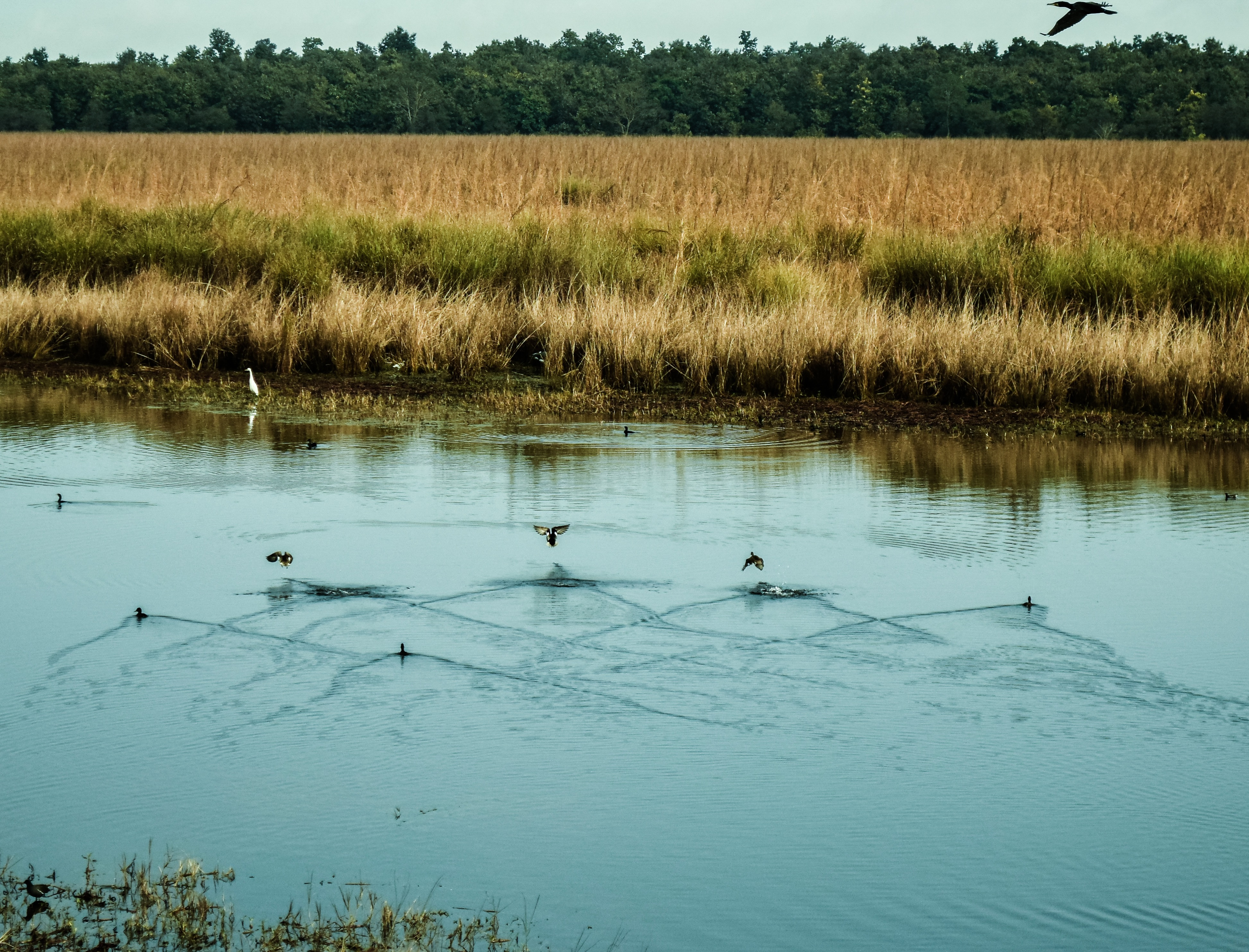
Landscape of Dhudhwa National Park

Dudhwa National Park is located in Lakhimpur Kheri district of Uttar Pradesh. The area of the park falls within the Upper Gangetic plains and is a vast alluvial plain ranging in elevation from 150 m (490 ft) in the farthest southeast to 182 m (597 ft) in the north.

=== Climate ===
Dudhwa National Park has a humid subtropical climate with dry winters. From mid-October to mid-March, temperatures hover between 20 and 30 °C (68 and 86 °F). Annual temperature vary between 6 °C (43 °F) in the winter and 45 °C (113 °F) in the summer. The prevailing winds are westerlies, although easterly winds are common during the rainy season from June to September.

== Fauna ==
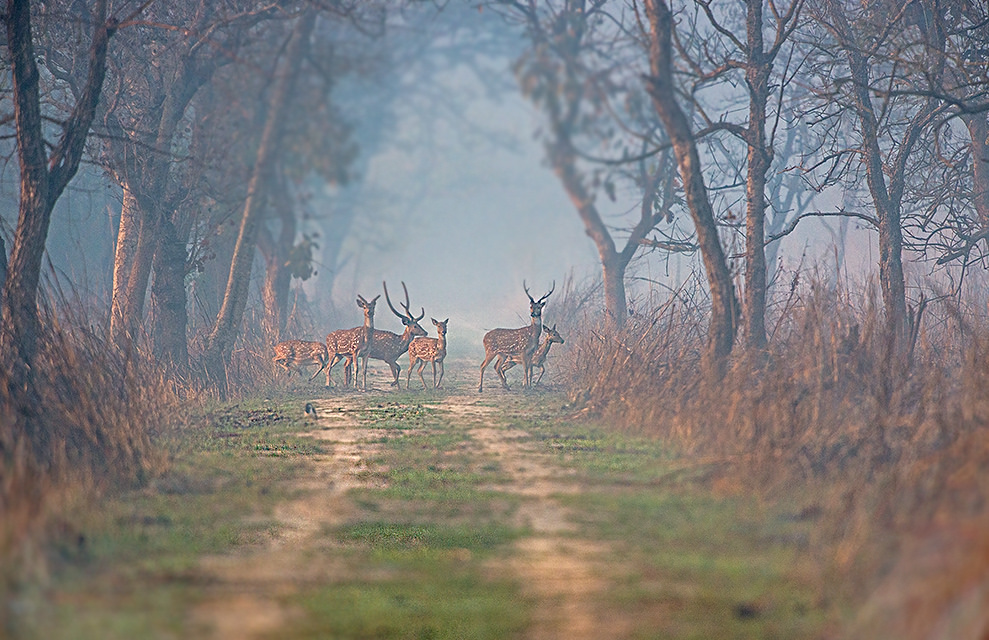
Spotted deer herd in Dudhwa

Dudhwa National Park is home to diverse wildlife species including swamp deer, sambar deer, barking deer, spotted deer, hog deer, Bengal tiger, Indian elephant, Indian rhinoceros, Indian leopard, sloth bear, honey badger, golden jackal, Viverrinae, jungle cat, fishing cat and leopard cat. Billy Arjan Singh successfully hand-reared and reintroduced zoo-born tigers and Indian leopards into the wilds of Dudhwa.

The number of barasingha increased to 6,137 in 2022 from 3,691 in 1977. Similarly, the number of chital from 22,408 to 36,636, barking deer from 1,284 to 2,560 and Indian hog deer from 3,169 to 5,351. The leopard population also grew significantly to 93 in 2025 from 34 in 2022. In 1984-85, Indian rhinoceros from Assam and Nepal was reintroduced into Dudhwa National Park. In 2024, there were 46 rhinos in the park.

Hispid hare, earlier thought to have become extinct, was rediscovered in 1984.

=== Birds ===
Dudhwa National Park is habitat of over 400 species of birds, including both resident and migratory. It includes Indian peafowl, ducks, geese, hornbills, heron, hawk, bee-eaters, minivets, kingfishers, painted storks, sarus cranes, swamp francolin, woodpeckers, barbets, minivets, bee-eaters, bulbuls, Bengal florican, Asian barbets, drongos, barbets, cormorants, teal, egrets, orioles, painted stork, fishing eagle, owls. The white-rumped vulture and red-headed vulture, both Critically Endangered vulture species have been sighted in the park.
