= Kishanpur Wildlife Sanctuary =

Wildlife sanctuary in Uttar Pradesh, India

- IUCN category IV (habitat/species management area)
- Location within Uttar Pradesh Location within India
- Interactive map of Kishanpur Wildlife Sanctuary
- Location: Mailani, Lakhimpur Kheri, Uttar Pradesh, India
- Coordinates: 28°24′01″N 80°22′01″E
- Area: 227 km^{2} (88 sq mi)
- Established: 1972

Kishanpur Wildlife Sanctuary is a wildlife sanctuary in Uttar Pradesh, India. It covers an area of 227 km^{2} (88 sq mi) and was founded in 1972. It is part of Dudhwa Tiger Reserve.

== Fauna ==
Kishanpur Wildlife Sanctuary is home to Indian elephants.

Tiger, Leopard, Swamp deer, Hog deer, Barking deer, Bengal florican, Lesser florican
