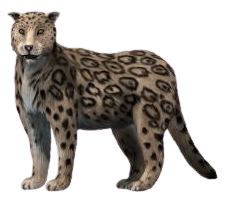
- Life restoration

Scientific classification
- Kingdom: Animalia
- Phylum: Chordata
- Class: Mammalia
- Order: Carnivora
- Family: Felidae
- Subfamily: Pantherinae
- Genus: †Palaeopanthera; Hemmer, 2023

Type species
- †Panthera blytheae Tseng et al., 2014

Species
- †P. blytheae (Tseng et al., 2014); †P. pamiri? (Ozansoy, 1965)

= Palaeopanthera =

Palaeopanthera Temporal range: Late Miocene–Early Pliocene

Extinct genus of mammal

Palaeopanthera (lit. 'ancient Panthera') is an extinct genus of pantherine felid which lived during the Late Miocene to Early Pliocene of Asia (China and Turkey). It contains two species, P. blytheae and P. pamiri, which were initially suggested as members of the genera Panthera and Felis respectively, but subsequent studies have placed both species to be separate from their original generic assignment.

== Discovery and naming ==
Known from a partial skull and isolated teeth, the fossils of P. blytheae were first excavated in August 2010 in the Zanda Basin located in the Ngari Prefecture on the Tibetan Plateau, and were subsequently described and named in 2014. The type specimen, IVPP V18788.1, is dated to the Early Pliocene, approximately 4.42 million years ago. While some material from the latest Miocene has been initially referred to this species, other researchers argued that the putative Late Miocene material is undiagnostic at genus level and that it could belong to other felids, probably the machairodontines.

First assigned to the genus Panthera, the specific name blytheae was created in honor of the daughter of Paul Haaga and Heather Haaga, who supported the Natural History Museum of Los Angeles County. A partial first upper right molar (IVPP V 19064) identified as cf. P. blytheae was discovered from the Yuzhu Peak of Kunlun Mountains. In 2023, Hemmer erected a new genus Palaeopanthera, meaning ancient Panthera, with P. blytheae as the type species.

The second species P. pamiri was first described in 1965 as a species of Felis based on remains found in the Late Miocene (Vallesian) deposits of Yassiören, Turkey. This species has a complicated taxonomic history, with subsequent studies reassigning it as a species of separate genera: Metailurus in 1978, Miopanthera in 2017 and Palaeopanthera in 2023.

== Description ==
Although only one skull of Panthera blytheae has been discovered, its describers suggested that the species has a number of features common in other Panthera species, including a "frontoparietal suture located at the postorbital constriction", and an "absence of an anterior bulge overhanging the infraorbital canal". Its size is thought to be on par with that of the clouded leopard. It is about 10% smaller than the snow leopard. However, this is purely based on the relative sizes of the cranium, so this may be slightly inaccurate.

== Classification ==
While P. blytheae was initially suggested to be related to the modern snow leopard, various researchers since 2017 have questioned the classification of the poorly preserved P. blytheae to the genus Panthera based on limited comparisons to other species including the snow leopard, and as lacking features that comply with Panthera features. In 2023, Hemmer proposed that P. blytheae and "Miopanthera" pamiri are distantly related to extant big cats and instead more closely related to Neofelis, and erected Palaeopanthera for both species. In the same year, the describers of Pachypanthera recognized Hemmer's new genus Palaeopanthera but didn't comment on its generic validity. In their supplementary material of the 2025 study, the describers of the European paleosubspecies of the modern snow leopard (P. u. lusitana) also recognized Hemmer's genus and argued that the craniodental morphology (upper third molar, jugal, postorbital and buccal grooves) of P. blytheae are clearly not present in the genus Panthera but can be observed in the genus Lynx, and thus this taxon which requires more material to clarify its taxonomic affinites is not closely related to or a member of the snow leopard lineage.

Whether P. blytheae belongs to the genus Panthera or not, this species is not thought to be as closely related to the other extant species of Panthera since its initial description, and is therefore not believed to be the common ancestor of all pantherines. This implies that the divergence of Panthera from the rest of Felidae was much earlier, with current estimates being approximately 16.4 million years ago. Analysis of the location of P. blytheae in relation to other Panthera species indicates that Panthera arose in Central/Northern Asia or the Holarctic region of Asia, with other pantherines migrating to Europe, Africa and the Americas.

== See also ==
- Panthera atrox
- Panthera gombaszogensis
- Panthera palaeosinensis
- Panthera shawi
- Panthera spelaea
- Panthera youngi
- Panthera zdanskyi
