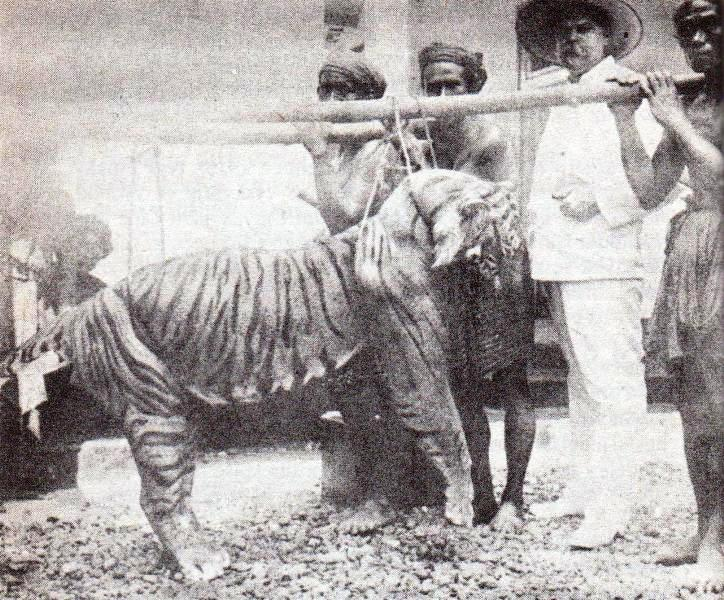
- A Bali tiger killed by M. Zanveld in the 1920s

Conservation status
- Extinct (1950s) (IUCN 3.1)

Scientific classification
- Kingdom: Animalia
- Phylum: Chordata
- Class: Mammalia
- Order: Carnivora
- Family: Felidae
- Genus: Panthera
- Species: P. tigris
- Subspecies: P. t. sondaica
- Population: †Bali tiger
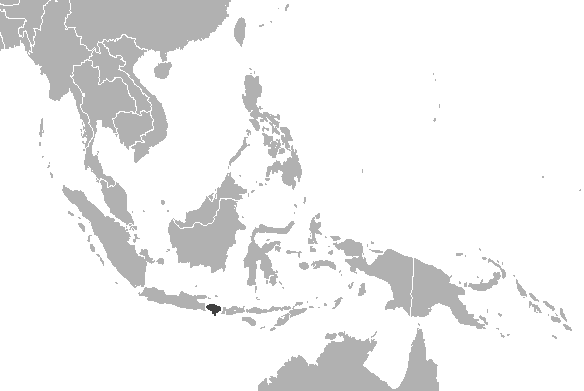
- Historical range of Bali tiger

= Bali tiger =

Extinct tiger population in Sunda Island Bali

The Bali tiger was a Panthera tigris sondaica population on the Indonesian island of Bali which has been extinct since the 1950s. It was formerly regarded as a distinct tiger subspecies with the scientific name Panthera tigris balica, which had been assessed as extinct on the IUCN Red List in 2008. In 2017, felid taxonomy was revised, and it was subordinated to P. t. sondaica, which also includes the still surviving Sumatran tiger.

Results of a mitochondrial DNA analysis of 23 tiger samples from museum collections indicate that tigers colonized the Sunda Islands during the last glacial period 11,000–12,000 years ago.

In Bali, the last tigers were recorded in the late 1930s. A few individuals likely survived into the 1940s and possibly 1950s. The population was hunted to extirpation and its natural habitat converted for human use.

Balinese names for the tiger are harimau Bali and samong.

== Taxonomic history ==
In 1912, the German zoologist Ernst Schwarz described a skin and the skull of an adult female tiger in the Senckenberg Museum collection, that had originated in Bali. He named it Felis tigris balica and argued that it is distinct from the Javan tiger by its brighter fur colour and smaller skull with narrower zygomatic arches. In 1969, the distinctiveness of the Bali tiger was questioned, since morphological analysis of several tiger skulls from Bali revealed that size variation is similar to Javan tiger skulls. The hue and striping pattern of fur neither differ significantly. A comparison of mitochondrial DNA sequences from 23 museum specimens of Bali and Javan tigers with other living tiger subspecies revealed a close genetic resemblance of the tigers in the Sunda Islands. They form a monophyletic group distinct and equidistant from tigers in mainland Asia.

In 2017, the Cat Classification Task Force of the Cat Specialist Group revised felid taxonomy, and now recognizes the extinct Bali and Javan tiger populations, as well as the Sumatran tiger population as P. t. sondaica.

== Characteristics ==
The Bali tiger was described as the smallest tiger in the Sunda islands. Skins of males measured between the pegs are 220 to 230 cm (87 to 91 in) long from head to end of tail; those of females 190 to 210 cm (75 to 83 in). The weight of males ranged from 90 to 100 kg (200 to 220 lb), and of females from 65 to 80 kg (143 to 176 lb).

In the 20th century, only seven skins and skulls of tigers from Bali were known to be preserved in museum collections. The common feature of these skulls is the narrow occipital plane, which is analogous with the shape of tiger skulls from Java. Skulls of male and female tigers measure 296 ± 1.5 mm (11.654 ± 0.059 in) and 262 ± 2.0 mm (10.315 ± 0.079 in), respectively.

== Habitat and ecology ==
Most of the known Bali tiger zoological specimens originated in western Bali, where mangrove forests, dunes and savanna vegetation existed. The main prey of the Bali tiger was likely the Javan rusa (Rusa timorensis).

== Extinction ==
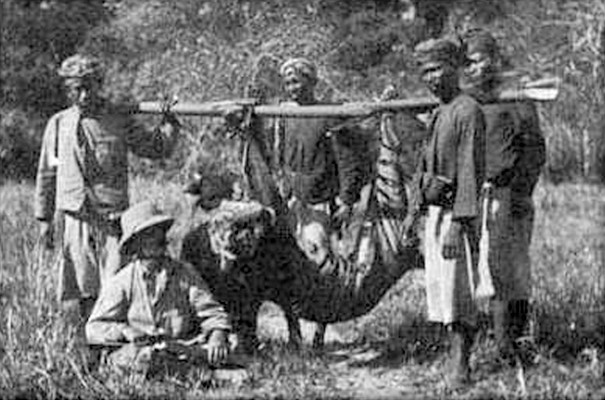
A hunting party with a tiger shot in northwestern Bali, November 1911

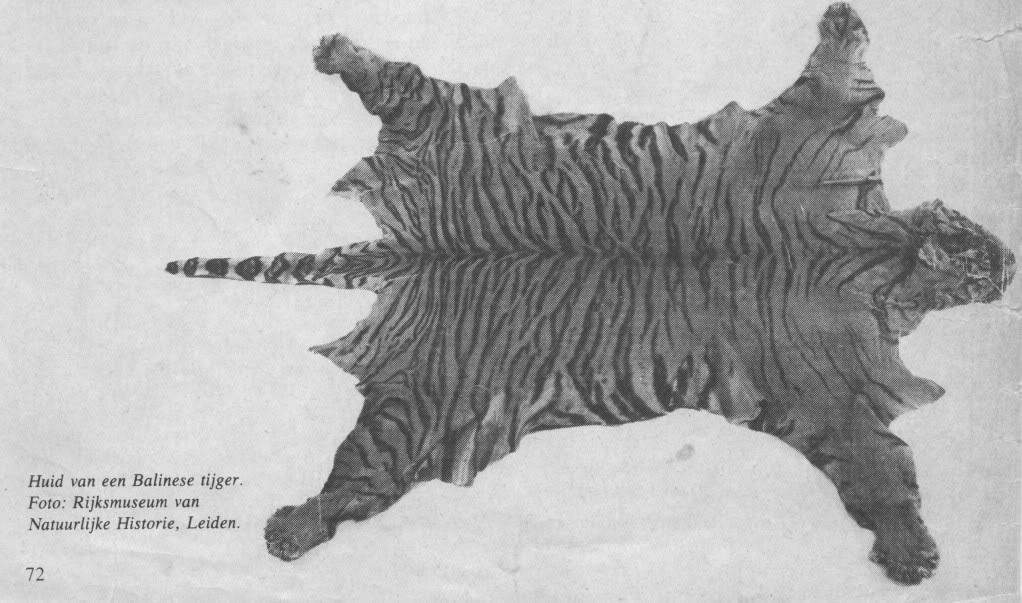
A preserved skin of Bali tiger

At the end of the 19th century, palm plantations and irrigated rice fields were established foremost on Bali's rich volcanic northern slopes and the alluvial strip around the island. Tiger hunting started after the Dutch gained control over Bali.

During the Dutch colonial period, hunting trips were conducted by European sportsmen coming from Java, who had a romantic but disastrous Victorian hunting mentality and were equipped with high-powered rifles. The preferred method of hunting tigers was to catch them with a large, heavy steel foot trap hidden under bait, a goat or a muntjac, and then shoot them at close range. A Surabayan gunmaker is confirmed to have killed over 20 tigers in only a few years.

In 1941, the first game reserve, today's West Bali National Park, was established in western Bali, but too late to save Bali's tiger population from extinction. It was probably eliminated by the end of World War II. A few tigers may have survived until the 1950s, but no specimen reached museum collections after the war.

A few tiger skulls, skins and bones are preserved in museums. The British Museum in London has the largest collection, with two skins and three skulls; others include the Senckenberg Museum in Frankfurt, the State Museum of Natural History Stuttgart, the Naturalis museum in Leiden and the Zoological Museum of Bogor, Indonesia, which owns the remnants of the last known Bali tiger. In 1997, a skull emerged in the old collection of the Hungarian Natural History Museum and was scientifically studied and properly documented.

== Cultural significance ==
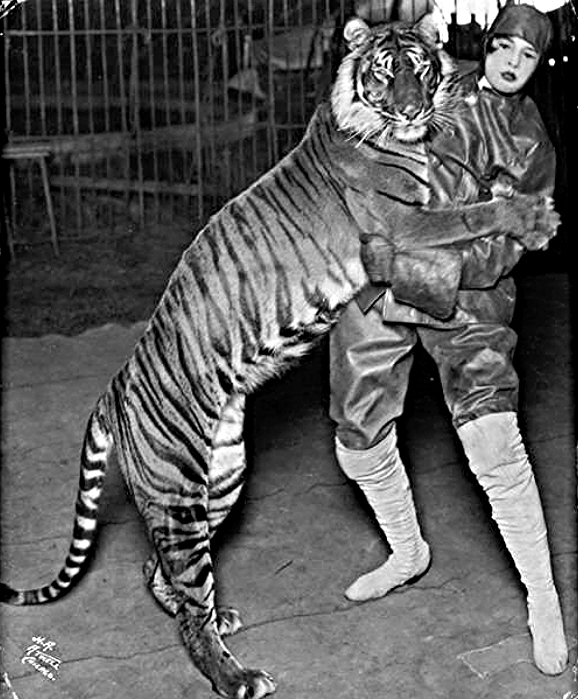
Bali tiger with its tamer Rose Flanders Bascom, ca. 1915

The tiger had a well-defined position in Balinese folkloric beliefs and magic. It is mentioned in folk tales and depicted in traditional arts, as in the Kamasan paintings of the Klungkung kingdom. The Balinese considered the ground powder of tiger whiskers to be a potent and undetectable poison for one's foe. A Balinese baby was given a protective amulet necklace with black coral and "a tiger's tooth or a piece of tiger bone".

The traditional Balinese Barong dance preserves a figure with the mask of a tiger called Barong Macan.

== See also ==
- Mainland Asian tiger populations:
  - Bengal tiger
  - Caspian tiger
  - Indochinese tiger
  - Malayan tiger
  - Siberian tiger
  - South China tiger
- Sunda Island tiger populations:
  - Sumatran tiger
  - Javan tiger
  - Bornean tiger
  - Prehistoric tigers: Panthera tigris soloensis
  - Panthera tigris trinilensis
  - Panthera tigris acutidens
- Holocene extinction
