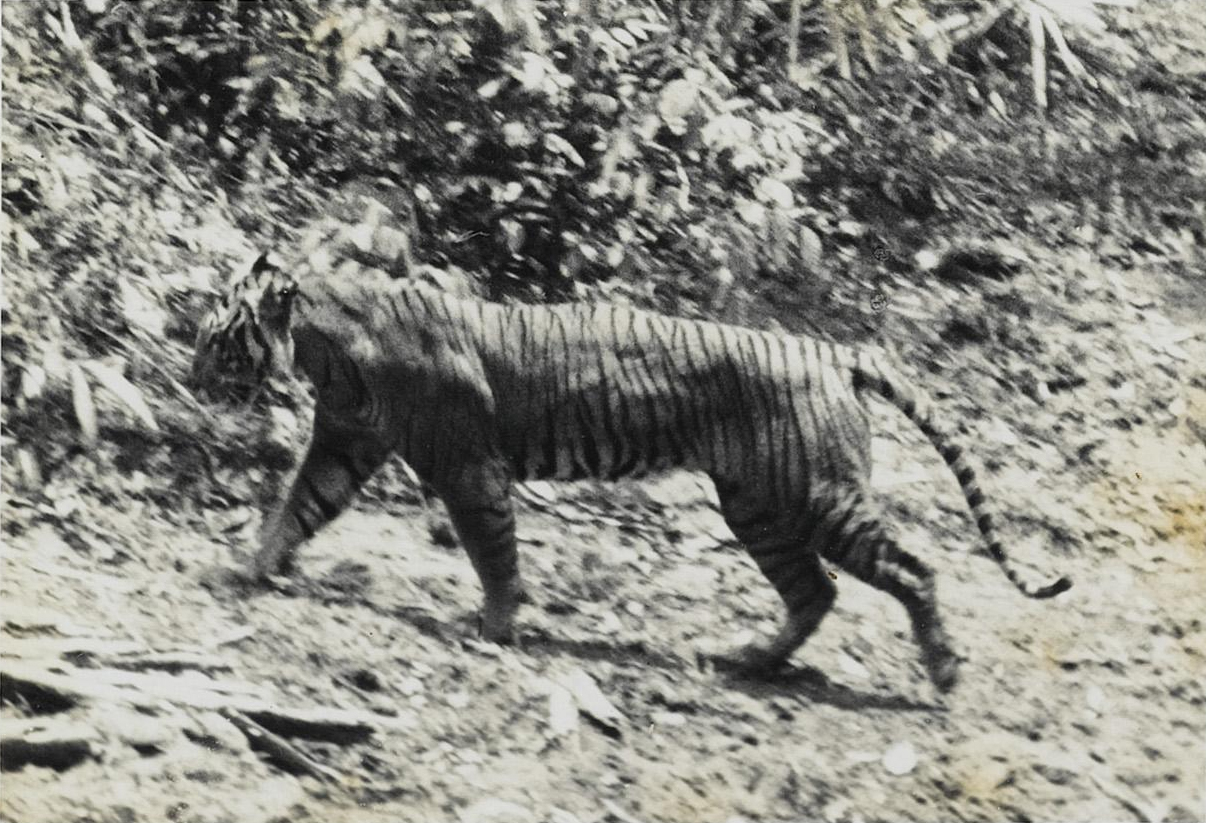
- A photo of a Javan tiger, 1938 at Ujung Kulon

Conservation status
- Extinct (2008) (IUCN 3.1)

Scientific classification
- Kingdom: Animalia
- Phylum: Chordata
- Class: Mammalia
- Order: Carnivora
- Family: Felidae
- Genus: Panthera
- Species: P. tigris
- Subspecies: P. t. sondaica
- Population: †Javan tiger

= Javan tiger =

Extinct tiger population in Sunda Island Java

The Javan tiger was a Panthera tigris sondaica population native to the Indonesian island of Java. It was one of the three tiger populations that lived in the Sunda Islands during the last glacial period 110,000–12,000 years ago. It used to inhabit most of Java, but its natural habitat decreased continuously due to conversion for agricultural land use and infrastructure. By 1940, it had retreated to remote montane and forested areas. Since no evidence of a Javan tiger was found during several studies in the 1980s and 1990s, it was assessed as being extinct in 2008.

== Taxonomy ==
Felis tigris sondaicus was proposed by Coenraad Jacob Temminck in 1844 as a scientific name for the Javan tiger.

In 1929, the British taxonomist Reginald Innes Pocock subordinated the tiger under the genus Panthera using the scientific name Panthera tigris.

In 2017, the Cat Classification Task Force of the Cat Specialist Group revised felid taxonomy and now recognizes the Javan tiger together with the Sumatran tiger and the Bali tigers as one subspecies, P. t. sondaica.

=== Evolution ===
Results of mitochondrial DNA analysis of 23 tiger samples from museum collections indicate that the tiger colonized the Sunda Islands during the last glacial period 110,000–12,000 years ago.

== Characteristics ==
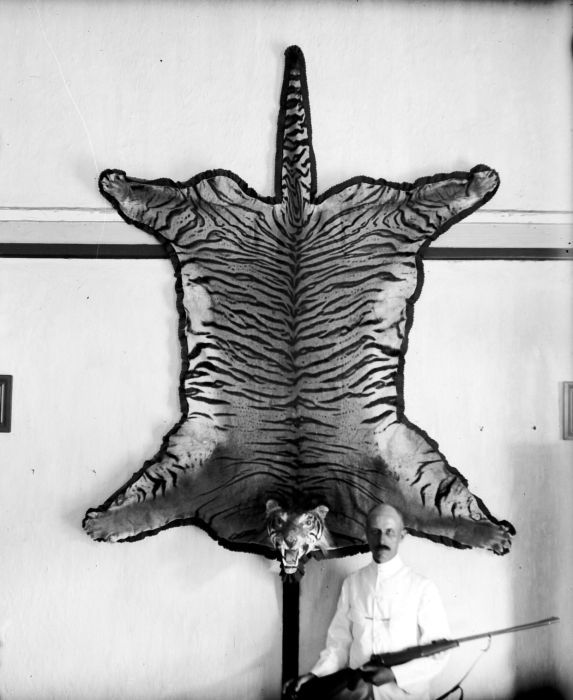
Skin of a Javan tiger in the collection of the Tropenmuseum, 1915

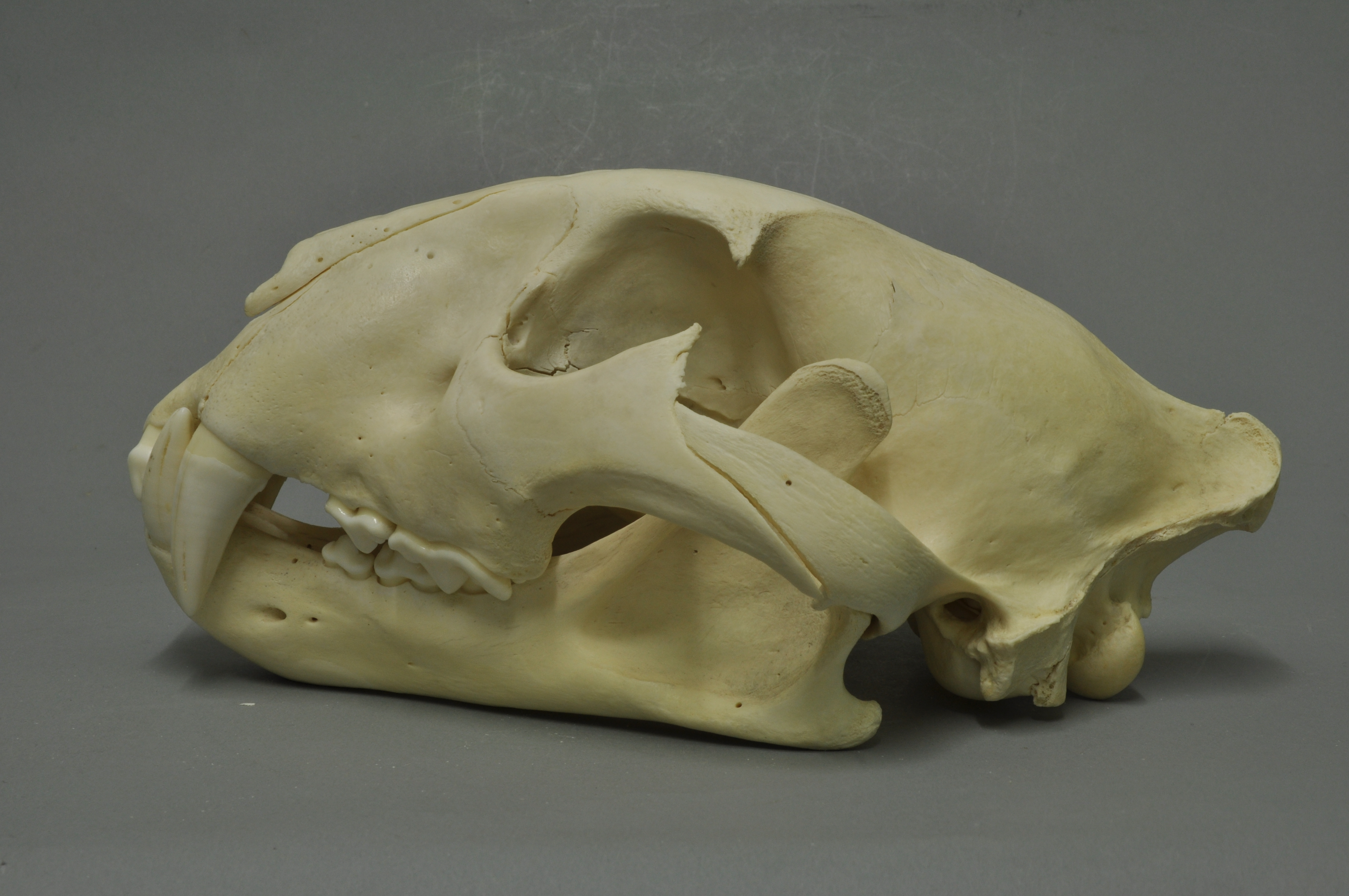
Tiger skull from Java in the collection of the Museum Wiesbaden

The Javan tiger was small compared to other subspecies of the Asian mainland, but larger than the Bali tiger, and similar in size to the Sumatran tiger. It usually had long and thin stripes, which were slightly more numerous than those of the Sumatran tiger. Its nose was long and narrow, the occipital plane remarkably narrow, and carnassials were relatively long. Based on these cranial differences, the Javan tiger was proposed to be assigned to a distinct species, with the taxonomic name Panthera sondaica. Male Javan tiger skulls are 326.3 ± 2.14 mm (12.846 ± 0.084 in) long, and those of females 282.7 ± 1.87 mm (11.130 ± 0.074 in).

Males had a mean body length of 248 cm (98 in) and weighed between 100 and 141 kg (220 and 311 lb). Females were smaller than males and weighed between 75 and 115 kg (165 and 254 lb). The smaller body size of the Javan tiger is attributed to Bergmann's rule and the size of the available prey species in Java, which are smaller than the deer and bovid species on the Asian mainland. However, the diameter of its tracks is larger than that of the Bengal tiger.

The Javan tiger was said to be strong enough to break the legs of horses or water buffaloes with its paws.

== Habitat and ecology ==
The Javan tiger used to inhabit most of Java but had retreated to remote montane and forested areas by 1940. Around 1970, the only known tigers lived in the region of Meru Betiri National Park. This rugged region with sloping terrain had not been settled. An area of 500 km^{2} (190 sq mi) was gazetted as a wildlife reserve in 1972. The last tigers were sighted there in 1976.

The Javan tiger preyed on wild boars, Javan warty pigs, Java mouse-deer, southern red muntjacs, Javan rusa, and bantengs. Nothing is known about its gestation period or life span in the wild or captivity. Up to World War II, some Javan tigers were kept in a few Indonesian zoos that were closed during the war. After the war, it was easier to obtain Sumatran tigers.

== Extirpation ==
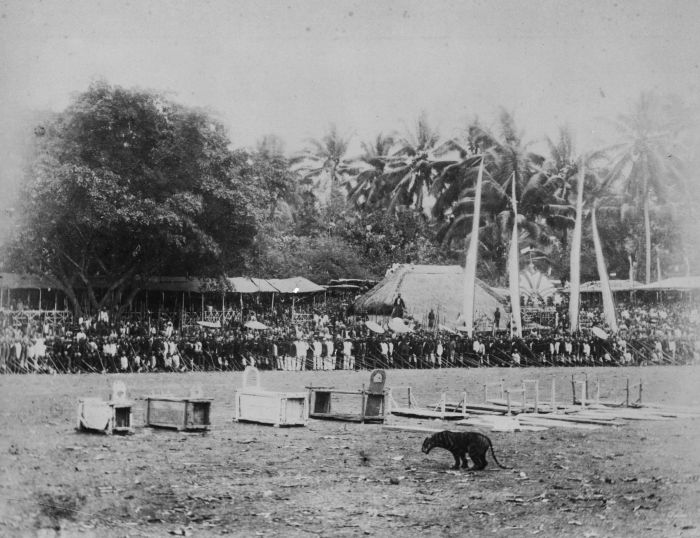
A tiger fight in Java, 1870–1892

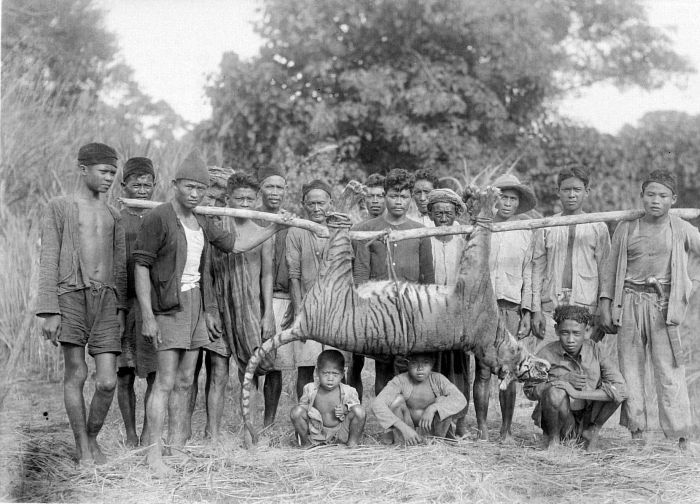
A group of men and children poses with a killed tiger in Malingping in Banten, West Java, 1941

Bounties for hunting the Javan tiger were issued in the 1830s. Around 1850, people living in rural areas considered it a plague. The killing of tigers increased at the beginning of the 20th century when 28 million people lived in Java and the production of rice was insufficient to adequately supply the growing human population. Within 15 years, 150% more land was cleared for rice fields. In 1938, natural forest covered 23% of the island. By 1975, only 8% of the forest remained, and the human population had increased to 85 million people. In this human-dominated landscape, the extirpation of the Javan tiger was intensified by the conjunction of several circumstances and events:

- Tigers and their prey were poisoned in many places during the period when their habitat was rapidly being reduced.
- Natural forests were increasingly fragmented after World War II for plantations of teak (Tectona grandis), coffee, and rubber (Hevea brasiliensis), which were unsuitable habitats for wildlife.
- The Javan rusa, the tiger's most important prey species, was lost to disease in several reserves and forests during the 1960s.
- During the period of civil unrest after 1965, armed groups retreated to reserves, where they killed the remaining tigers.

=== Last efforts ===
In 1960, the tiger population in Ujung Kulon National Park was estimated to comprise 10–12 individuals. Until the mid-1960s, tigers survived in three protected areas that had been established during the 1920s to 1930s: Leuweng Sancang Nature Reserve, Ujung Kulon, and Baluran National Parks. Following the period of civil unrest, no tigers were sighted there. In 1971, an older female was shot in a plantation near Mount Betiri in Java's southeast. The area was upgraded to a wildlife reserve in 1972, a small guard force was established, and four habitat management projects were initiated. The reserve was severely disrupted by two large plantations in the major river valleys, occupying the most suitable habitat for the tiger and its prey. In 1976, tracks were found in the eastern part of the reserve, indicating the presence of three to five tigers. Only a few bantengs survived close to the plantations, but tracks of Javan rusa were not sighted.

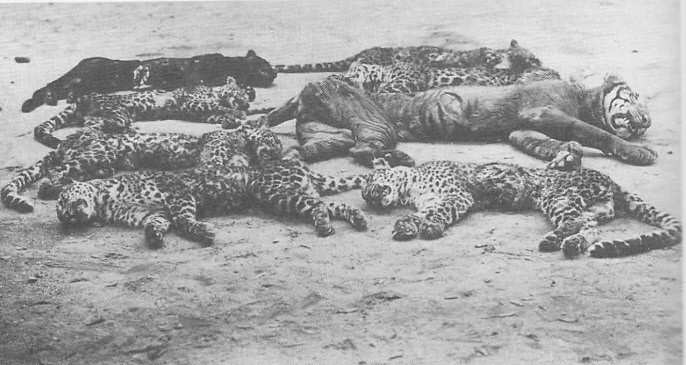
A tiger killed along with seven Javan leopards during Rampokan in Kediri, East Java, circa 1900

After 1979, no more sightings of tigers in Meru Betiri National Park were confirmed. In 1980, it was recommended to extend the wildlife reserve and eliminate the disruptive influence of humans on the fragile ecosystem. The Indonesian Nature Conservation Authority implemented these recommendations in 1982 by gazetting the reserve as a national park. These measures were too late to save the few remaining tigers in the region. In 1987, a group of 30 students of Bogor Agricultural University (Institut Pertanian Bogor) conducted an expedition to Meru Betiri. They searched the area in groups of five and found tiger scat and tracks.

In the west of Java lies the Halimun Reserve, today integrated into the Mount Halimun Salak National Park. A tiger was killed there in 1984, and pugmarks found in 1989 were the size of a tiger's. However, an expedition of six biologists conducted in 1990 did not yield any definite, direct evidence for the presence of a tiger. A subsequent survey was planned in Meru Betiri National Park in the autumn 1992 with the support of WWF Indonesia, deploying camera traps for the first time. From March 1993 to March 1994, cameras were deployed at 19 locations but did not yield a picture of a tiger. During this period, no tracks indicating the presence of tigers were discovered. After the final report of this survey had been published, the Javan tiger was declared extinct.

Rumors and indications of the possible presence of tigers in Meru Betiri National Park prompted the park's Chief Warden Indra Arinal to initiate another search. With support of the Sumatran Tiger Project, 12 park staff members were trained in autumn 1999 to set up camera traps and map their observations. The Canadian The Tiger Foundation provided infrared cameras. Despite a year of work, they did not photograph a tiger, but few prey and many poachers.

In 2008, the Javan tiger was assessed as being extinct.

== Alleged sightings ==
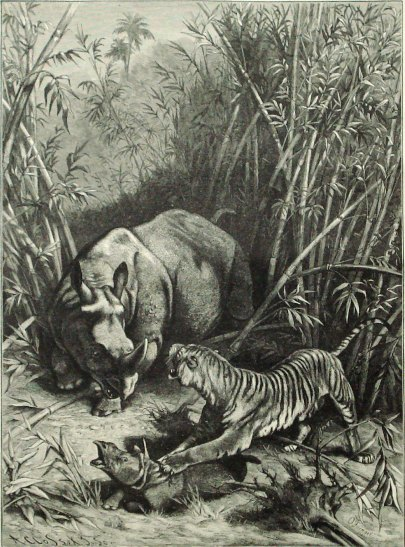
Drawing by artist O. Fienzel, 1892

Occasional, unofficial reports of Javan tigers surface from enthusiasts who believe the tiger still exists in Java. In November 2008, an unidentified body of a female mountain hiker was found in Mount Merbabu National Park in Central Java, who allegedly died from a tiger attack. Villagers who discovered the body also claimed some tiger sightings in the vicinity. In January 2009, some villagers claimed to have seen a tigress with two cubs wandering near a village adjacent to Lawu Mountain. Local authorities found several fresh tracks in the location. However, by that time, those animals had already vanished. Following the October 2010 eruption of Mount Merapi, two Indonesian villagers claimed sightings of a big cat paw print in the residual ash, which sparked rumors that a tiger or leopard was roaming abandoned farms in search of food. Personnel of the nearby national park did not think it was likely that the paw print belonged to a tiger. In 2016, a Javan tiger was allegedly photographed in Mount Arjuno in East Java. However, it was later proven to be a hoax, and the photo was actually of a Bengal tiger taken at Taman Safari Prigen, a zoo located on the slope of Mount Arjuno. In August 2017, a wildlife ranger photographed an alleged Javan tiger in Ujung Kulon National Park. A tiger expert later identified the animal as a Javan leopard.

A reported sighting of a Javan tiger in 2019 near Cipendeuy village in the south of Sukabumi Regency reignited the debate over its possible survival. A single hair found on a fence near the sighting location was thought to belong to the same group as zoological specimens of the Javan tiger by genetic analysis in 2024. This claim was shown to be faulty in a subsequent analysis.

== Cultural significance ==
In 1890, Dutch author Jan Gerhard ten Bokkel noted how the fear of tigers brought the people to use superstitious language: "A Javan will never speak about a tiger without calling him 'Mister', it's always: Mr. Tiger. The beast might hear him once, and take revenge at him for merely saying tiger in a familiar way!"

== See also ==
- Tiger populations
  - Mainland Asian populations
    - Bengal tiger
    - Caspian tiger
    - Indochinese tiger
    - Malayan tiger
    - Siberian tiger
    - South China tiger
  - Sunda island populations
    - Bali tiger
    - Bornean tiger
    - Sumatran tiger
  - Prehistoric tigers: Panthera tigris soloensis
  - Panthera tigris trinilensis
  - Panthera tigris acutidens
- Holocene extinction
