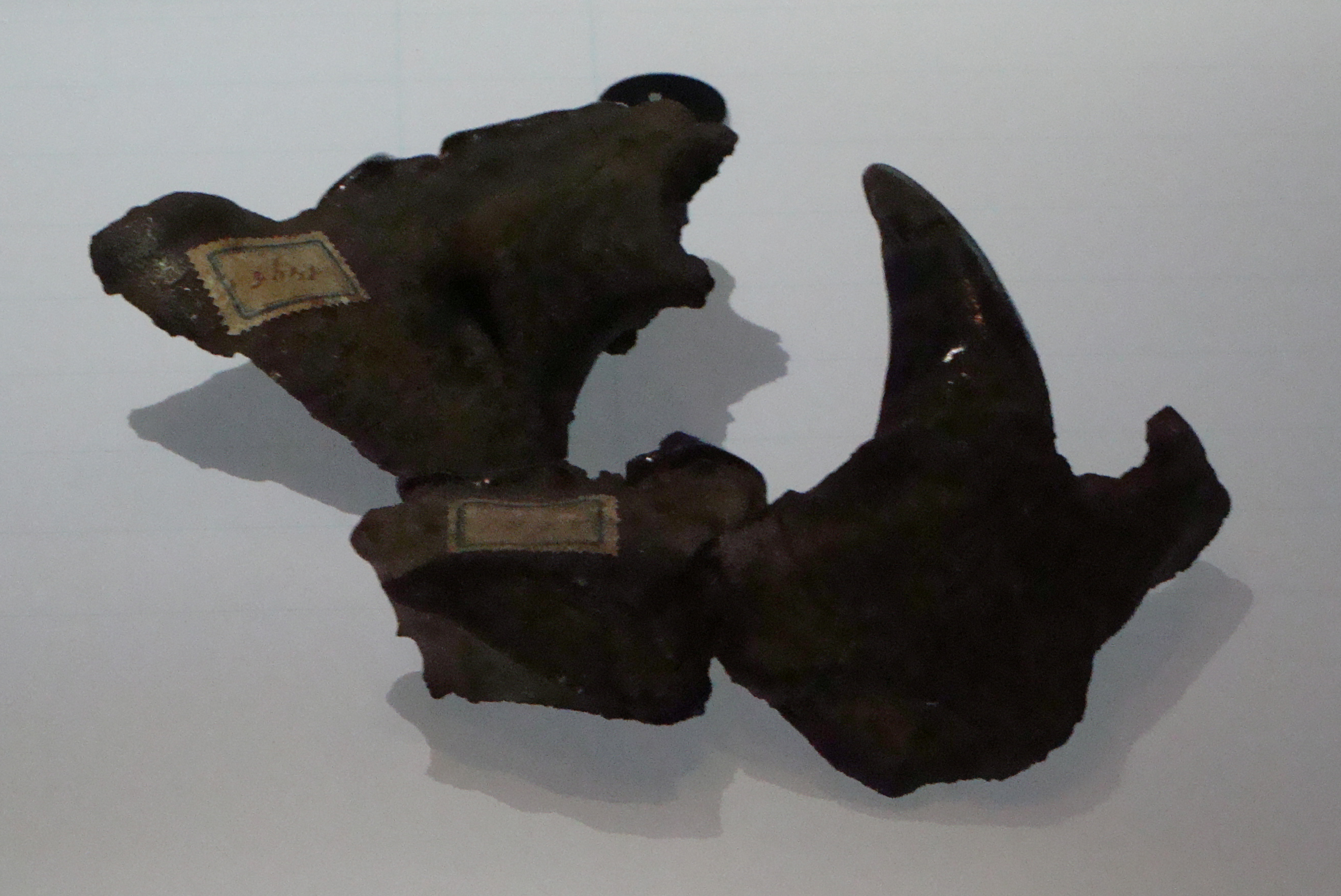
- A fossil found, thought to be of a Trinil tiger

Scientific classification
- Kingdom: Animalia
- Phylum: Chordata
- Class: Mammalia
- Order: Carnivora
- Family: Felidae
- Genus: Panthera
- Species: P. tigris
- Subspecies: †P. t. trinilensis

Trinomial name
- †Panthera tigris trinilensis Dubois, 1908

= Panthera tigris trinilensis =

Panthera tigris trinilensis Temporal range: Pleistocene

Extinct subspecies of carnivore

Panthera tigris trinilensis, known as the Trinil tiger, is an extinct tiger subspecies dating from about 1.2 million years ago that was found at the locality of Trinil, Java, Indonesia. The fossil remains are now stored in the Dubois Collection of the National Museum of Natural History in Leiden, the Netherlands. Although these fossils have been found on Java, the Trinil tiger is probably not a direct ancestor of the Javan tiger. The fossils are also evidence that these tigers had large bodies. Their competitor's may have preyed on same individuals which resulted in limiting resources and food competition leading to extinction. The Trinil tiger probably became extinct 50,000 years ago. The Bali tiger was also not closely related to the Trinil because of their time differences.

It lived in Indonesia, particularly in Java and Trinil, and according to some zoologists, it could be the ancestor of all known Indonesian subspecies. Perhaps, East Asia was a center of the origin of Pantherinae. The oldest tiger fossils found in Early Pleistocene Java show that about two million years ago, tigers were already quite common in East Asia. However, the glacial and interglacial climatic variations and other geological events may have caused repeated geographic changes in the area.

== Taxonomy ==
Much research has been done but there is not much knowledge about this subspecies. Scientists have discovered a fossil that is believed to belong to the Trinil tiger. However, there were doubts that the fossil could belong to the Trinil tiger because it was too big to belong to it. But now it is thought that it might have been a bit smaller than the Bengal tigers and similar to the Indochinese tiger's size. Food competition among large carnivores is a major incentive to increase body weight, so that this Pleistocene subspecies's weight was slightly less than today's Bengal tigers and weighed about 110–150 kg (240–330 lb).

== See also ==
- Bornean tiger
- Panthera tigris acutidens
- Panthera tigris soloensis
- Panthera zdanskyi
