= Bornean tiger =

Scientific classification
- Kingdom: Animalia
- Phylum: Chordata
- Class: Mammalia
- Order: Carnivora
- Family: Felidae
- Genus: Panthera
- Species: P. tigris
- Population: Bornean tiger

Tiger population from the Greater Sunda island of Borneo

The Bornean tiger or Borneo tiger is possibly an extinct tiger population that lived on the island of Borneo in prehistoric times.

Two partial bone fragments suggest that the tiger was certainly present in Borneo during the Late Pleistocene. A live Bornean tiger has not been conclusively recorded.

== History ==
=== Fossil records ===
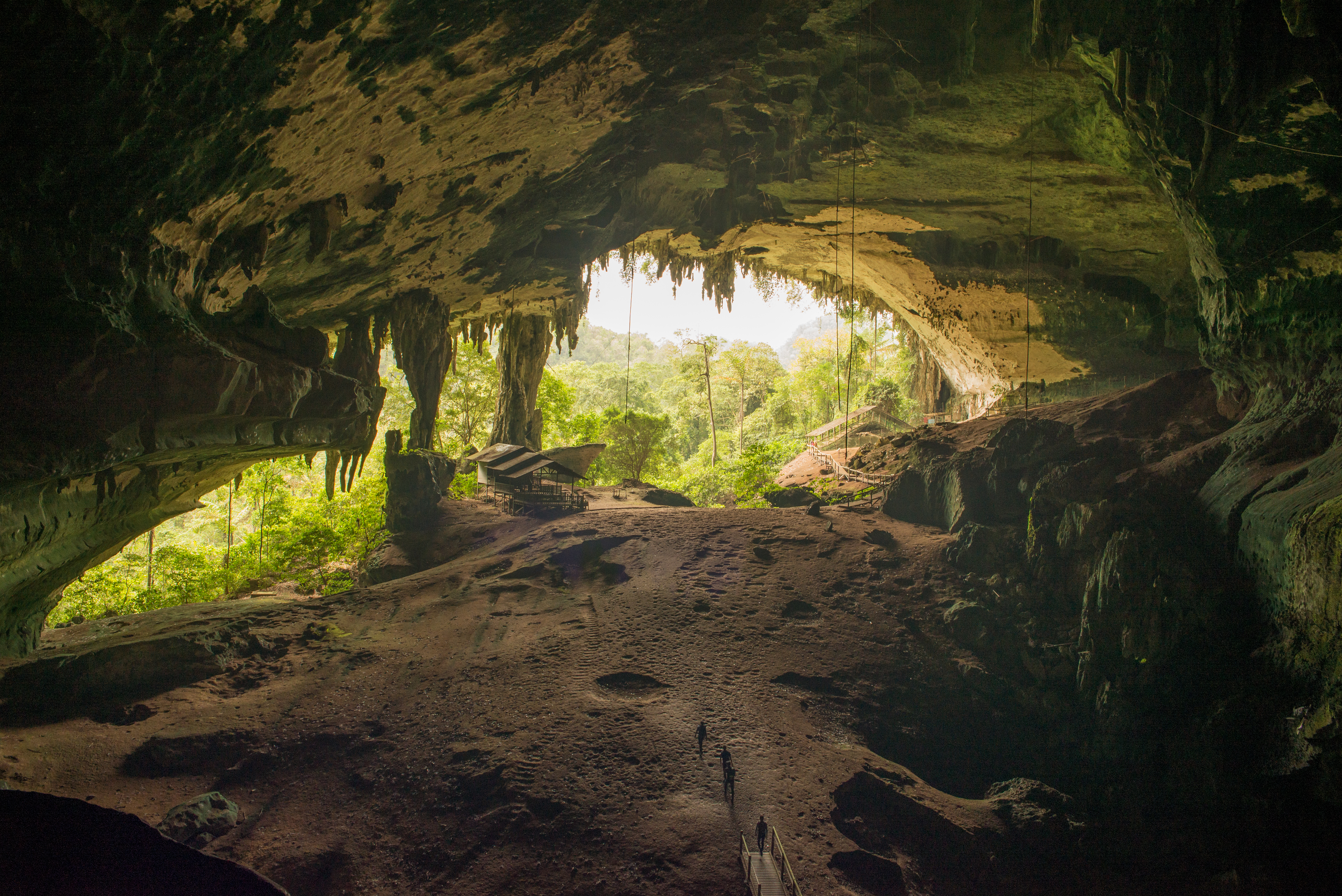
Entrance of the Great Cave of Niah in Sarawak, Malaysian Borneo

As of 2021, only two specimens are confirmed as definitive Late Pleistocene fossil records of Bornean tigers. The first specimen, reported in 2007, is a metacarpal bone fragment of a young tiger dated to approximately 13,000 years ago. The second specimen, reported in 2021, is a partial mandible of a large tiger dated to approximately 22,000 years ago. Archaeological excavations also produced an upper canine tooth and a navicular of a tiger, with the latter dated between 10,500 and 3,000 years BP, and thus the tiger was likely present in Borneo during the late Pleistocene and Holocene.

=== Connection with other Southeast Asian fossils ===
A bone fragment was also found in the Philippine island of Palawan, though archaeologists considered it unlikely that these fragments were traded between different regions during the Pleistocene. Two fossil bone fragments excavated at the Ille Cave on the island of Palawan in the Philippines were identified as being of a tiger. One fragment is a full basal phalanx bone of the second digit of the left manus measuring 46.44 mm (1.828 in); the other is the distal portion of a subterminal phalanx of the same digit and manus measuring 16.04 mm (0.631 in). These lengths are similar to those of living tigers from the Malay Peninsula and India.

Borneo might have been connected to Palawan during the penultimate and previous glacial periods, judging from the molecular phylogeny of murids in the area. Tiger parts were commonly used as amulets in South and Southeast Asia, so it is possible that the tiger parts found in Palawan were imported from elsewhere.

It is also possible that the tiger crossed the Balabac Strait in the Middle Pleistocene, about 420,000–620,000 years ago, when the distance between Borneo and Palawan was shorter, and the sea level was lower, than today. During this period, the relative sea level decreased to about −130 m (−430 ft) due to the expansion of ice sheets. To date, no evidence exists for the tiger surviving in Palawan beyond 12,000 years ago.

=== Alleged records and conjecture ===
In 1975, Douchan Gersi claimed to have seen a tiger in East Kalimantan, Indonesia. He took two photographs of the animal. These photos depict a tiger, but the authenticity of the photographs was doubted, and its origin remains unclear. It might have been an escaped captive animal. In 1995, native people in Central Kalimantan claimed to have heard a tiger roar, and that they were able to distinguish between a tiger's roar and vocalisations of other animals.

The Bornean tiger is considered to have been rather small in size. The native people suggest that it is bigger than a Bornean clouded leopard, as big as the Sumatran tiger, and largely brown in colour with faint stripes. The tiger is thought to have preyed on ungulate species such as the Bornean bearded pig, the Bornean yellow muntjac and the sambar deer. According to the local Dayak, the tiger did not climb trees.

== In culture ==
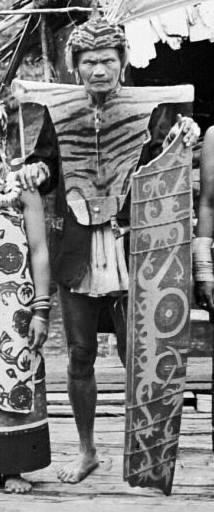
A Dayak man in Kalimantan in traditional attire

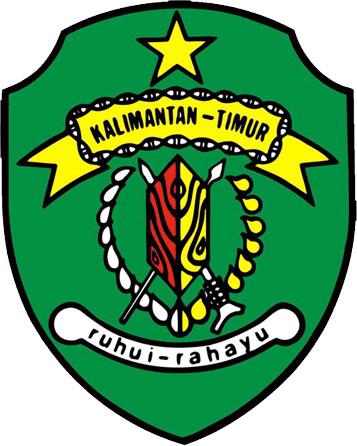
Coat of arms of East Kalimantan, featuring tiger stripes

Natives of Borneo keep the memory of the tiger alive in their culture by treating its body parts as heirlooms; therefore, it has been suggested that the Bornean tiger survived longer than prehistoric times. Tiger claws were used as protective amulets among the Kenyah, Ngaju and Iban peoples, possibly for important ceremonies or to be worn by individuals of prominent status; vocabulary referring to the animal's presence (but also in avoidance speech) is also attested, such as aso for 'dog' or buang / bohang for 'bear', as a replacement in Kayanic languages. Tiger motifs are also seen depicted in traditional, ceremonial and modern carvings; additionally, tigers can be seen on weaved fabrics, such as mats and clothing, like the Iban pua kumbu.

== See also ==
- Sunda Islands
- Tiger populations
  - Mainland Asian populations
    - Bengal tiger
    - Caspian tiger
    - Indochinese tiger
    - Malayan tiger
    - Siberian tiger
    - South China tiger
  - Sunda island populations
    - Bali tiger
    - Javan tiger
    - Sumatran tiger
  - Prehistoric tigers: Panthera tigris soloensis
  - Panthera tigris trinilensis
  - Panthera tigris acutidens
