= Panthera principialis =

Panthera principialis Temporal range: Pliocene ~3.7 Ma

Scientific classification
- Kingdom: Animalia
- Phylum: Chordata
- Class: Mammalia
- Order: Carnivora
- Family: Felidae
- Subfamily: Pantherinae
- Genus: Panthera
- Species: †P. principialis

Binomial name
- †Panthera principialis Hemmer, 2023

Extinct species of carnivore

Panthera principialis is an extinct species in the big cat genus Panthera that was described in 2023 based on fragmentary Pliocene-aged fossils from Laetoli, Tanzania. As the species was the oldest known Panthera species at the time, it was given the specific epithet "principialis", from the Latin word meaning "initial, original, in the beginning".

== Taxonomy & evolution ==
The fossils on which P. principialis was based had previously been assigned to the species Panthera leo, Panthera gombaszogensis, and Panthera palaeosinensis.

== Description ==
Panthera principialis was a lion-sized cat.
