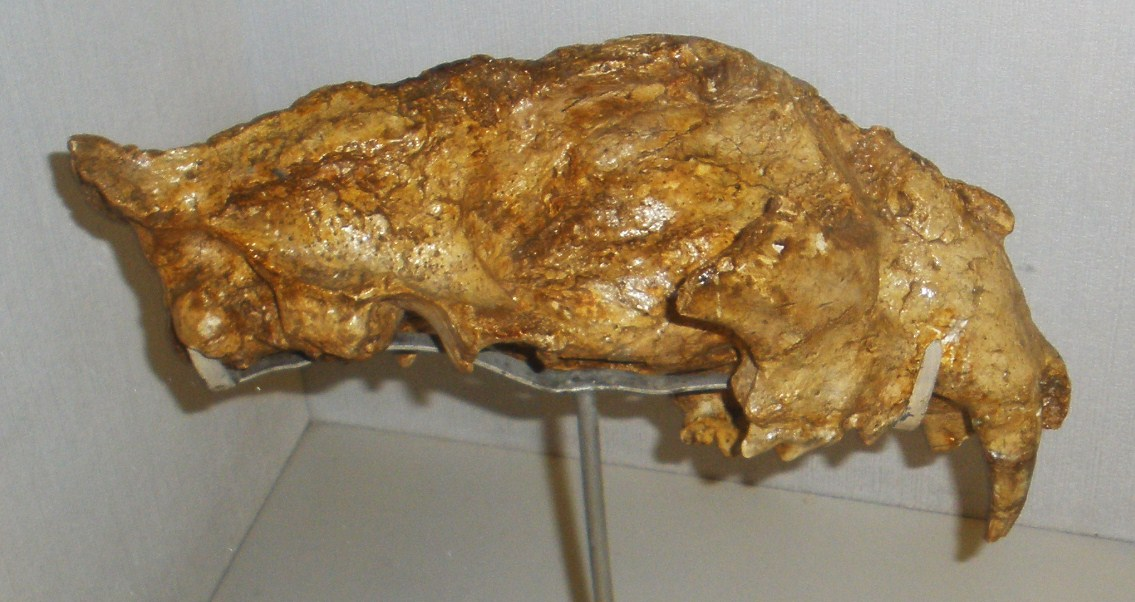
- Skull on display at the Museo di Storia Naturale di Firenze, Italy

Scientific classification
- Kingdom: Animalia
- Phylum: Chordata
- Class: Mammalia
- Order: Carnivora
- Family: Felidae
- Genus: Panthera
- Species: †P. gombaszogensis

Binomial name
- †Panthera gombaszogensis (Kretzoi, 1938)

Subspecies
- P. g. georgica (Hemmer, 2010); P. g. gombaszogensis; P. g. jinpuensis (Jiangzuo et al., 2022); P. g. toscana?

Synonyms
- Leo gombaszögensis Kretzoi, 1938; Panthera toscana Schaub, 1949; Panthera schreuderi Koenigswald, 1960; Jansofelis vaufreyi Bonifay, 1971; Panthera gombaszoegensis (lapsus calami)

= Panthera gombaszogensis =

Panthera gombaszogensis Temporal range: Early Pleistocene (Gelasian) to Middle Pleistocene, 2–0.3 Ma

Extinct European jaguar species

Panthera gombaszogensis, also known as the European jaguar or Eurasian jaguar, is a Panthera species that lived from about 2 million to 300,000 years ago in Europe, as well as likely elsewhere in Eurasia. The first fossils were excavated in 1938 in Gombasek Cave, Slovakia. P. gombaszogensis was a medium-large sized species that formed an important part of the European carnivore guild for a period of over a million years. Many authors have posited that it is the ancestor of the American jaguar (Panthera onca), with some authors considering it the subspecies Panthera onca gombaszogensis, though the close relationship between the two species has been questioned by some authors.

== Taxonomy ==
Leo gombaszögensis was the original scientific name proposed by Miklós Kretzoi in 1938 for teeth found in deposits in Gombasek Cave, Slovakia. The spelling of the species name is based on the Hungarian name of Gombasek, Gombaszög. Jan Wagner argued in 2011 that as the original name had a diacritic mark, the species name should be emended to P. gombaszogensis which conforms to International Commission on Zoological Nomenclature (ICZN) article 32.5.2, which requires names with diacritics to have them removed, normally without other change, except for umlauts in German-origin names made before 1985, which are emended to have an "e" after the former umlaut-bearing vowel. Wagner argued that as the name had a Hungarian origin, the German umlaut emendation rule was inapplicable, and thus the most common spelling of the species, P. gombaszoegensis is incorrect. The species was reassessed and placed in genus Panthera in 1971. The following are considered to belong to P. gombaszogensis as well:

- Panthera toscana proposed in 1949 for carnassial teeth found in Villafranchian deposits in the Val d'Arno in Italy. These remains were originally described as a distinct species and later as the subspecies Panthera gombaszogensis toscana. However, some argue P. g. toscana may not be a valid subspecies and is synonymous with P. g. gombaszogensis.
- Felis (Panthera) schreuderi proposed in 1960 for cat fossils found in Tegelen, the Netherlands.
- Jansofelis vaufreyi proposed in 1971 for cat fossils found in southeastern France.

Some remains once attributed to P. gombaszogensis have more recently been identified as the giant cheetah Acinonyx pardinensis. Fossil remains found in Liaoning in northeast China, has been classified as P. g. jinpuensis.

Panthera gombaszogensis has often been considered the direct ancestor of the American jaguar (Panthera onca) based on similarities between their tooth anatomy, with some studies (following Hemmer 1971) classifying it as a paleosubspecies of the American jaguar, P. onca gombaszogensis. A 2022 study based on a relatively complete skull found in Belgium alternatively suggested P. gombaszogensis is more closely related to the tiger (Panthera tigris) than the jaguar.

== Description ==
The European jaguar was larger than the modern-day jaguar, with the later subspecies Panthera gombaszogensis gombaszogensis estimated to weigh 90–120 kg (200–260 lb) in a 2001 study, with a large partial skeleton from the Middle Pleistocene Château Breccia in Saône-et-Loire, Burgundy, France estimated to weigh 130 kg (290 lb) in a later 2011 study. The proposed East Asian subspecies, P. g. jinpuensis was also large, with mandible dimensions suggesting it was as large as the largest modern male jaguars.

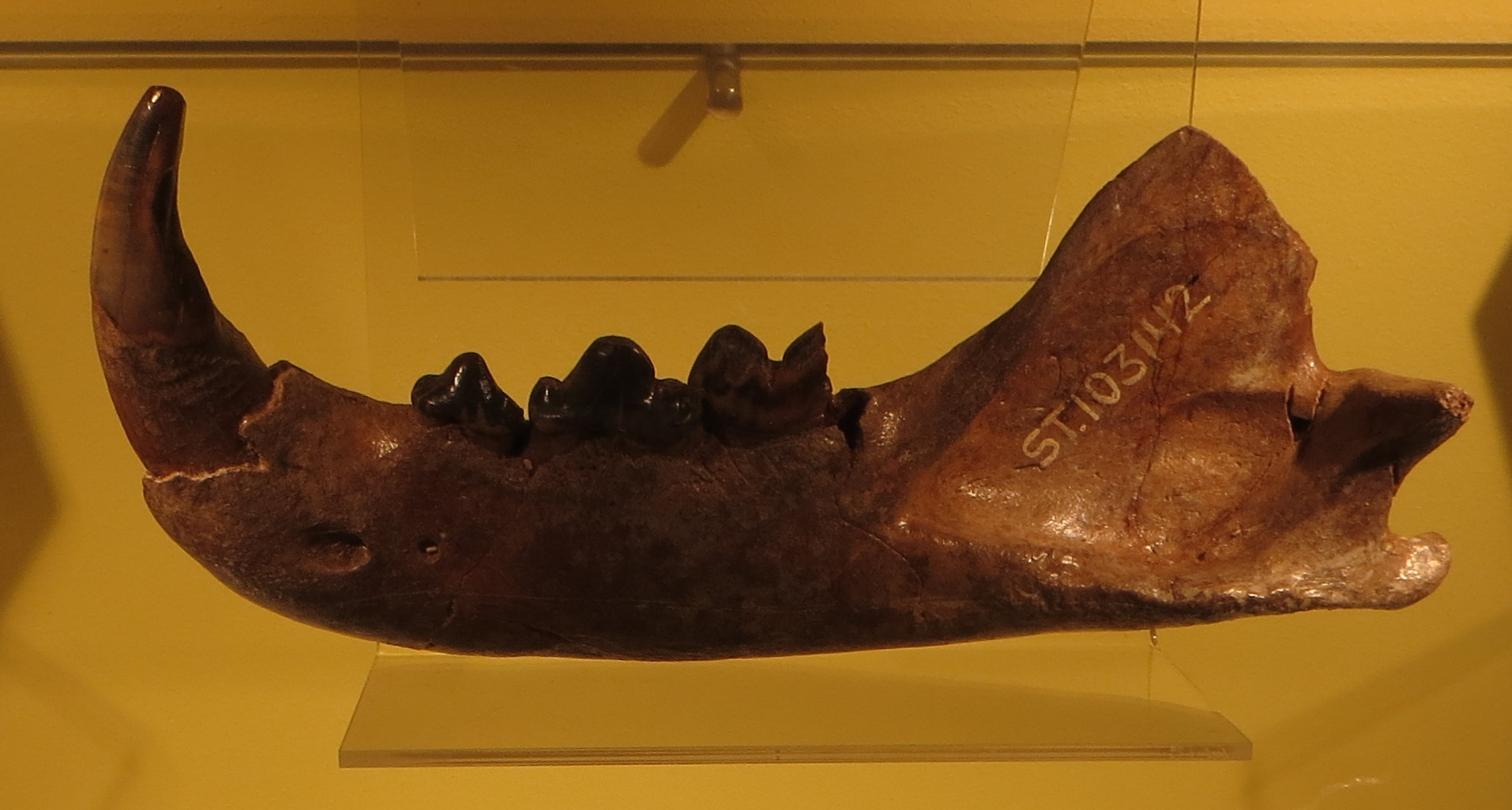
Mandible, Natural History Museum Rotterdam

It was probably capable of bringing down larger prey than the living jaguar. It is thought to have been sexually dimorphic, with significantly larger males than females. While it was often asserted that its body size increased with time, this has been disputed, with other authors finding no evidence of a clear pattern of body size evolution through time. The morphology of the lower jaw in particular closely resembles that of the jaguar, though the morphology of the skull displays considerable differences. Panthera gombaszogensis differs from the living jaguar in some dental characters, including having prominent vertical grooves on the upper canines (which are weak or absent in living jaguar) as well as differences in the robustness of the premolar teeth. The postcranial skeleton morphology has been described as leopard-like.

== Distribution and habitat ==
P. gombaszogensis is primarily known from records in Europe. Countries in Europe where P. gombaszogensis remains have been found include France, Spain, Italy, the Netherlands, Belgium, Britain (including the Cromer Forest Bed and Swanscombe), Germany (including Untermassfeld), Poland, the Czech Republic, Hungary, Slovakia, Romania, Montenegro, Bulgaria (Kozarnika cave), Greece, and southern Russia. Rarer records have been reported from elsewhere in Eurasia, including Georgia (including the Dmanisi site), Tajikistan, the Ubeidiya prehistoric site in Israel, possibly northern Saudi Arabia, Pakistan, northeast China, and Java in Indonesia.

The European jaguar is thought to have lived foremost in forests, but recent work suggests that its association with forest was not as strong as has often been assumed.

== Paleobiology ==
P. gombaszogensis is thought to have probably been a solitary hunter. A 2022 study suggested that based on its skull morphology, it was likely a generalist predator. Isotopic analysis of the ecosystem of Venta Micena in southern Spain, dating to the Early Pleistocene, suggests that at this locality the prey of P. gombaszogensis predominantly included the giant deer Praemegaceros verticornis and the smaller deer Metacervocerus rhenanus. These prey are suggestive that P. gombaszogensis inhabited forest at this locality. At the late Early Pleistocene locality of Untermassfeld in Germany, dating to around 1.1 million years ago, P. gombaszogensis is suggested to have primarily dwelt in forest and to have heavily preyed upon juvenile bison, as well as the large deer Eucladoceros giulii and possibly the fallow deer sized species Cervus nestii. The elk/moose ancestor Cervalces carnutorum, and the extinct roe deer Capreolus cusanoides have been suggested as less regular prey items. Analysis of specimens from Punta Lucero in northern Spain, dating to the early Middle Pleistocene, suggest at this locality at this locality Panthera gombaszogensis was an apex predator that consumed large prey, with prey consumed likely including aurochs, bison, red deer, and/or the giant deer Praemegaceros.

== Evolution and paleoecology ==
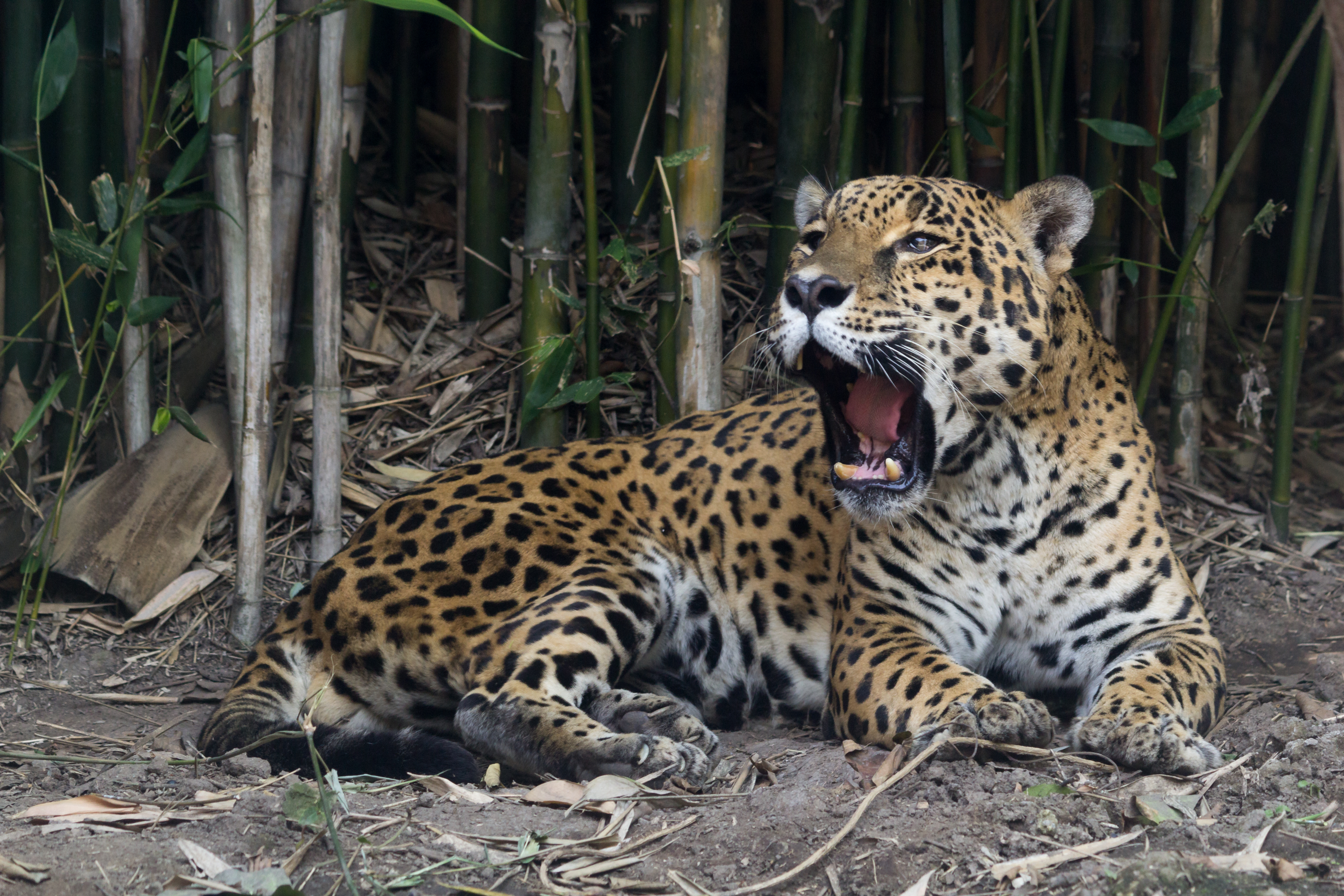
P. gombaszogensis has often been posited as the ancestor of the American jaguar (depicted)

The ancestors of P. gombaszogensis are thought to have arisen in Africa; a related form of Panthera (referred to as P. aff. gombaszogensis) was reported from Kromdraai in South Africa 1.9 Ma ago. While a 2011 study considered this record as the origin of P. gombaszogensis, other authors suggests to be cautious or disagree with linking this material to P. gombaszogensis. Specimens similar to P. gombaszogensis have also been found in other regions of Africa, while the first definitive appearance of P. gombaszogensis in Europe was around 1.9 million years ago.

P. gombaszogensis was initially the only European pantherine species in the Early Pleistocene, being present alongside the felines Acinonyx pardinensis (a larger relative of the modern cheetah) the primitive lynx Lynx issiodorensis, the cougar relative Puma pardoides, the machairodontine sabertooth cats Homotherium latidens and Megantereon, as well as the bear Ursus etruscus, the giant hyena Pachycrocuta, the early wolf ancestor Canis mosbachensis, and the pack-hunting wild dog Xenocyon lycaonoides. The Early-Middle Pleistocene transition around 1.2-0.6 million years ago saw the arrival of leopards and the large lion Panthera fossilis into Europe. The extinction of P. gombaszogensis in Europe, around 330–300,000 years ago, has been suggested to have been as a result of competition with lions, along with human pressure, while the cause of their extinction in Southeast Asia is suggested to be due to competition with tigers.

== See also ==
- Panthera atrox
- Panthera blytheae
- Panthera palaeosinensis
- Panthera shawi
- Panthera spelaea
- Panthera zdanskyi
- Panthera pardus spelaea
