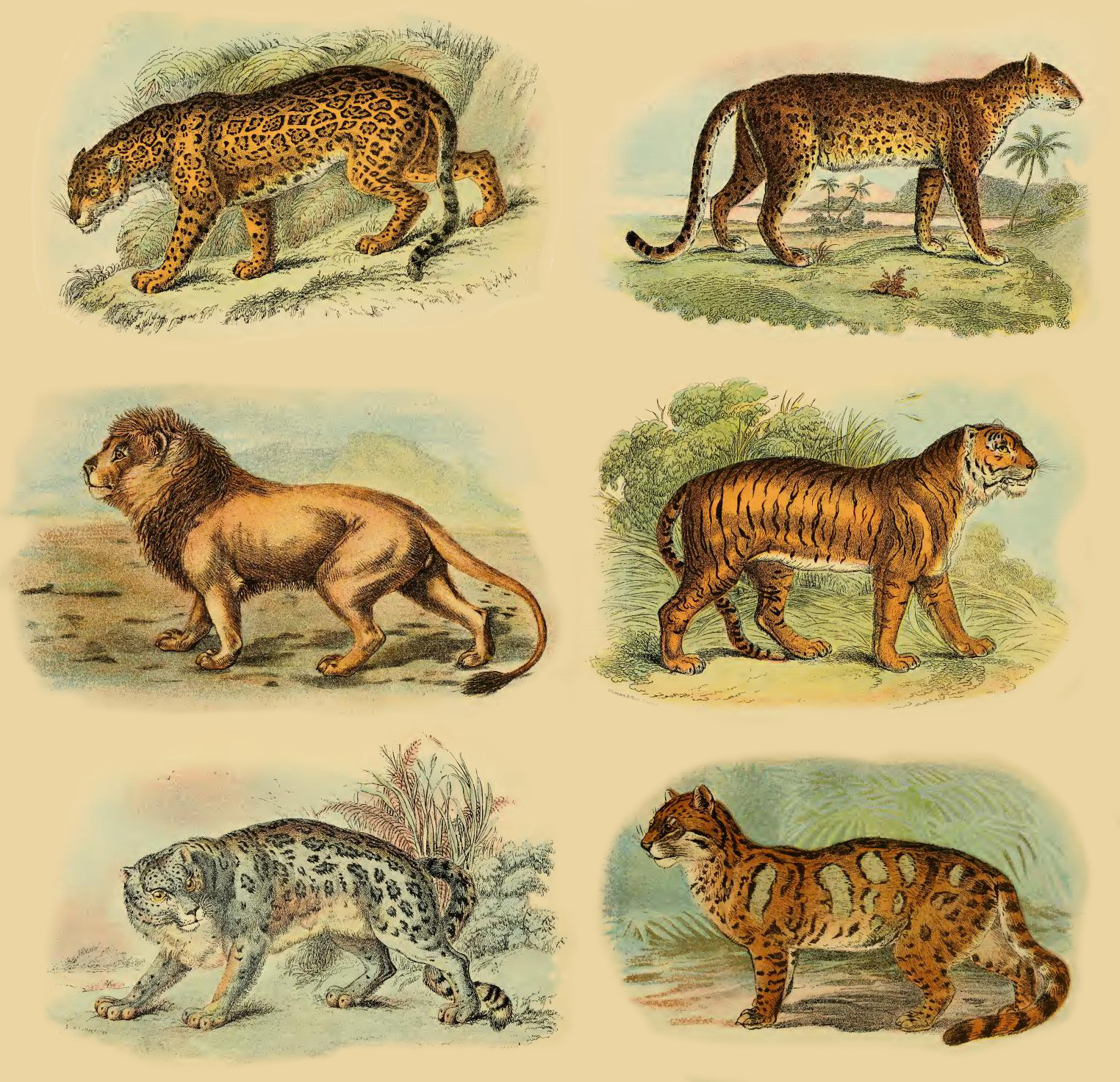
- Pantherinae subfamily members (from left): jaguar, leopard, lion, tiger, snow leopard and clouded leopard

Scientific classification
- Kingdom: Animalia
- Phylum: Chordata
- Class: Mammalia
- Order: Carnivora
- Family: Felidae
- Subfamily: Pantherinae; Pocock, 1917

Genera
- Neofelis Gray, 1867; Panthera Oken, 1816; †Feliopsis Stremme, 1911; †Leontoceryx Kretzoi, 1938; †Palaeopanthera Hemmer, 2023; †Pachypanthera de Bonis et al., 2023

= Pantherinae =

Pantherinae Temporal range: Late Miocene to Holocene

Subfamily of felids

The Pantherinae is a subfamily of the Felidae; it was named and first described by Reginald Innes Pocock in 1917 as only including the Panthera species, but later also came to include the clouded leopards (genus Neofelis). The Pantherinae genetically diverged from a common ancestor between 9.32 to 4.47 million years ago and 10.67 to 3.76 million years ago.

== Characteristics ==
Pantherinae species are characterised by an imperfectly ossified hyoid bone with elastic tendons that enable their larynx to be mobile. They have a flat rhinarium that only barely reaches the dorsal side of the nose. The area between the nostrils is narrow, and not extended sidewards as in the Felinae.

The Panthera species have a single, rounded, vocal fold with a thick mucosal lining, a large vocalis muscle, and a large cricothyroid muscle with long and narrow membranes. A vocal fold that is longer than 19 mm (0.75 in) enables all but the snow leopard among them to roar, as it has shorter vocal folds of 9 mm (0.35 in) that provide a lower resistance to airflow; this distinction was one reason it was proposed to be retained in the genus Uncia.

== Evolution ==
The Felidae originated in Central Asia in the Late Miocene; the subfamily Pantherinae diverged from the Felidae between 14.45 to 8.38 million years ago and 16.35 to 7.91 million years ago. Several fossil Panthera species have been described:

- Panthera principialis lived during the Early Pliocene around 3.7 million years ago in Tanzania.
- Panthera palaeosinensis lived in the Early Pleistocene around two million years ago in northern East Asia.
- Panthera zdanskyi is dated to 2.55 to 2.16 million years ago. It is possibly a junior synonym of P. palaeosinensis.
- Panthera gombaszogensis lived from about 2 to 0.35 million years ago in Europe.
- Panthera youngi lived in the Pleistocene about 0.69 to 0.42 million years ago in China.
- Panthera spelaea lived in Europe after the third Cromerian interglacial stage from about 450,000 to 14,000 years ago.
- Panthera atrox lived in North America during the Pleistocene and early Holocene about 340,000 to 11,000 years ago.
- Panthera shawi was a lion-like cat in South Africa that possibly lived in the early Pleistocene.
- Panthera balamoides lived in the Yucatan Peninsula in Mexico during the Pleistocene. Some researchers consider this species to be a bear instead.

An additional fossil genus Leontoceryx was described in 1938.

There is evidence of distinct markers for the mitochondrial genome for Felidae.

Results of a DNA-based study indicate that the tiger (Panthera tigris) branched off first, followed by the jaguar (P. onca), the lion (P. leo), then the leopard (P. pardus) and snow leopard (P. uncia).

Felis pamiri, first described in 1965 and once referred to as Metailurus in 1978, is now considered a probable relative of extant Pantherinae and was moved to the genus Miopanthera. However, this species was later reassigned as a species of a different genus Palaeopanthera, of which P. blytheae is the type species. P. blytheae was initially regarded as possibly the oldest known species of Panthera related to the modern snow leopard that lived during the Early Pliocene, but subsequent studies have since agreed that it is not a member of or a related species of the snow leopard lineage and that it belongs to a different genus.

== Taxonomy ==
Pocock originally defined the Pantherinae as comprising the genera Panthera and Uncia. Today, Uncia has been subsumed into Panthera, and the genus Neofelis is also included.

=== Living genera ===
The following table shows the extant taxa within the Pantherinae, grouped according to the traditional phenotypical classification.

Genus Neofelis – Gray, 1867 – two species
Common name	Scientific name and subspecies	Range	Size and ecology	IUCN status and estimated population
Clouded leopard	N. nebulosa (Griffith, 1821)	Central Nepal to continental Southeast Asia and southern China	Size: head to body 68.6–108 cm (27.0–42.5 in) with 61–91 cm (24–36 in) long tail Habitat: Forest and shrubland Diet: Medium-sized and small mammals on the ground and in trees, as well as birds	VU 3,700-5,600
Sunda clouded leopard	N. diardi Cuvier, 1823 Two subspecies: N. d. borneensis (Bornean clouded leopard); N. d. diardi (Sumatran clouded leopard)	Parts of Sumatra and Borneo	Size: 69–108 cm (27–43 in) long, 61–91 cm (24–36 in) tail Habitat: Forest Diet: Medium-sized and small mammals	VU 4,500

Genus Panthera – Oken, 1816 – five species
Common name	Scientific name and subspecies	Range	Size and ecology	IUCN status and estimated population
Jaguar	P. onca (Linnaeus, 1758)	Large swathes of South and Latin America, and Arizona in the United States	Size: 110–170 cm (43–67 in) long, 44–80 cm (17–31 in) tail Habitat: Forest, shrubland, inland wetlands, savanna, and grassland Diet: Variety of mammals, reptiles and birds, preferring ungulates	NT Unknown
Leopard	P. pardus (Linnaeus, 1758) Eight subspecies: P. p. delacouri (Indochinese leopard); P. p. fusca (Indian leopard); P. p. kotiya (Sri Lankan leopard); P. p. melas (Javan leopard); P. p. nimr (Arabian leopard); P. p. orientalis (Amur leopard); P. p. pardus (African leopard); P. p. tulliana (Persian leopard / Anatolian leopard)	Much of Sub-Saharan Africa, the Middle East, the Indian subcontinent, the Caucasus in Europe, Southeast Asia, and Siberia	Size: 91–191 cm (36–75 in) long, 51–101 cm (20–40 in) tail Habitat: Forest, desert, rocky areas, grassland, savanna, and shrubland Diet: Ungulates, as well as other mammals, insects, reptiles, and birds	VU Unknown
Lion	P. leo (Linnaeus, 1758) Two subspecies: P. l. leo; P. l. melanochaita	Sub-Saharan Africa and India	Size: 137–250 cm (54–98 in) long, 60–100 cm (24–39 in) tail Habitat: Forest, grassland, shrubland, savanna, and desert Diet: Ungulates such as antelopes, zebra, and wildebeest, as well as other small to large mammals	VU 23,000–39,000
Snow leopard	P. uncia (Schreber, 1775)	Himalayas reaching north to Mongolia	Size: 90–120 cm (35–47 in) long, 80–100 cm (31–39 in) tail Habitat: Shrubland, rocky areas, forest, and grassland Diet: Caprines such as sheep and goats, as well as small mammals and birds	VU 2,700–3,400
Tiger	P. tigris (Linnaeus, 1758) Two subspecies: P. t. sondaica (Sunda Island tiger); P. t. tigris (Mainland Asian tiger)	Scattered sections of Southeast Asia, Indian subcontinent, and Siberia	Size: 150–230 cm (59–91 in) long, 90–110 cm (35–43 in) tail Habitat: Shrubland, forest, and grassland Diet: Deer and wild pigs, as well as a wide variety of other animals	EN 2,600–3,900

== See also ==
- Big cat
- List of felids
