= Leontoceryx =

Leontoceryx Temporal range: Late Miocene

Scientific classification
- Kingdom: Animalia
- Phylum: Chordata
- Class: Mammalia
- Order: Carnivora
- Family: Felidae
- Subfamily: Pantherinae
- Genus: †Leontoceryx; Kretzoi, 1938

Type species
- Leontoceryx bessarabiae Kretzoi, 1938

Extinct genus of felid

Leontoceryx is an extinct, little-known genus of pantherine felid. It was named in 1938 by Hungarian palaeontologist Miklós Kretzoi based on a partial upper jaw fossil with only three teeth present.

The holotype specimen was originally described in 1916 and assigned to Machairodus schlosseri by Alexejew, though Otto Zdansky in 1924 expressed doubt as to that identification based on Alexejew's illustration, which lacked the chin ridge seen in M. schlosseri and did have a groove on the canine tooth characteristic of felines.

A second specimen, a single lower canine tooth, was described by Kretzoi in 1951. It came from a locality near Csákvár, Hungary, and was dated back to the Late Miocene.
