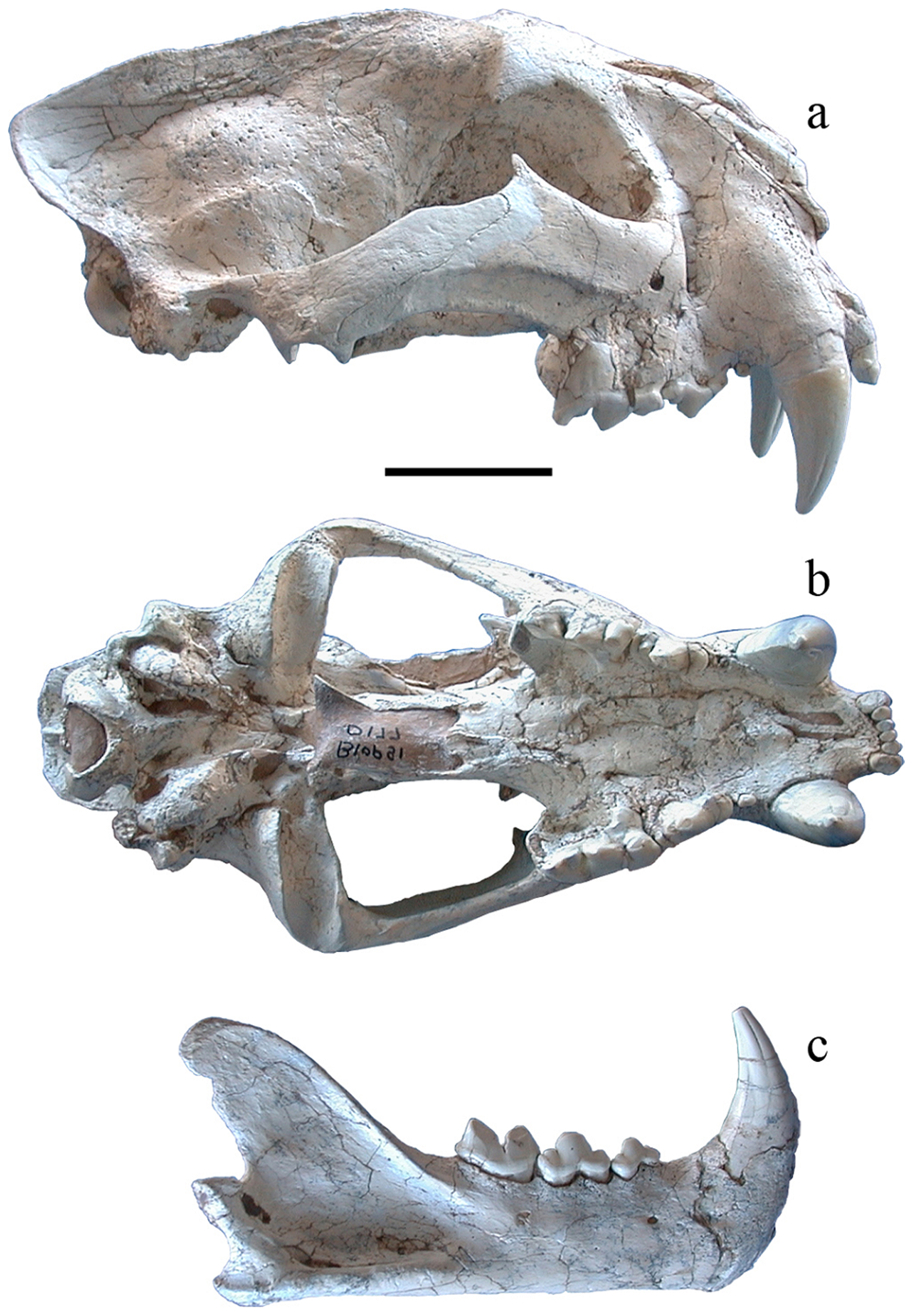
- Holotype skull

Scientific classification
- Kingdom: Animalia
- Phylum: Chordata
- Class: Mammalia
- Order: Carnivora
- Family: Felidae
- Genus: Panthera
- Species: †P. zdanskyi

Binomial name
- †Panthera zdanskyi Mazák, Christiansen & Kitchener, 2011

= Panthera zdanskyi =

Panthera zdanskyi Temporal range: Early Pleistocene, 2.55–2.16 Ma

Extinct species of carnivore

Panthera zdanskyi is an extinct pantherine species, the fossils of which were excavated in Gansu Province, northwestern China. Due to its close relationship with the modern tiger (Panthera tigris), it is called the Longdan tiger.

As of 2025, at least three recent studies considered P. zdanskyi likely to be a synonym of Panthera palaeosinensis, noting that its proposed differences from that species fell within the range of individual variation.

== Etymology ==
Panthera zdanskyi was first named by Ji H. Mazák, Per Christiansen and Andrew C. Kitchener in 2011. The specific name honors the Austrian paleontologist Otto A. Zdansky for his contributions to the understanding of Neogene Chinese fossil carnivorans.

== Description ==
The holotype of Panthera zdanskyi consists of a nearly complete skull and mandible stored at the Babiarz Institute of Paleontological Studies. It is the oldest known complete pantherine skull ever found, and it indicates that the animal was about the size of a jaguar. The paratype comprises a rostrum, premaxilla and maxilla and much of the dentition, originally referred to Panthera palaeosinensis. It was collected in 2004 in the eastern slope of Longdan, south of Dongxiang Autonomous County in the Lower Pleistocene Equus layer, dating to the Gelasian stage of the earliest Pleistocene, about 2.55–2.16 million years ago.

== Phylogeny ==
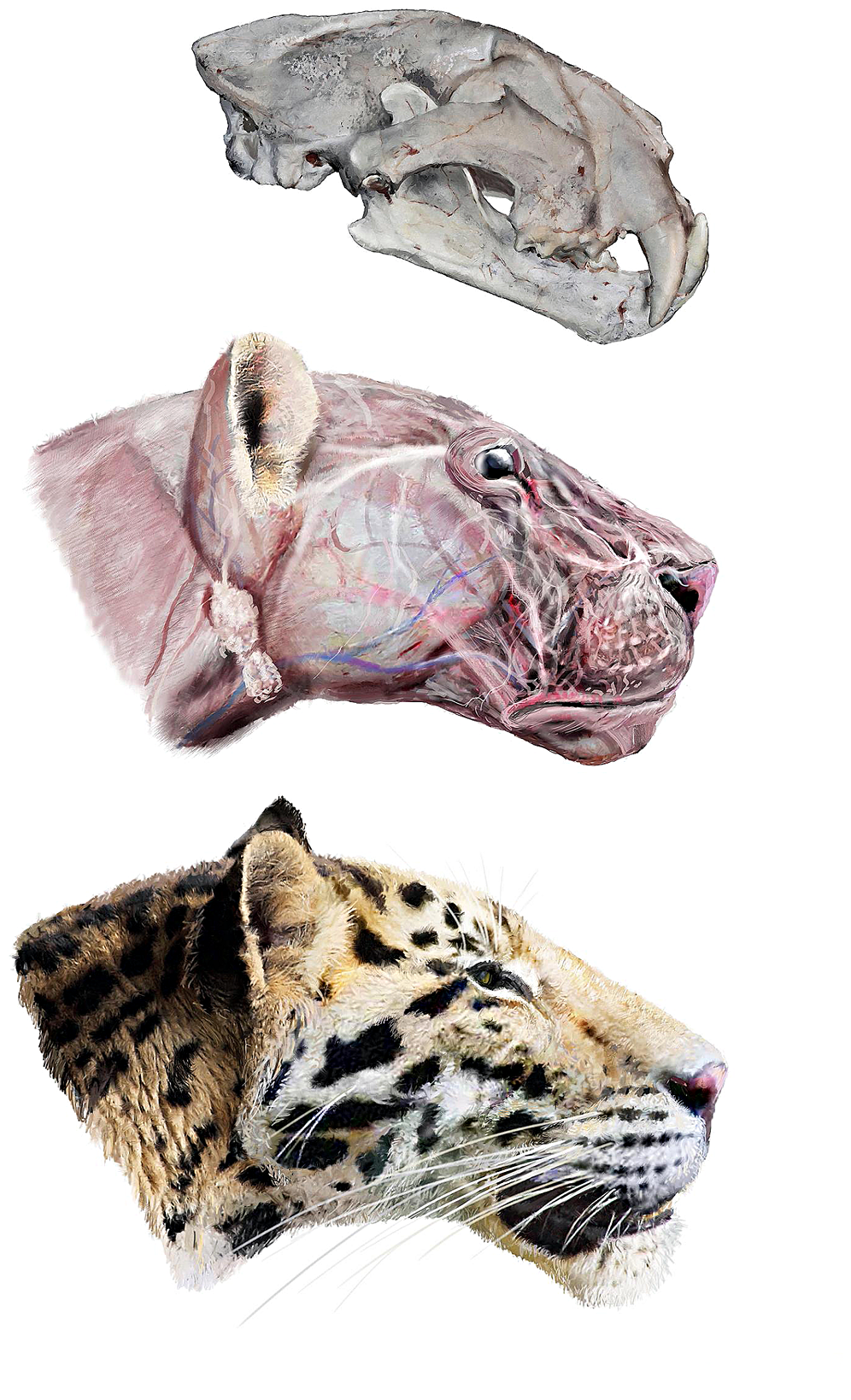
Restored skulls

The cladogram below follows Mazák, Christiansen and Kitchener (2011).

- Pantherinae
  - Neofelis
  - Panthera
    - Panthera uncia
    - - Panthera palaeosinensis†
      - - - Panthera onca
          - - Panthera atrox†
            - - Panthera spelaea†
              - - Panthera leo
                - Panthera pardus
        - - Panthera tigris
          - Panthera zdanskyi†

== See also ==
- Panthera blytheae
- Panthera gombaszoegensis
- Panthera shawi
- Panthera sondaica
- Panthera youngi
