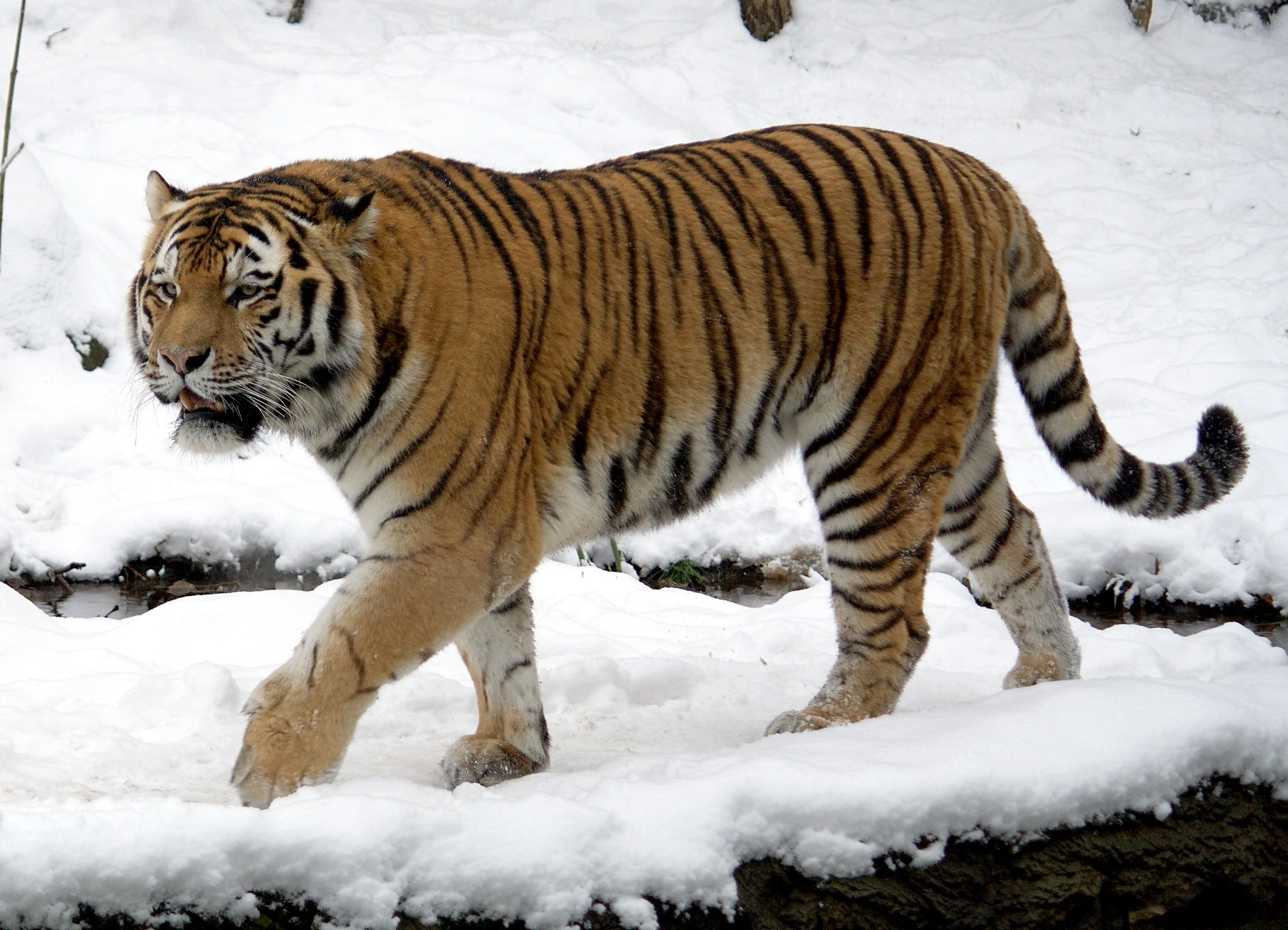
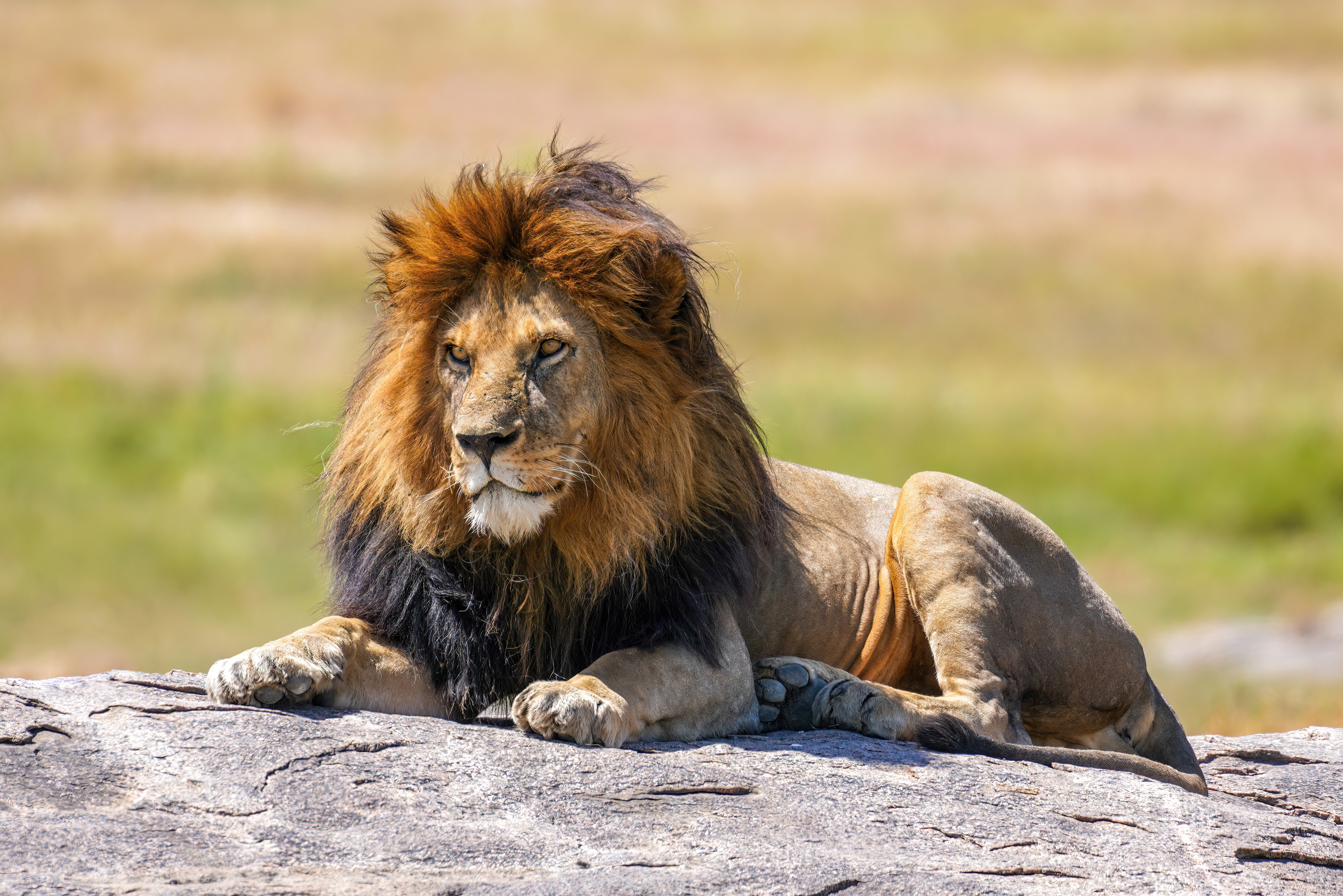
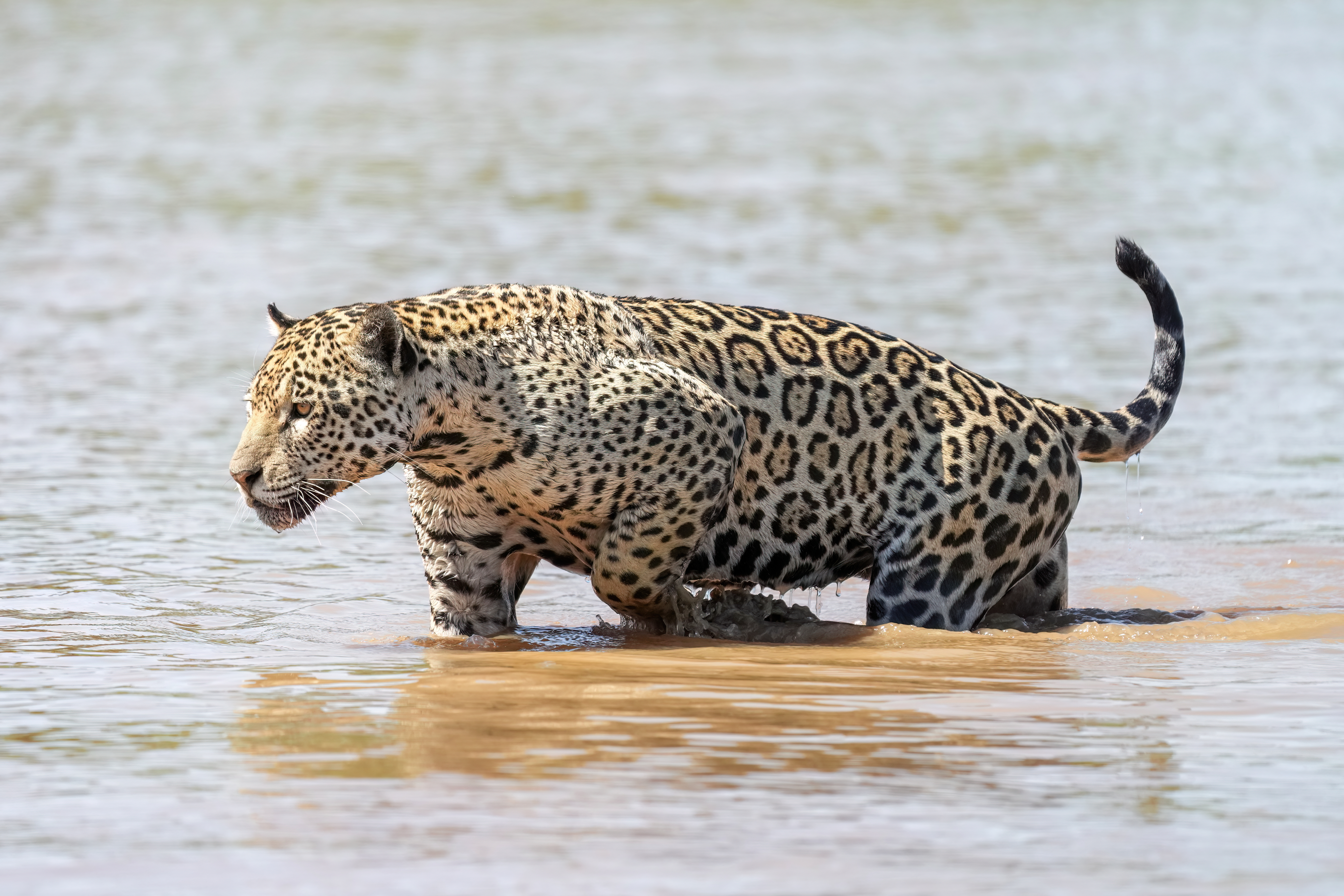
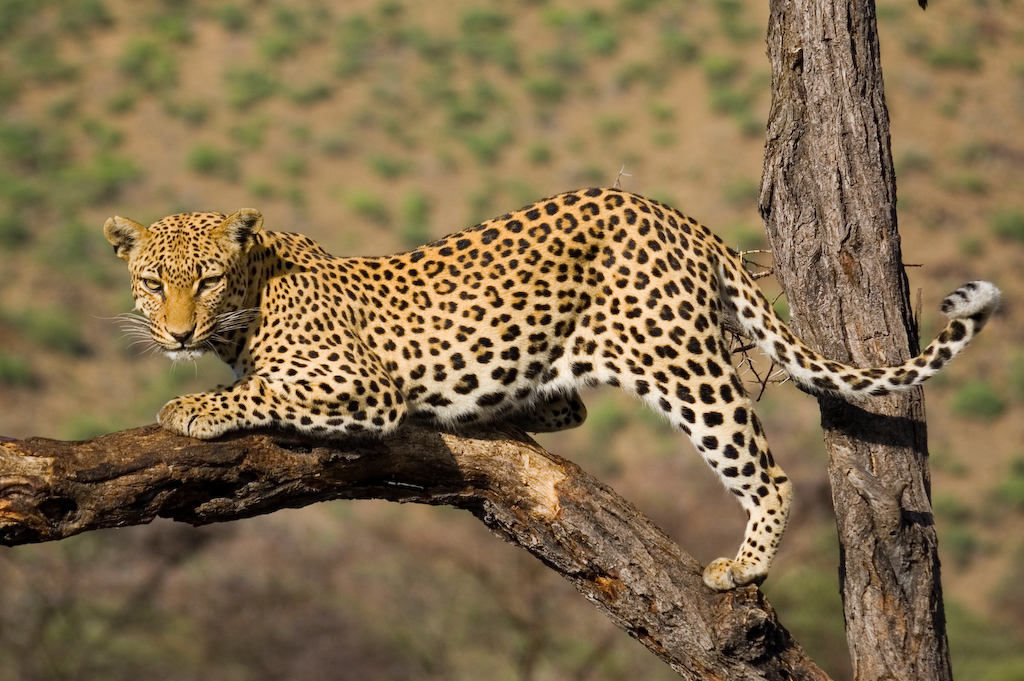
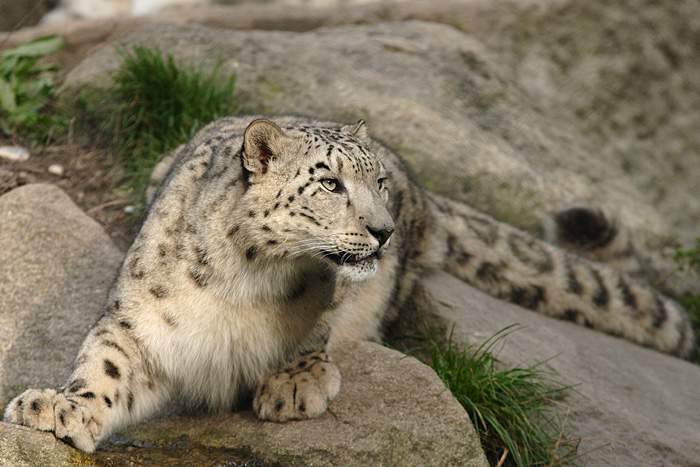
- From top to bottom: tiger, lion, jaguar, leopard, snow leopard

Scientific classification
- Kingdom: Animalia
- Phylum: Chordata
- Class: Mammalia
- Order: Carnivora
- Family: Felidae
- Subfamily: Pantherinae
- Genus: Panthera; Oken, 1816

Type species
- Felis pardus (= Panthera pardus) Linnaeus, 1758

Species
- List: Panthera leo (Linnaeus, 1758); Panthera onca (Linnaeus, 1758); Panthera pardus (Linnaeus, 1758); Panthera tigris (Linnaeus, 1758); Panthera uncia (Schreber, 1775); †Panthera atrox (Leidy, 1853); †Panthera balamoides Stinnesbeck et al., 2019; †Panthera fossilis (Reichenau, 1906); †Panthera gombaszogensis (Kretzoi, 1938); †Panthera palaeosinensis (Zdansky, 1924); †Panthera principialis Hemmer, 2023; †Panthera shawi (Broom, 1948); †Panthera spelaea (Goldfuss, 1810); †Panthera youngi Pei, 1934; †Panthera zdanskyi Mazák, Christiansen & Kitchener, 2011
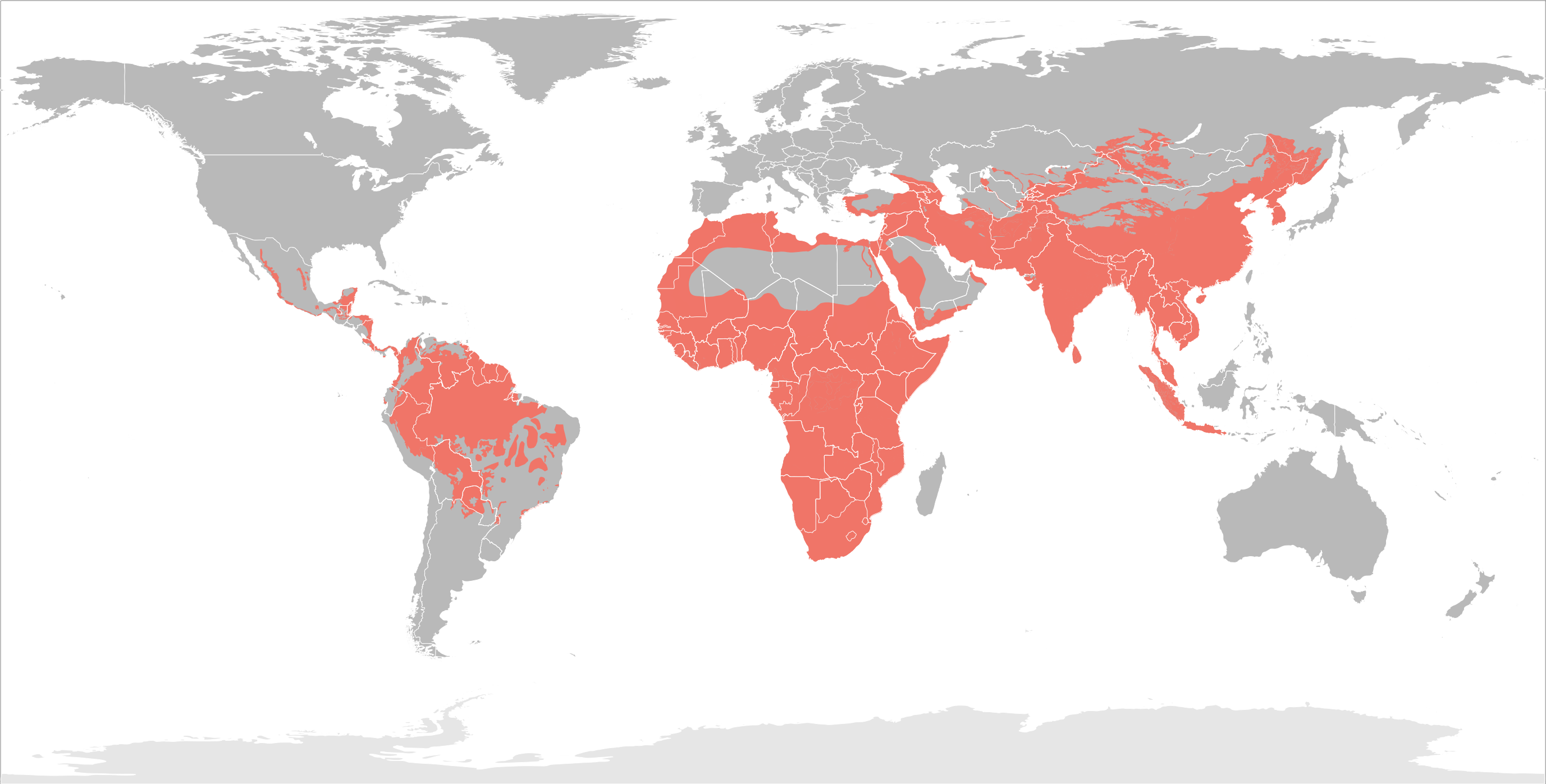
- Panthera distribution

Synonyms
- List: Jaguarius Severtzov, 1858; Leo Frisch, 1775; Leonina Greve, 1894; Leoninae Wagner, 1841; Pardotigris Kretzoi, 1929; Pardus Fitzinger, 1868; Tigrina Greve, 1894; Tigrinae Wagner, 1841; Tigris Gray, 1843; Tigris Frisch, 1775

= Panthera =

Panthera Temporal range: Pliocene–Present

Genus within Felidae

Panthera (Note: /ˈpænθərə, pænˈθiːrə/ PAN-thə-rə, pan-THEE-rə) is a genus within the family Felidae, and one of two extant genera in the subfamily Pantherinae. It contains the largest living members of the cat family. There are five living species: the jaguar, leopard, lion, snow leopard and tiger. Numerous extinct species included the cave lion and American lion.

== Etymology ==
The word panther derives from Classical Latin panthēra, itself from the Ancient Greek pánthēr (πάνθηρ).

== Characteristics ==
In Panthera species, the dorsal profile of the skull is flattish or evenly convex. The frontal interorbital area is not noticeably elevated, and the area behind the elevation is less steeply sloped. The basic cranial axis is nearly horizontal. The inner chamber of the bullae is large, the outer small. The partition between them is close to the external auditory meatus. The convexly rounded chin is sloping. All Panthera species have an incompletely ossified hyoid bone and a specially adapted larynx with large vocal folds covered in a fibro-elastic pad; these characteristics enable them to roar. Only the snow leopard cannot roar, as it has shorter vocal folds of 9 mm (0.35 in) that provide a lower resistance to airflow; it was therefore proposed to be retained in the genus Uncia. Panthera species can prusten, which is a short, soft, snorting sound; it is used during contact between friendly individuals. The roar is an especially loud call with a distinctive pattern that depends on the species.

== Evolution ==
Genetic studies indicate that the pantherine cats diverged from the subfamily Felinae between six and ten million years ago. The genus Neofelis is sister to Panthera.

The geographic origin of the genus Panthera is uncertain, though the earliest known definitive species Panthera principialis is from Tanzania. P. blytheae from northern Central Asia, originally described as the oldest known Panthera species, is suggested to have similar skull features to the snow leopard, but subsequent studies have since agreed that it is not a member of or a related species of the snow leopard lineage and that it belongs to a different genus Palaeopanthera. The tiger, snow leopard, and clouded leopard genetic lineages likely dispersed in Southeast Asia during the Late Miocene. The clouded leopard appears to have diverged about 8.66 million years ago. Panthera diverged from other cat species about 11.3 million years ago and then evolved into the species tiger about 6.55 million years ago, snow leopard about 4.63 million years ago and leopard about 4.35 million years ago. Mitochondrial sequence data from fossils suggest that the American lion (P. atrox) is a sister lineage to Panthera spelaea (the Eurasian cave or steppe lion) that diverged about 0.34 million years ago, and that both P. atrox and P. spelaea are most closely related to lions among living Panthera species. The snow leopard is nested within Panthera and is the sister species of the tiger.

The extinct species Panthera gombaszogensis, was probably closely related to the modern jaguar. The first fossil remains were excavated in Olivola, in Italy, and date to 1.6 million years ago. Fossil remains found in South Africa that appear to belong within the Panthera lineage date to about 2 to 3.8 million years ago.

== Classification ==
Panthera was named and described by Lorenz Oken in 1816 who placed all the spotted cats in this group. During the 19th and 20th centuries, various explorers and staff of natural history museums suggested numerous subspecies, or at times called "races", for all Panthera species. The taxonomist Reginald Innes Pocock reviewed skins and skulls in the zoological collection of the Natural History Museum, London, and grouped subspecies described, thus shortening the lists considerably. Reginald Innes Pocock revised the classification of this genus in 1916 as comprising the tiger (P. tigris), lion (P. leo), jaguar (P. onca), and leopard (P. pardus) on the basis of common features of their skulls. Since the mid-1980s, several Panthera species became subjects of genetic research, mostly using blood samples of captive individuals. Study results indicate that many of the lion and leopard subspecies are questionable because of insufficient genetic distinction between them. Subsequently, it was proposed to group all African leopard populations to P. p. pardus and retain eight subspecific names for Asian leopard populations. Results of genetic analysis indicate that the snow leopard (formerly Uncia uncia) also belongs to the genus Panthera (P. uncia), a classification that was accepted by IUCN Red List assessors in 2008.

Based on genetic research, it was suggested to group all living sub-Saharan lion populations into P. l. leo. Results of phylogeographic studies indicate that the Western and Central African lion populations are more closely related to those in India and form a different clade than lion populations in Southern and East Africa; southeastern Ethiopia is an admixture region between North African and East African lion populations.

Black panthers do not form a distinct species, but are melanistic specimens of the genus, most often encountered in the leopard and jaguar.

=== Contemporary species ===
The following list of the genus Panthera is based on the taxonomic assessment in Mammal Species of the World and reflects the taxonomy revised in 2017 by the Cat Classification Task Force of the Cat Specialist Group:

Species	Subspecies	IUCN Red List status and distribution
Lion P. leo (Linnaeus, 1758)	P. l. leo (Linnaeus, 1758) including: †Barbary lion P. l. leo sensu stricto; Asiatic lion syn. P. l. persica (Johann Nepomuk Meyer, 1826); P. l. melanochaita (Smith, 1842) including: †Cape lion P. l. melanochaita sensu stricto	VU
Jaguar P. onca (Linnaeus, 1758)	Monotypic	NT
Leopard P. pardus (Linnaeus, 1758)	African leopard P. p. pardus (Linnaeus, 1758) Indian leopard P. p. fusca (Meyer, 1794); Javan leopard P. p. melas (G. Cuvier, 1809); Arabian leopard P. p. nimr (Hemprich and Ehrenberg), 1833; P. p. tulliana (Valenciennes, 1856), syn. P. p. ciscaucasica (Satunin, 1914), P. p. saxicolor Pocock, 1927; Amur leopard P. p. orientalis (Schlegel, 1857), syn. P. p. japonensis (Gray, 1862); Indochinese leopard P. p. delacouri Pocock, 1930; Sri Lankan leopard P. p. kotiya Deraniyagala, 1956	VU
Tiger P. tigris (Linnaeus, 1758)	P. t. tigris (Linnaeus, 1758) including: Bengal tiger P. t. tigris sensu stricto; †Caspian tiger syn. P. t. virgata (Illiger, 1815); Siberian tiger syn. P. t. altaica (Temminck, 1844); South China tiger syn. P. t. amoyensis (Hilzheimer, 1905); Indochinese tiger syn. P. t. corbetti Mazák, 1968; Malayan tiger syn. P. t. jacksoni Luo et al., 2004; Sunda Island tiger P. t. sondaica Temminck, 1844) including: †Javan tiger P. t. sondaica sensu stricto; Sumatran tiger syn. P t. sumatrae (Temminck, 1844); †Bali tiger syn. P. t. balica Schwarz, 1912)	EN
Snow leopard P. uncia (Schreber, 1775)	Monotypic	VU

=== Extinct species and subspecies ===
Species and subspecies	Distribution	Temporal range	Notes	Images
Panthera atrox	North America, with dubious remains in South America.	0.13 to 0.013 MYA	Commonly known as the American lion, P. atrox is thought to have descended from a basal P. spelaea cave lion population isolated south of the Cordilleran Ice Sheet, and then established a mitochondrial sister clade circa 200,000 BP. It was sometimes considered a subspecies either under the nomenclature of P. leo or P. spelaea. One of the largest Panthera species. Became extinct around 13,000-12,000 years ago.	
Panthera balamoides	Mexico	~0.13 MYA	Dubious, other authors suggest that the remains are actually of the extinct bear Arctotherium instead.	
Panthera fossilis	Europe and Asia	0.68 to 0.25 MYA	Extinct species of lion known from the Middle Pleistocene of Europe and Asia. One of the largest known species of Panthera. Considered to be the ancestor of P. spelaea.	
Panthera gombaszogensis	Europe, possibly Asia and Africa	2.0 to 0.35 MYA	Ranged across Europe, as well as possibly Asia and Africa from around 2 million to 350,000 years ago. Often suggested to be the ancestor of the living jaguar (Panthera onca), and sometimes referred to as the "European jaguar". Panthera schreuderi and Panthera toscana are considered junior synonyms of P. gombaszogensis. It is occasionally classified as a subspecies of P. onca.	
Panthera palaeosinensis	Northern China	~3 MYA	Initially thought to be an ancestral tiger species, but several scientists place it close to the base of the genus Panthera At least three recent studies considered Panthera zdanskyi likely to be a synonym of P. palaeosinensis.	
Panthera principialis	Laetoli site in Tanzania	~3.7 MYA	A lion-sized species described in 2023. 20% larger than the similar P. shawi, which it was potentially ancestral to.	
Panthera shawi	South Africa	~3 MYA	The holotype is a single upper canine larger than that of the extant lion; other sparse remains are known.	
Panthera spelaea	Much of Eurasia	0.6 to 0.013 MYA	Commonly known as the cave lion or steppe lion. Originally spelaea was classified as a subspecies of the extant lion P. leo. Results of recent genetic studies indicate that it belongs to a distinct species, namely P. spelaea that is most closely related to the modern lion among living Panthera species. Other genetic results indicate that P. fossilis also warrants status as a species. It became extinct around 14,500-14,000 years ago.	
Panthera youngi	China	~0.35 MYA		
Panthera zdanskyi	Gansu province of northwestern China	2.55 to 2.16 MYA	It was initially considered to be a close relative of the tiger. But it is possibly synonymous with P. palaeosinensis.	
Panthera leo sinhaleyus	Sri Lanka		This lion subspecies was described on the basis of two teeth.	
Panthera onca augusta	North America		May have lived in temperate forests across North America	
Panthera onca mesembrina	South America		May have lived in grasslands in South America, unlike the modern jaguar	
Panthera pardus burgtonnae	Europe		Closely related to African leopard subspecies	
Panthera pardus spelaea	Europe		Closely related to Asiatic leopard subspecies	
Panthera tigris acutidens	Much of Asia		Not closely related to modern tiger subspecies	
Panthera tigris soloensis	Java, Indonesia		Not closely related to modern tiger subspecies	
Panthera tigris trinilensis	Java, Indonesia		Not closely related to modern tiger subspecies	

Other, now invalid, species have also been described, such as Panthera crassidens from South Africa, which was later found to be based on a mixture of leopard and cheetah fossils. A "Panthera dhokpathanensis" was briefly referenced in 1986 in a report on apparent new carnivorans from the Dhok Patha region in the Siwaliks, but as no description was provided this name is a nomen nudum.

=== Phylogeny ===
Results of a 2016 study based on analysis of biparental nuclear genomes suggest the following relationships of living Panthera species:

- Felidae
  - Felinae
  - - Pantherinae
      - Panthera
        - - - Lion
            - Leopard
          - Jaguar
        - - Snow leopard
          - Tiger
      - Neofelis

Two cladograms proposed for Panthera. The upper one is based on phylogenetic studies by Johnson et al. (2006), and by Werdelin et al. (2010). The lower cladogram is based on a study by Davis et al. (2010) and by Mazák et al. (2011).

In 2018, results of a phylogenetic study on living and fossil cats were published. This study was based on the morphological diversity of the mandibles of saber-toothed cats, their speciation and extinction rates.

- Panthera
  - †Panthera palaeosinensis
  - - - - †Panthera blytheae
        - Snow leopard
    - - - †Panthera zdanskyi
        - Tiger
  - - - - †Panthera gombaszogensis (sometimes called the European jaguar)
        - Jaguar
    - - - Leopard
        - - Lion
          - - †Panthera spelaea (cave lion or steppe lion)
            - †Panthera atrox (American lion)

== See also ==
- Panthera hybrid
- Panther (legendary creature)
