= Panthera tigris acutidens =

Panthera tigris acutidens Temporal range: Early Pleistocene - Middle Pleistocene, 2–0.5 Ma

Scientific classification
- Kingdom: Animalia
- Phylum: Chordata
- Class: Mammalia
- Order: Carnivora
- Family: Felidae
- Genus: Panthera
- Species: P. tigris
- Subspecies: †P. t. acutidens

Trinomial name
- †Panthera tigris acutidens (Zdansky, 1928)

Synonyms
- Felis acutidens Zdansky, 1928

Extinct subspecies of carnivore

Panthera tigris acutidens or Wanhsien tiger is an extinct tiger subspecies, which was scientifically described in 1928 based on fossils excavated near Wanhsien in southern China's Sichuan Province. Otto Zdansky named it Felis acutidens. After the fossils were re-examined in 1947, they were attributed to Panthera tigris acutidens by Dirk Albert Hooijer and Walter W. Granger.

== Description ==
The P. t. acutidens fossils from Wanhsien in the collection of the American Museum of Natural History consist of two skulls, a humerus, two metacarpals, a tibia, an astragalus, two calcanea, and five metatarsals, and several parts of jaws. The tibia is 29.7 cm (11.7 in) long and 8.1 cm (3.2 in) in diameter. The humerus is 30.6 cm (12.0 in) long and slightly smaller in width, length and diameter than humeri of Siberian tiger. It would have weighed 200 to 350 kg (440 to 770 lb) in body mass.

== See also ==
- Bornean tiger
- Panthera tigris soloensis
- Panthera tigris trinilensis
- Panthera zdanskyi
