= Panthera youngi =

Panthera youngi Temporal range: Middle Pleistocene

Scientific classification
- Kingdom: Animalia
- Phylum: Chordata
- Class: Mammalia
- Order: Carnivora
- Family: Felidae
- Genus: Panthera
- Species: †P. youngi

Binomial name
- †Panthera youngi (Pei, 1934)

Synonyms
- Felis youngi Pei, 1934; Uncia youngi (Pei, 1934)

Extinct species of carnivore

Panthera youngi is an extinct species of pantherine felid which lived in northeastern China during the Middle Pleistocene. Originally assigned to the genus Felis, the species was described by Chinese paleontologist Pei Wenzhong in 1934 based on fossil remains excavated in the Zhoukoudian Peking Man Site. It is estimated to have lived about 350,000 years ago in the Pleistocene epoch. It was suggested that it was conspecific with Panthera atrox and P. spelaea due to their extensive similarities. Some dental similarities were also noted with the older P. fossilis, however, Panthera youngi showed more derived features. Putative fossils of this species, tiger and leopard have been discovered in Japan, but mitochondrial and nuclear genome analysis indicates that they represent P. spelaea.
