= Panthera tigris soloensis =

Panthera tigris soloensis Temporal range: Pleistocene

Scientific classification
- Kingdom: Animalia
- Phylum: Chordata
- Class: Mammalia
- Order: Carnivora
- Family: Felidae
- Genus: Panthera
- Species: P. tigris
- Subspecies: †P. t. soloensis

Trinomial name
- †Panthera tigris soloensis Koenigswald, 1933

Synonyms
- Panthera sondaica Temminck 1845

Subspecies of mammal

Panthera tigris soloensis, known as the Ngandong tiger, is an extinct subspecies of the modern tiger species. It inhabited the Sundaland region of Indonesia during the Pleistocene epoch.

== Discoveries ==
Fossils of P. t. soloensis were excavated primarily near the village of Ngandong, hence the common name. Only seven fossils are known, making study of the animal difficult.

== Description ==
Some remains of P. t. soloensis suggest that it would have been about the size of a modern Bengal tiger. However, given the size of other remains, it may have been larger than a modern tiger. A large male could have weighed around 400 kg (880 lb), in which case it would have been heavier than the largest extant tiger subspecies, rendering it among the largest felids known to have ever lived. In 2016, P. t. soloensis was estimated to weigh 184 kg (406 lb) on average, with the largest specimen estimated to weigh 298 kg (657 lb).

== Paleoecology ==
In addition to the remains of the Ngandong tiger, many other fossils from the same era have been discovered in Ngandong, like the proboscideans Stegodon trigonocephalus and Elephas hysudrindicus, the bovines Bubalus palaeokerabau and Bos palaesondaicus, the extant perissodactyls Tapirus indicus and Rhinoceros sondaicus, and a great variety of cervine species. Homo erectus soloensis fossils are also known from the area.

== See also ==
- Bornean tiger
- Prehistoric tigers: Panthera tigris trinilensis · Panthera tigris acutidens
- Panthera zdanskyi
