= Panthera shawi =

Panthera shawi Temporal range: Late Pliocene

Scientific classification
- Kingdom: Animalia
- Phylum: Chordata
- Class: Mammalia
- Order: Carnivora
- Family: Felidae
- Genus: Panthera
- Species: †P. shawi

Binomial name
- †Panthera shawi (Broom, 1948)

Synonyms
- Felis shawi Broom, 1948; Panthera leo shawi

Extinct cat species from South African Pleistocene

Panthera shawi is an extinct prehistoric big cat, of which a single canine tooth was excavated in Sterkfontein cave in South Africa by Robert Broom in the 1940s. It is thought to be one of the oldest known Panthera species in Africa.

== Taxonomy ==
The original and holotype specimen, a single upper canine tooth from the Bolt's Farm locality, was described by Broom in 1948 as a new species named Felis shawi in honour of Professor Shaw. Further material assigned to the species was recovered from the Kromdraai A and Swartkraans Member 2 localities.

It was later considered a subspecies Panthera leo as Panthera leo shawi by some authors.

The few remnants of the massive P. shawi from the Early Pleistocene sites in South Africa that have been examined thus far metrically and morphologically resemble M. leo in the majority of features, but they do not actually represent lions, supporting their original descriptions and defending their own species status. The bridge between P. leo and P. shawi facilitates the interpretation of modern lion variability. However, its absolute size exceeds that of extant lions and is significantly surpassed by a specimen from the North American Late Pleistocene.

== Description ==
The canine tooth is considerably larger and thicker at the base than that of a modern lion. The tooth crown measures 31 mm × 24 mm (1.22 in × 0.94 in) at the base and is 67.5 mm (2.66 in) long.
