= List of carnivorans described in the 21st century =

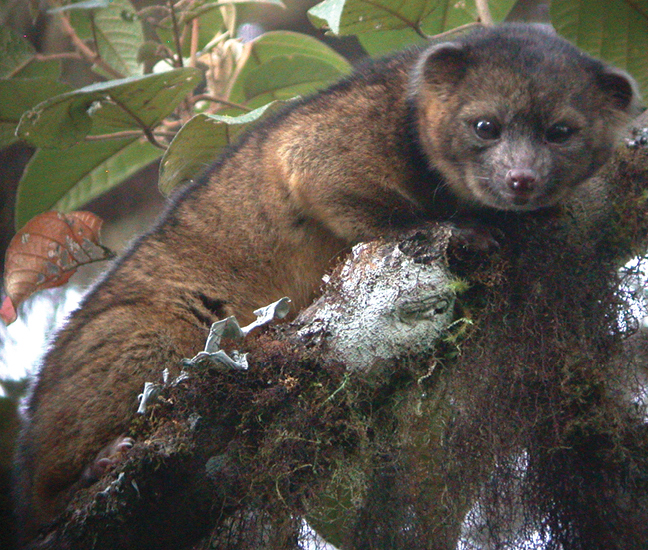
The olinguito, first recognized as a distinct species in 2013

This page is a list of species of the order Carnivora discovered in the 2000s. The order also contains animals once classified separately in Pinnipedia. See also parent page, Mammals discovered in the 2000s.

== Bornean clouded leopard, Neofelis diardi (2007) ==
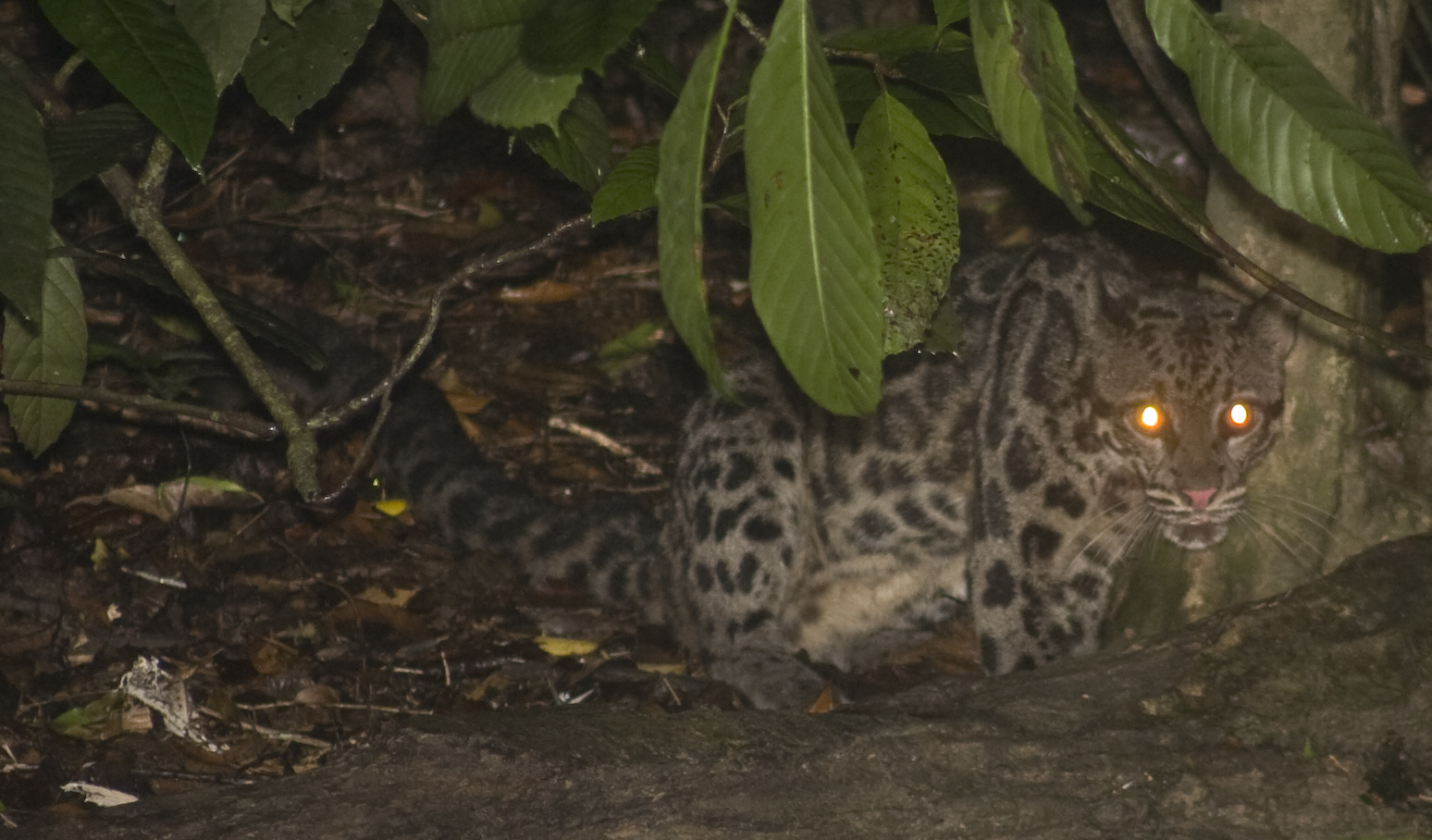
Bornean clouded leopard

Neofelis diardi is a medium-sized wild cat found on Borneo, Sumatra and the Batu Islands in the Malay Archipelago and publicised under the name Bornean clouded leopard by the World Wide Fund for Nature (WWF) on March 14, 2007. Its coat is marked with irregularly-shaped, dark-edged ovals, which are said to be shaped like clouds, hence its common name. Though scientists have known of its existence since the early 19th century, it was positively identified as being a distinct species in its own right in 2006, having long been believed to be a subspecies of the mainland clouded leopard (Neofelis nebulosa). WWF quoted Dr. Stephen O'Brien of the U.S. National Cancer Institute as saying, "Genetic research results clearly indicate that the clouded leopard of Borneo should be considered a separate species". Some journalists have pointed out, though, that this taxon is previously known as a subspecies, and claim that the WWF announcement of a new species was more designed to draw attention to its endangered status.

== Qinling panda, Ailuropoda melanoleuca qinlingensis (2005) ==
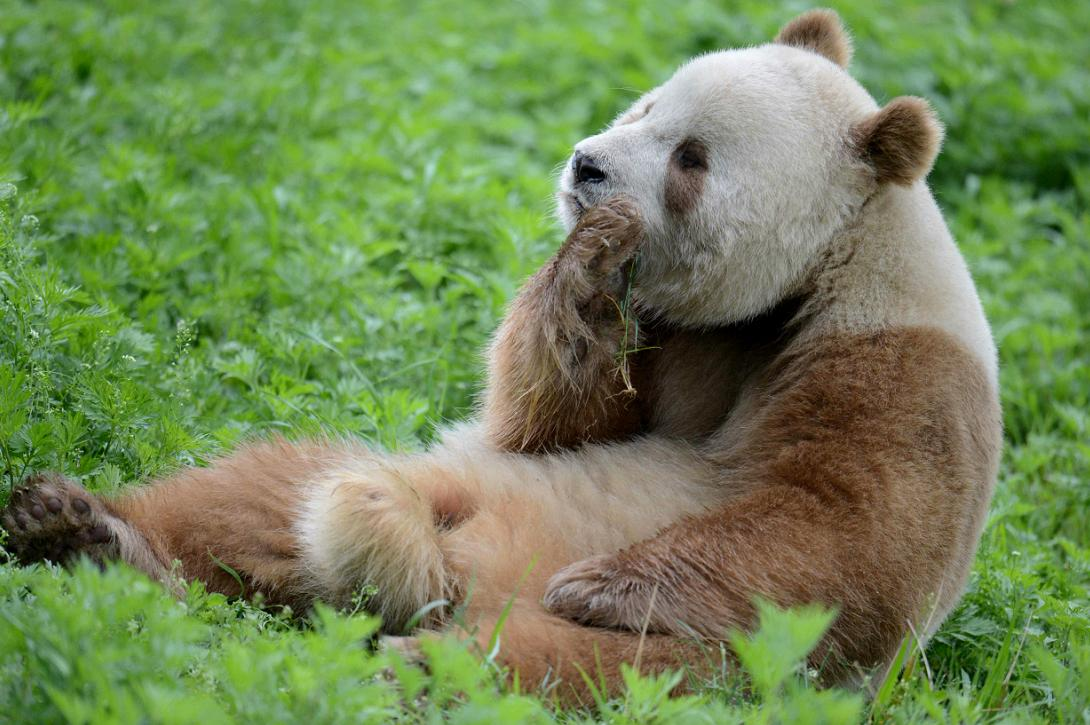
The Qinling panda, distinguished by its brown patches, was recognized as a subspecies in 2005

In 2005, it was announced that research had concluded that the giant panda (Ailuropoda melanoleuca) population in the Qinling Mountains, China, was sufficiently different from other pandas to warrant the creation of a new subspecies, Ailuropoda melanoleuca qinlingensis. Among other differences, the Qinling panda has brown and white coloration, replacing the familiar black and white fur of typical giant pandas.

== Lowe's servaline genet, Genetta servalina lowei (2002) ==
In 2002, Lowe's servaline genet (Genetta servalina lowei) was photographed by a camera trap in Tanzania. Its rediscovery marks the first time the viverrid had been recorded since its type specimen, a single pelt, was collected in 1932.

== Mellivora capensis buechneri (2000) ==
A new subspecies of the honey badger was discovered in Turkmenistan in 2000. It is similar to the subspecies M. c. indica and M. c. inaurita, but has differences, including a larger size.

== Civettictis civetta pauli (2000) ==
A new subspecies of the African civet was described based on a skull found in December 1999 in southeastern Djibouti.

== Olinguito (2013) ==
The olinguito, living in the Andean cloud forest, was categorized as a distinct species in 2013. It had previously been identified as a small olingo.
