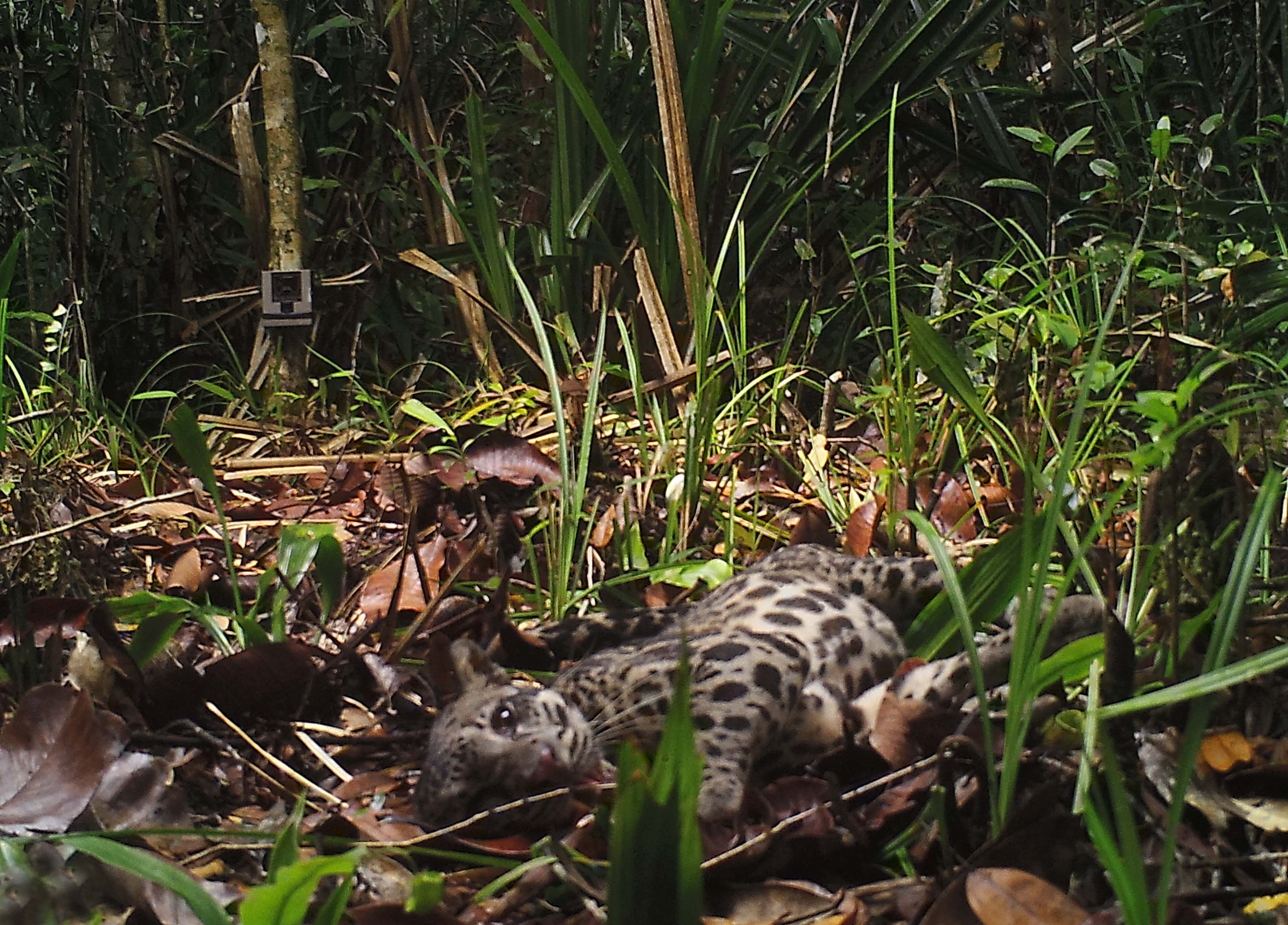
- A Sumatran clouded leopard recorded by a camera trap in Riau Ecosystem Restoration

Scientific classification
- Kingdom: Animalia
- Phylum: Chordata
- Class: Mammalia
- Order: Carnivora
- Family: Felidae
- Genus: Neofelis
- Species: N. diardi
- Subspecies: N. d. diardi

Trinomial name
- Neofelis diardi diardi (Cuvier, 1823)

= Sumatran clouded leopard =

Sunda clouded leopard subspecies

The Sumatran clouded leopard (Neofelis diardi diardi) is a subspecies of the Sunda clouded leopard and is native to the Indonesian islands of Sumatra and Batu. It differs in molecular, craniomandibular and dental characteristics from the Bornean clouded leopard. It was recognized as a valid subspecies in 2017.

== Distribution and habitat ==
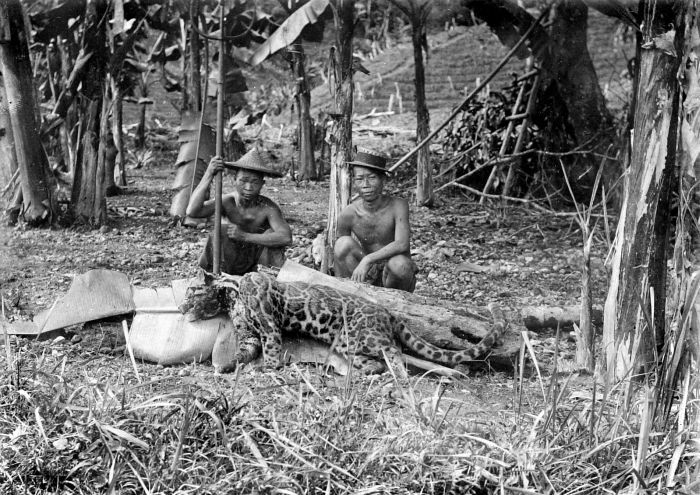
A Sumatran clouded leopard killed between 1910 and 1925

It was recorded in Sumatra's Kerinci Seblat, Gunung Leuser and Bukit Barisan Selatan National Parks.

== Evolution ==
The Sumatran clouded leopard is estimated to have diverged from the Bornean clouded leopard in the Late Pleistocene, between 400 and 120 thousand years ago. Land bridges that were created due to low sea levels in the Late Pleistocene were submerged by rising sea levels, resulting in the Sumatran clouded leopard becoming separated from the mainland population at this time.

== See also ==
- Big cat
- Sumatran tiger
- Sunda Islands
