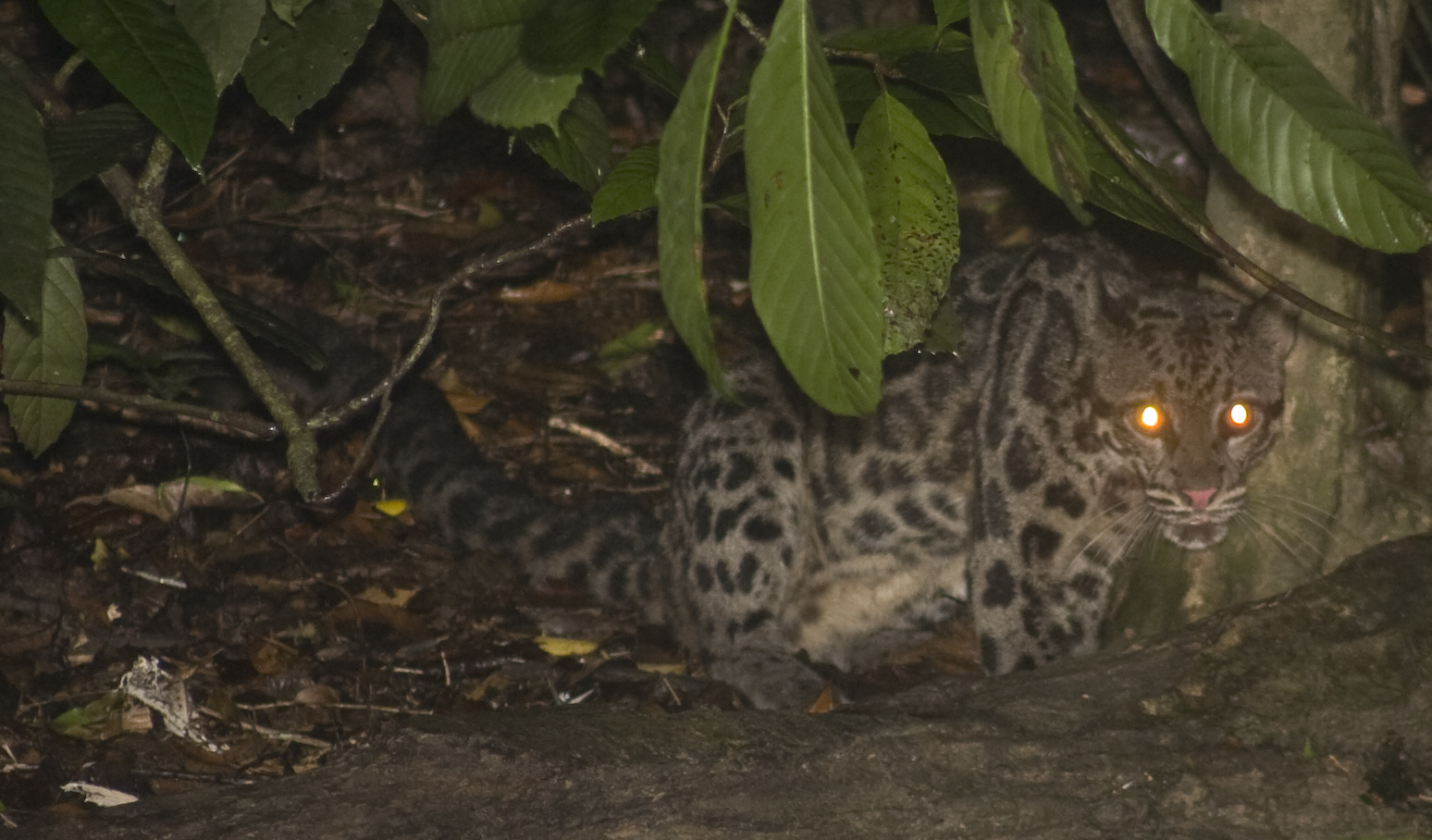
- A Bornean clouded leopard along the lower Kinabatangan, eastern Sabah, Malaysia

Conservation status
- Vulnerable (IUCN 3.1)

Scientific classification
- Kingdom: Animalia
- Phylum: Chordata
- Class: Mammalia
- Order: Carnivora
- Family: Felidae
- Genus: Neofelis
- Species: N. diardi
- Subspecies: N. d. borneensis

Trinomial name
- Neofelis diardi borneensis Wilting, Christiansen, Kitchener, Kemp, Ambu and Fickel, 2007

= Bornean clouded leopard =

Subspecies of Sunda clouded leopard

The Bornean clouded leopard (Neofelis diardi borneensis) is a subspecies of the Sunda clouded leopard. It is native to the island of Borneo, and differs from the Sumatran clouded leopard in the shape and frequency of spots, as well as in cranio-mandibular and dental characters. In 2017, the Cat Classification Taskforce of the Cat Specialist Group recognized the validity of this subspecies.

== Habitat and distribution ==
In Kalimantan, it was recorded in Sabangau National Park.

In northern Sarawak, it was recorded in mixed dipterocarp forest outside a protected area at elevations of 1,000 to 1,215 m (3,281 to 3,986 ft).

In Sabah, it was recorded in Danum Valley Conservation Area, Ulu Segama, Malua and Kabili-Sepilok Forest Reserves, Tabin Wildlife Reserve and the Lower Kinabatangan Wildlife Sanctuary.

== Ecology ==
Results of a camera-trapping survey revealed that it is largely nocturnal. A radio-collared female had a home range of around 23 km^{2} (8.9 sq mi) in 109 days.

== Evolution ==
The Bornean clouded leopard is estimated to have diverged from the Sumatran clouded leopard in the Late Pleistocene, between 400 and 120 thousand years ago. Land bridges that were created due to low sea levels in the Late Pleistocene were submerged by rising sea levels, resulting in the Bornean clouded leopard becoming separated from the mainland population at this time. It was recognized as its own subspecies in 2007 following an analysis of the genetic substructure of the Bornean and Sumatran clouded leopards, which concluded that there was enough genetic variation to recognize the Sumatran Neofelis diardi diardi and the Bornean Neofelis diardi borneensis as two different subspecies.

== Threats ==
The Bornean clouded leopard is considered vulnerable, similar to other Neofelis species, due to anthropogenic disturbances such as deforestation, illegal poaching, and hunting pressure. In Sabah, habitat loss is primarily driven by the development of oil palm plantations, which inhibits connectivity of the Bornean clouded leopard population. Deforestation in Borneo caused substantial reduction of habitat connectivity and population size of the Bornean clouded leopard.

== See also ==
- Bay cat
- Bornean tiger
- Sunda Islands
