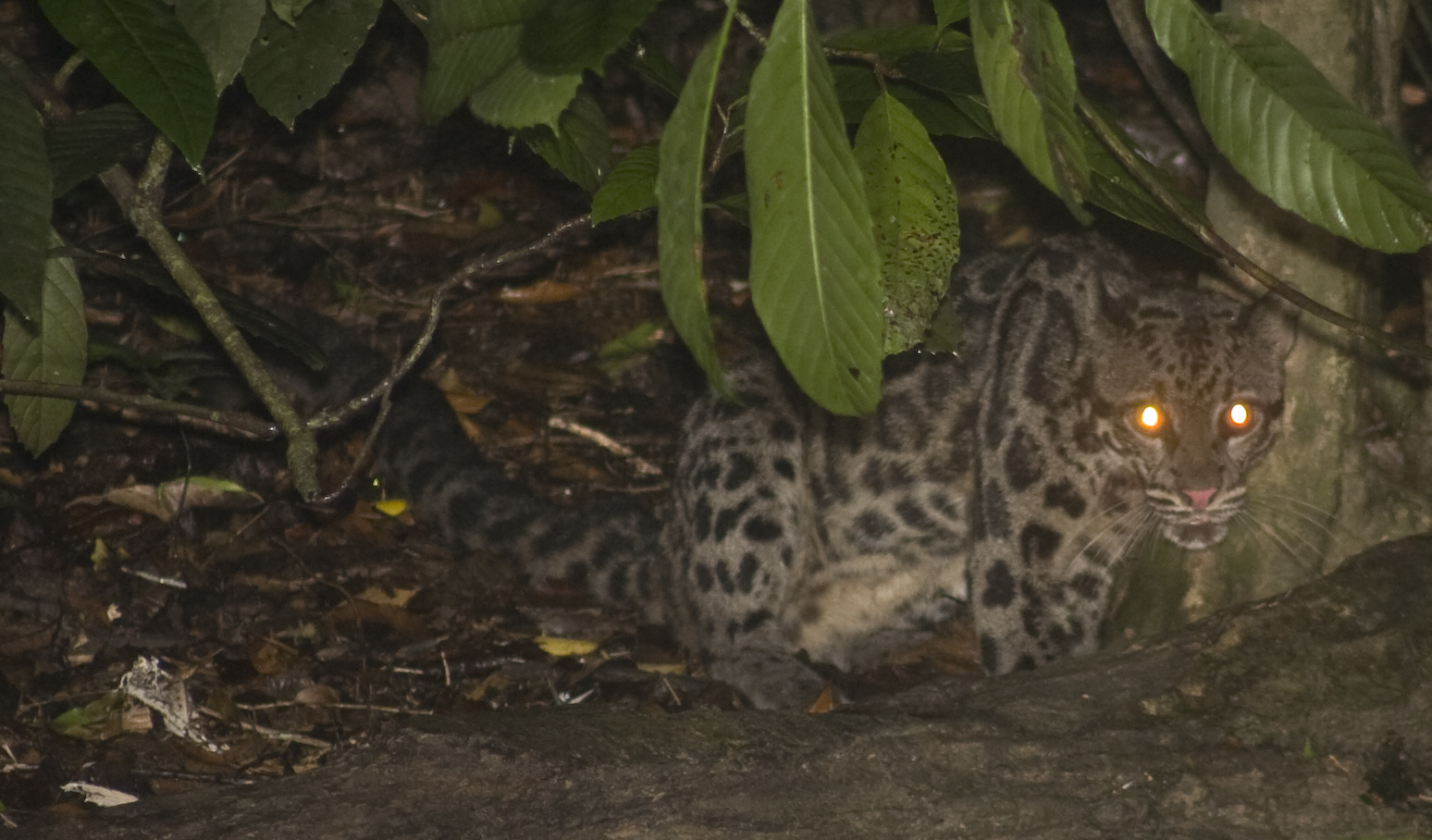
- A Bornean clouded leopard, lower Kinabatangan River, eastern Sabah, Malaysia

Conservation status
- Vulnerable (IUCN 3.1)
- CITES Appendix I

Scientific classification
- Kingdom: Animalia
- Phylum: Chordata
- Class: Mammalia
- Order: Carnivora
- Family: Felidae
- Genus: Neofelis
- Species: N. diardi

Binomial name
- Neofelis diardi (G. Cuvier, 1823)

Subspecies
- N. d. diardi (G. Cuvier, 1823); N. d. borneensis Wilting, Christiansen, Kitchener, Kemp, Ambu and Fickel, 2007
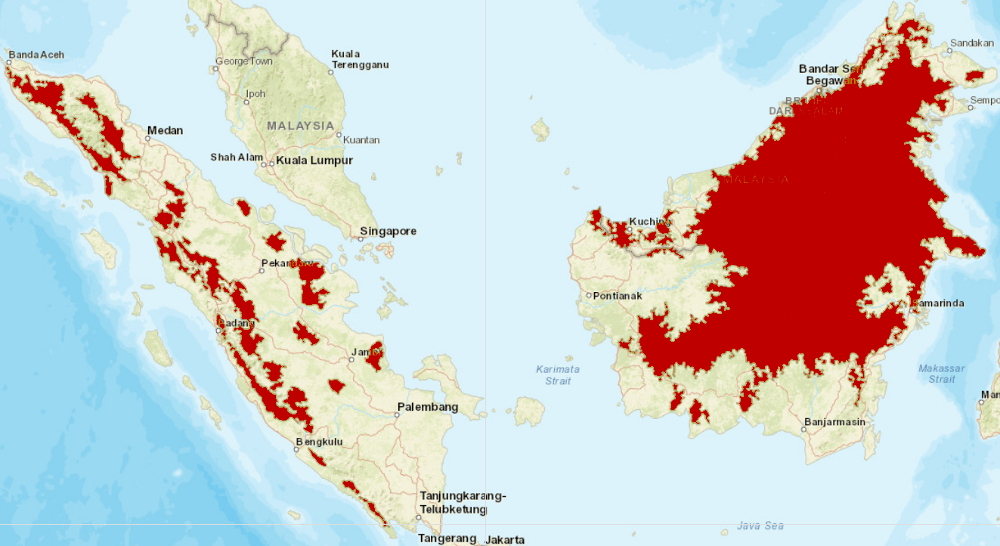
- Distribution of Sunda clouded leopard, 2016

= Sunda clouded leopard =

Sunda clouded leopard Temporal range: Early Pleistocene to recent

Species of carnivore

The Sunda clouded leopard (Neofelis diardi) is a medium-sized wild cat native to Borneo and Sumatra. It is listed as Vulnerable on the IUCN Red List since 2015, as the total effective population probably consists of fewer than 10,000 mature individuals, with a decreasing population trend. On both Sunda Islands, it is threatened by deforestation. It was classified as a separate species, distinct from its close relative, the clouded leopard in mainland Southeast Asia based on a study in 2006. Its fur is darker with a smaller cloud pattern.

This cat is also known as the Sundaland clouded leopard, Enkuli clouded leopard, Diard's clouded leopard, and Diard's cat.

== Characteristics ==
The Sunda clouded leopard is overall grayish yellow or gray hue. It has a double midline on the back and is marked with small irregular cloud-like patterns on shoulders. These cloud markings have frequent spots inside and form two or more rows that are arranged vertically from the back on the flanks. It can purr as its hyoid bone is ossified. Its pupils contract to vertical slits.

It has a stocky build and weighs around 12 to 26 kg (26 to 57 lb). Its canine teeth are 2 in (5.1 cm) long, which, in proportion to the skull length, are longer than those of any other living cat. Its tail can grow to be as long as its body, aiding balance.

== Distribution and habitat ==
The Sunda clouded leopard is restricted to the islands of Borneo and Sumatra. In Borneo, it occurs in lowland rainforest, and at lower density in logged forest below 1,500 m (4,900 ft). In Sumatra, it appears to be more abundant in hilly, montane areas. It is unknown if it still occurs on the Batu Islands close to Sumatra.

Between March and August 2005, tracks of clouded leopards were recorded during field research in the Tabin Wildlife Reserve in Sabah. The population size in the 56 km^{2} (22 sq mi) research area was estimated to be five individuals, based on a capture-recapture analysis of four confirmed animals differentiated by their tracks. The density was estimated at eight to 17 individuals per 100 km^{2} (39 sq mi). The population in Sabah is roughly estimated at 1,500–3,200 individuals, with only 275–585 of them living in totally protected reserves that are large enough to hold a long-term viable population of more than 50 individuals. Density outside protected areas in Sabah is probably much lower, estimated at one individual per 100 km^{2} (39 sq mi).

In Sumatra, it was recorded in Kerinci Seblat, Gunung Leuser and Bukit Barisan Selatan National Parks. It occurs most probably in much lower densities than on Borneo. One explanation for this lower density of about 1.29 individuals per 100 km^{2} (39 sq mi) might be that on Sumatra it is sympatric with the Sumatran tiger, whereas on Borneo it is the largest carnivore.

Clouded leopard fossils were excavated on Java, where it perhaps became extinct in the Holocene.

== Ecology and behaviour ==
The habits of the Sunda clouded leopard are largely unknown because of the animal's secretive nature. It is assumed that it is generally solitary. It hunts mainly on the ground and uses its climbing skills to hide from dangers.

=== Diet ===
The Sunda clouded leopard has been observed feeding on sambar deer, muntjacs, Bornean bearded pigs, mouse deer, porcupines and primates.

== Taxonomy and evolution ==
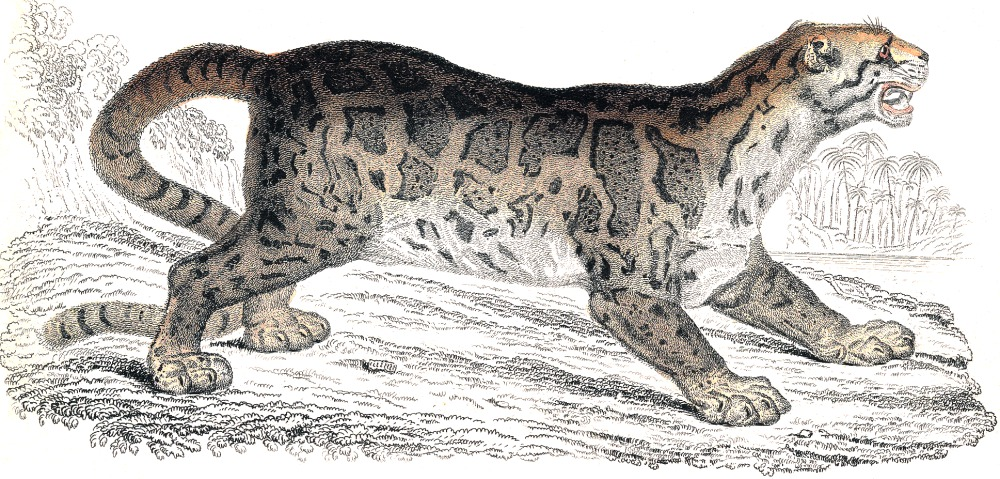
Illustration published 1834 in William Jardine's The Natural History of The Feline

Felis diardi was the scientific name proposed by Georges Cuvier in 1823 in honour of Pierre-Médard Diard, who sent a skin and a drawing from Java to National Museum of Natural History, France. It was subordinated as a clouded leopard subspecies by Reginald Innes Pocock in 1917.

Results of molecular genetic analysis of hair samples from mainland and Sunda clouded leopards showed differences in mtDNA, nuclear DNA sequences, and microsatellite and cytogenetic variation. This indicates that they diverged between 2 and 0.9 million years ago; their last common ancestor probably crossed a now submerged land bridge to reach Borneo and Sumatra. Results of a morphometric analysis of the pelages of 57 clouded leopards sampled throughout the genus' wide geographical range indicated that the two morphological groups differ primarily in the size of their cloud markings. The genus Neofelis was therefore reclassified as comprising two distinct species, N. nebulosa on the mainland and N. diardi in Sumatra and Borneo.

Molecular, craniomandibular, and dental analysis indicates the Sunda clouded leopard has two distinct subspecies with separate evolutionary histories:

- Bornean clouded leopard (N. d. borneensis)
- Sumatran clouded leopard (N. d. diardi)

Both populations are estimated to have diverged during the Middle to Late Pleistocene. This split corresponds roughly with the catastrophic super-eruption of the Toba Volcano in Sumatra 69,000–77,000 years ago. A probable scenario is that Sunda clouded leopards from Borneo recolonized Sumatra during periods of low sea levels in the Pleistocene, and were later separated from their source population by rising sea levels.

== Threats ==
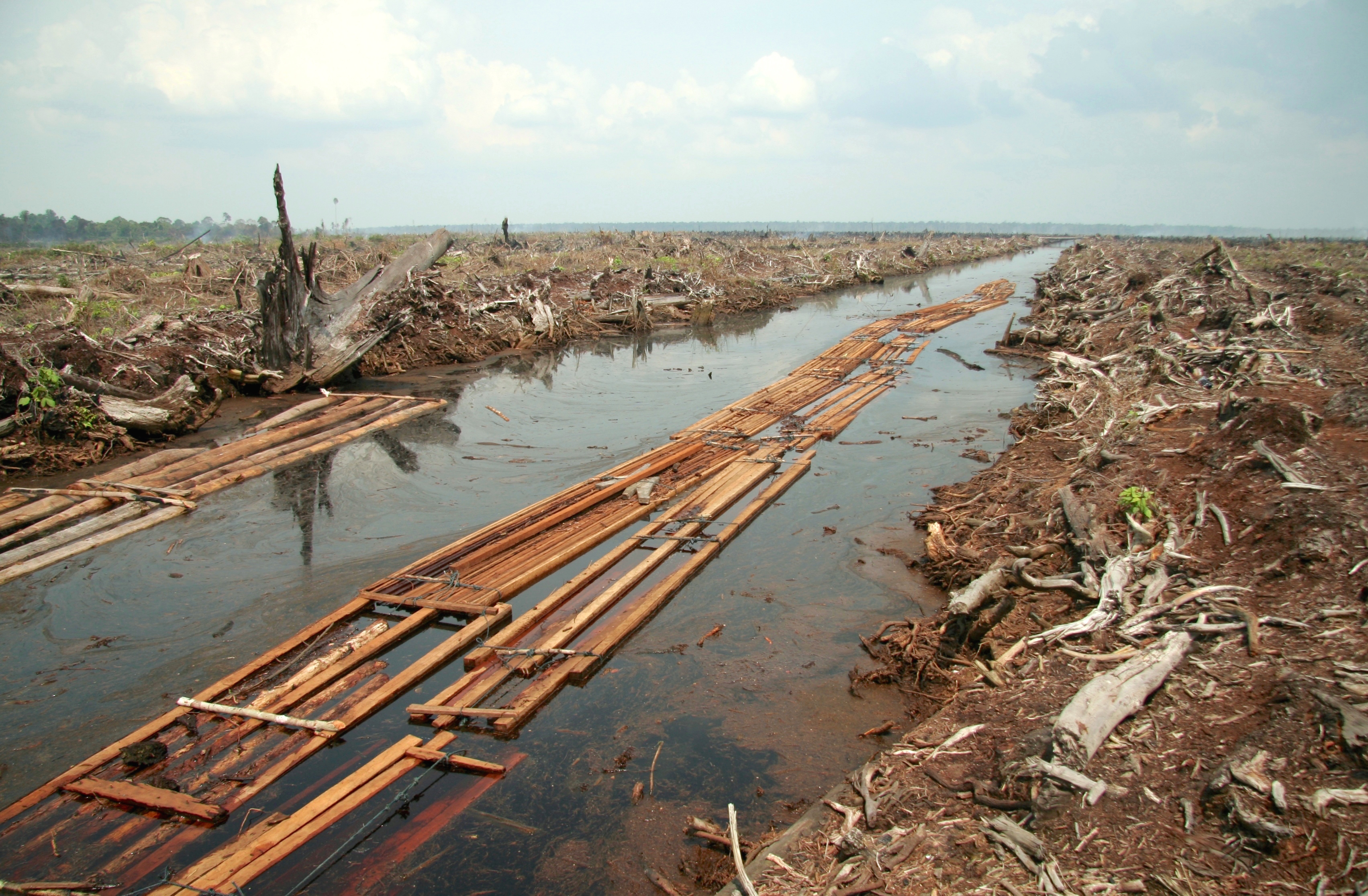
Deforestation in Sumatra

As the Sunda clouded leopard is strongly arboreal and forest-dependent, it is increasingly threatened by habitat destruction following deforestation in Indonesia and in Malaysia.

Since the early 1970s, much of the forest cover has been cleared in southern Sumatra, in particular lowland tropical evergreen forest. Fragmentation of forest stands and agricultural encroachments have rendered wildlife particularly vulnerable to human pressure. Borneo has one of the world's highest deforestation rates. While in the mid-1980s forests still covered nearly three quarters of the island, by 2005 only 52% of Borneo was still forested. Both forests and land make way for human settlement. Illegal trade in wildlife is a widely spread practice.

The population status of Sunda clouded leopards in Sumatra and Borneo has been estimated to decrease due to forest loss, forest conversion, illegal logging, encroachment, and possibly hunting. In Borneo, forest fires pose an additional threat, particularly in Kalimantan and in Sebangau National Park.

There have been reports of poaching of Sunda clouded leopards in Brunei's Belait District where locals are selling their pelts at a lucrative price.

In Indonesia, the Sunda clouded leopard is threatened by illegal hunting and trade. Between 2011 and 2019, body parts of 32 individuals were seized including 17 live individuals, six skins, several canines and claws. One live individual seized in Jakarta had been ordered by a Kuwaiti buyer.

== Conservation ==
Neofelis diardi is listed on CITES Appendix I, and is fully protected in Sumatra, Kalimantan, Sabah, Sarawak and Brunei. Sunda clouded leopards occur in most protected areas along the Sumatran mountain spine and in most protected areas on Borneo.

Since November 2006, the Bornean Wild Cat and Clouded Leopard Project based in the Danum Valley Conservation Area and the Tabin Wildlife Reserve aims to study the behaviour and ecology of the five species of Bornean wild cat — bay cat, flat-headed cat, marbled cat, leopard cat, and Sunda clouded leopard — and their prey, with a focus on the clouded leopard; investigate the effects of habitat alteration; increase awareness of the Bornean wild cats and their conservation needs, using the clouded leopard as a flagship species; and investigate threats to the Bornean wild cats from hunting and trade in Sabah.

The Sunda clouded leopard is one of the focal cats of the project Conservation of Carnivores in Sabah based in northeastern Borneo since July 2008. The project team evaluates the consequences of different forms of forest exploitation for the abundance and density of felids in three commercially used forest reserves. They intend to assess the conservation needs of these felids and develop species specific conservation action plans together with other researchers and all local stakeholders.

== Names ==
The scientific name of the genus Neofelis is a composite of the Greek word νεο- meaning "new, fresh, strange", and the Latin word feles meaning "cat", so it literally means "new cat."

The Indonesian name for the clouded leopard rimau-dahan means "tree tiger" or "branch tiger". In Sarawak, it is known as entulu.

== See also ==
- Carnivorans discovered in the 2000s
- Sunda Islands
- List of largest cats
