= Kinabatangan River =

River in Sabah, Malaysia

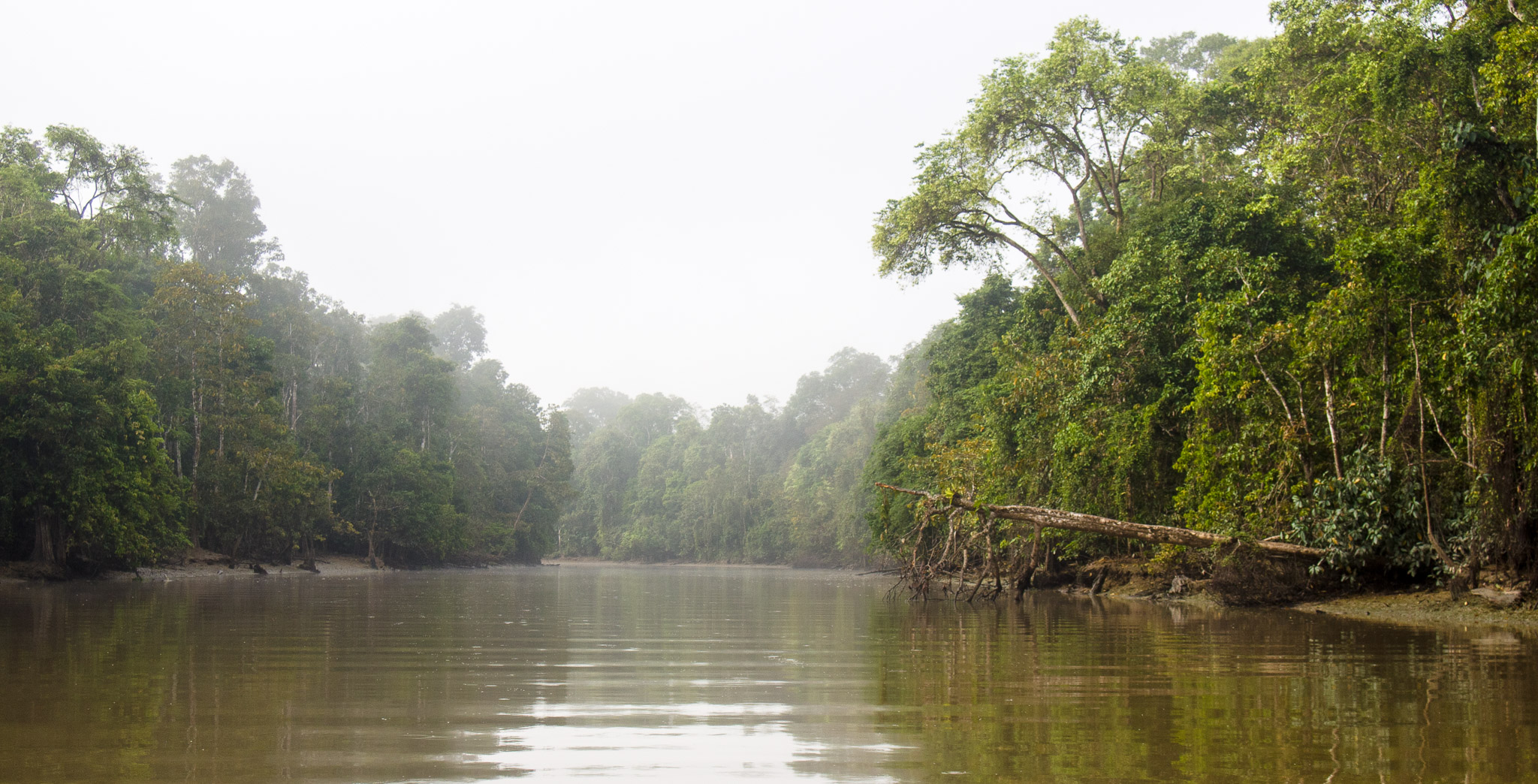
- A view of the Kinabatangan River

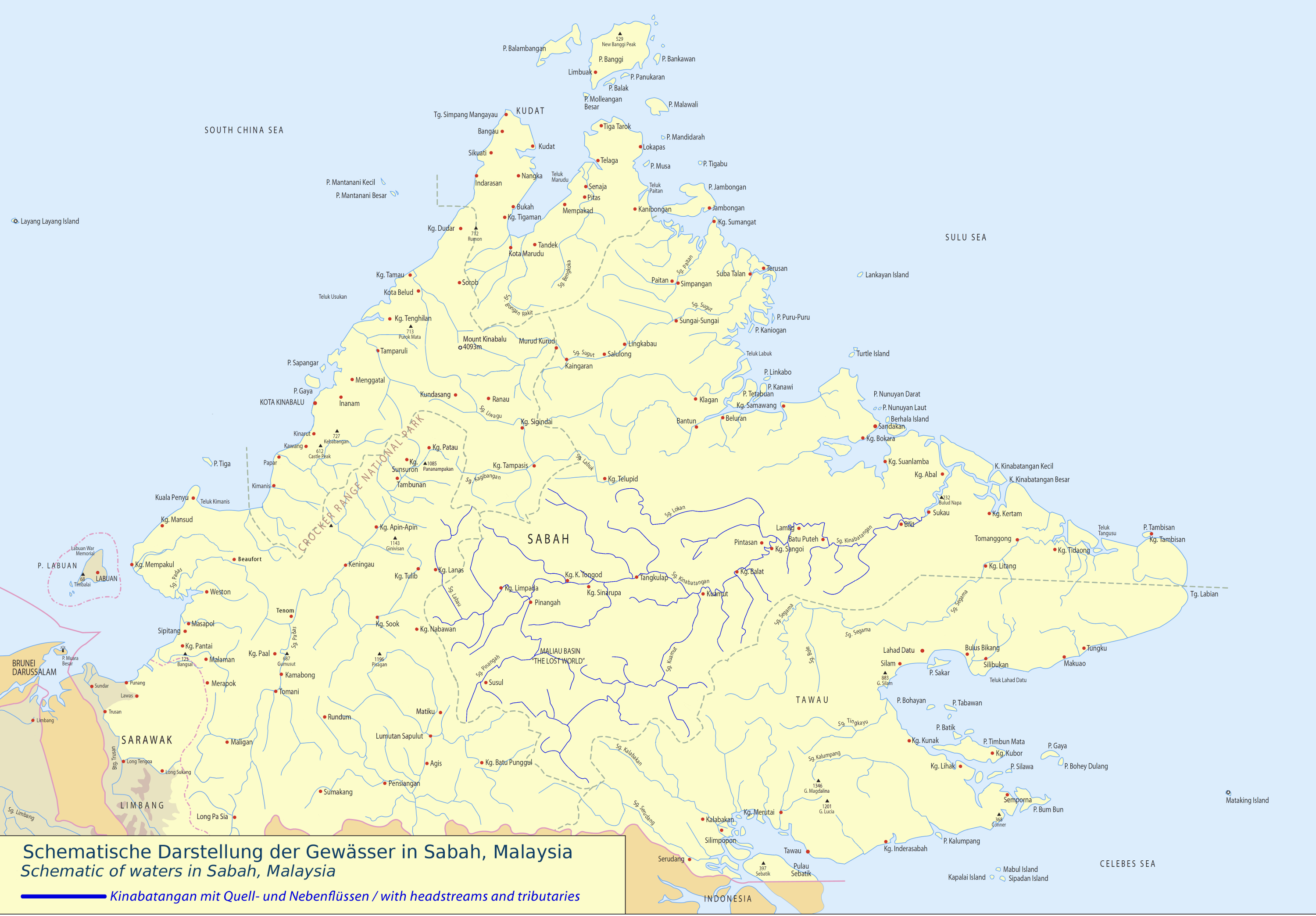
- The river source and tributaries are in dark blue.
- Native name: Sungai Kinabatangan (Malay)

Location
- Country: Malaysia
- State: Sabah
- Division: Sandakan Division
- Precise location: Northeastern Borneo

Physical characteristics
- Source
  - location: From mountains in Tongod District
- Mouth
  - location: At Kinabatangan District into Sulu Sea
  - coordinates: 5°37′34.1″N 118°34′21.4″E
  - elevation: Sea level
- Length: 563 km (350 mi)
- Basin size: 16,795.5 km^{2} (6,484.8 mi^{2})
- Discharge
  - location: Kinabatangan Delta
  - average: 840 m^{3}/s (30,000 cu ft/s)

Basin features
- Progression: Sulu Sea
- River system: Kinabatangan River
- Tributaries
  - left: Tongod, Karamuk, Tangkulap Besar, Lokan
  - right: Pinangah, Imbak, Bangan, Kuamut, Koyah, Tenegang Besar

The Kinabatangan River (Malay: Sungai Kinabatangan) is a river in Sandakan Division, in eastern Sabah, Malaysia. It is the second longest river in Malaysia, with a length of 560 km (350 miles) from its headwaters in the mountains of southwest Sabah to its outlet at the Sulu Sea, east of Sandakan. (Note: Kinabatangan River with 560 km (350 miles) length is the second longest river in Malaysia after the 563 km (350 miles) Rajang River in neighbouring Sarawak.) The area is known for its high biodiversity, including its limestone caves at Gomantong Hill, dryland dipterocarp forests, riverine forest, freshwater swamp forest, oxbow lakes, and salty mangrove swamps near the coast.

== Tributaries ==
The main tributaries from the mouth:

Left tributary	Right tributary	Length (km)	Basin size (km^{2})	Average discharge (m^{3}/s)
Kinabatangan		563	16,795.5	840
Melanking			212.3	14.1
	Tenegang Besar		700.2	38.1
	Koyah		409.1	22.3
	Pin		247.5	14.6
	Lamag		229.3	14.2
Lokan		150	1,522.9	122.3
Tabalin Besar			176.1	12
	Malua		288	15.7
	Malubuk		286.9	15.2
	Kuamut	180	3,164.7	138.1
	Bangan		354	20.7
Tangkulap Besar			326.1	22.9
Karamuk		90	726.3	46.3
	Sinoa		178.3	10
	Imbak	70	462	23.5
Tongod		60	661.6	32.7
	Pinangah	130	1,289.1	54.7
	Melikop		356	14.8
Pingas			262	11.1

== Etymology and history ==
With the early Chinese traders' settlement around the river mouth area, the name Kina Batañgan was used by the indigenous people of the area for the river, with the word Kina being a reference by the indigenous Dusun for the Chinese people. The Orang Sungai traditionally lived along the river banks and were of mixed ancestry, including Dusun, Suluk, Bugis, Bajau as well the Chinese. The earliest Chinese traders settlement on the banks of the Kinabatangan River had been established since the 7th century, where they traded in edible-nest swiftlet, beeswax, rattan and ivory. In the 15th century, a sister of the Chinese Kinabatangan settlement leader married the sultan of Brunei. During the British North Borneo era, the river served as the route for goods and timber exports, navigable for steam launches as well for smaller boats. William Burgess Pryer attempted to establish a market at one location called Domingol along the river coast, but the plan did not flourish.

== Geology and ecology ==
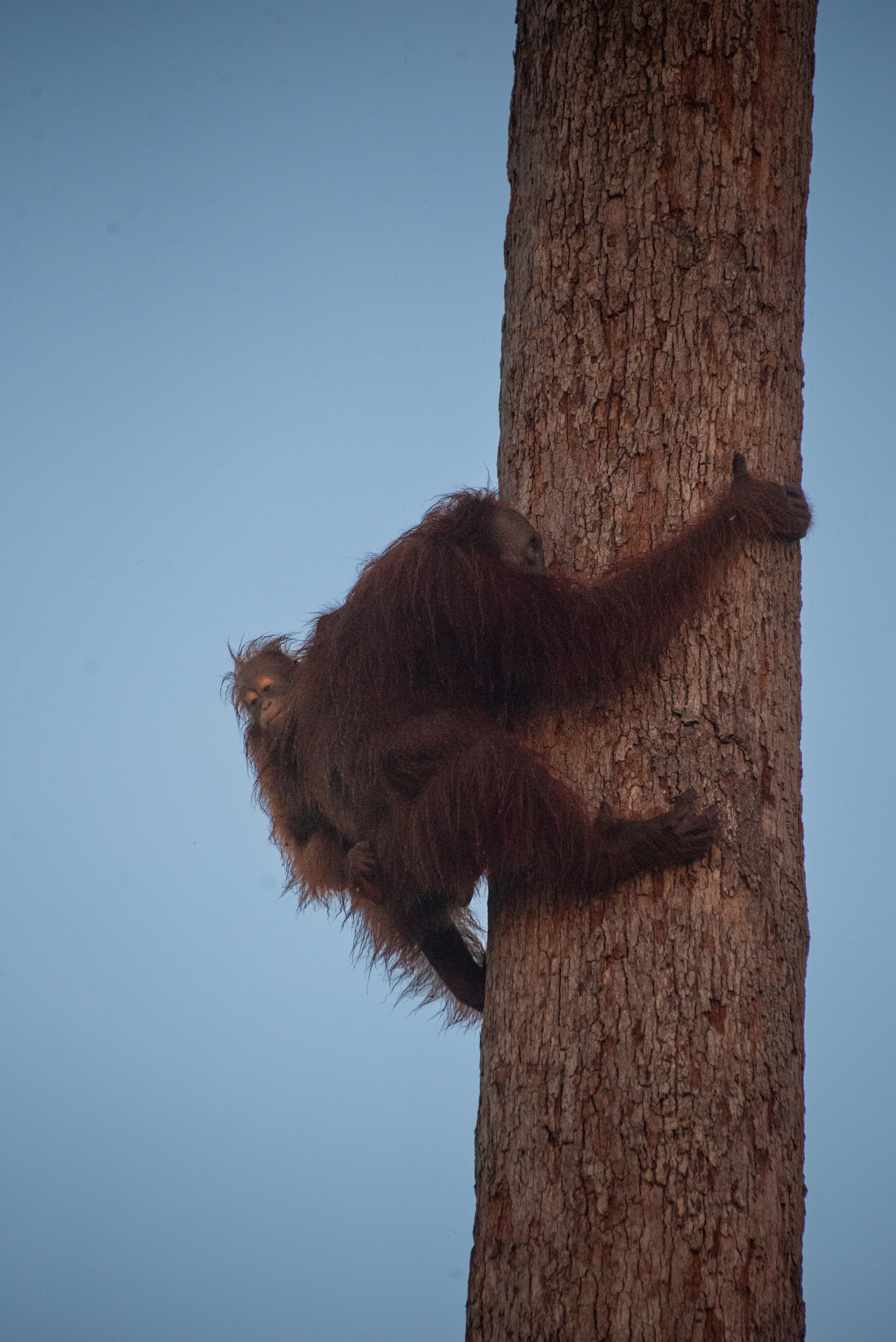
Female Bornean orangutan with offspring at the Kinabatangan river.

The river area, including Labang and Kuamut, were formed by the Early and Middle Miocene periods, while large parts of the river system from the Maliau Basin were formed during the Early and Late Miocene. Towards the river mouth, the area is made of Middle Miocene chaotic deposits. The ecology of the upper reaches of the river has been severely disrupted by excessive logging and clearing of land for plantations, although the original lowland forest and mangrove swamps near the coast have largely survived, providing sanctuary for a population of saltwater crocodiles (Crocodylus porosus) and containing some of Borneo's highest concentrations of wildlife.

Bornean orangutans, proboscis monkeys, Borneo elephants and Sunda clouded leopards are some of the most remarkable mammals that can be found along the river. There are also many bird species, such as the family of hornbills: black hornbill, wrinkled hornbill, white-crowned hornbill, rhinoceros hornbill, and oriental pied hornbill.

The endemic Ganges shark (Glyphis fowlerae) is found in the lower reaches.

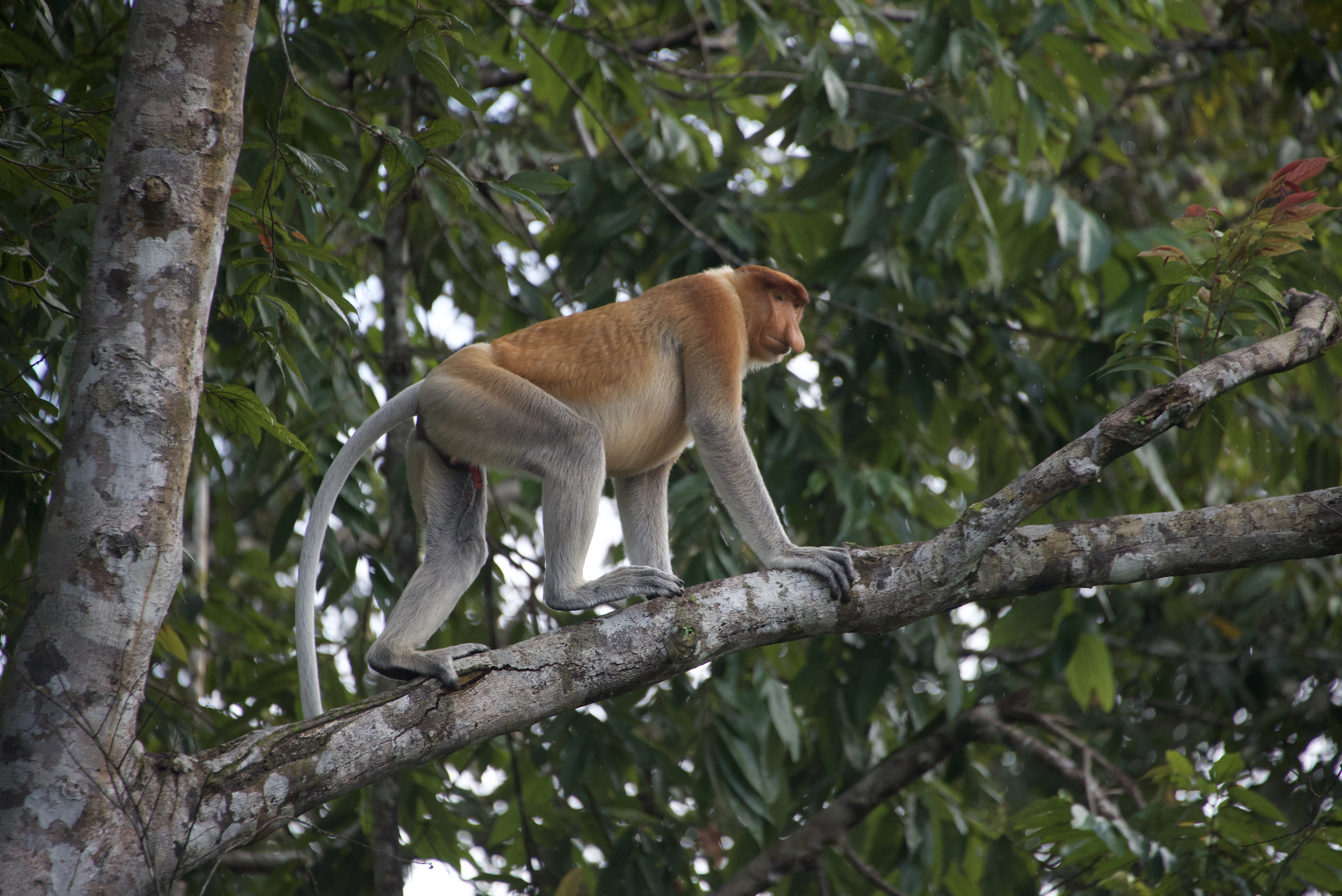
Adult proboscis monkey at the river

In many villages along the river, the demand for freshwater fish has always been high, and the livelihoods of villagers have greatly depended on the income from catches. Each year, the lashing rains of the northeast monsoon cause the river to swell rapidly. Unable to disgorge into the sea quickly enough, the river frequently overflows its banks and spreads across the flat land of its lower reaches, creating a huge floodplain.

== Conservation efforts ==
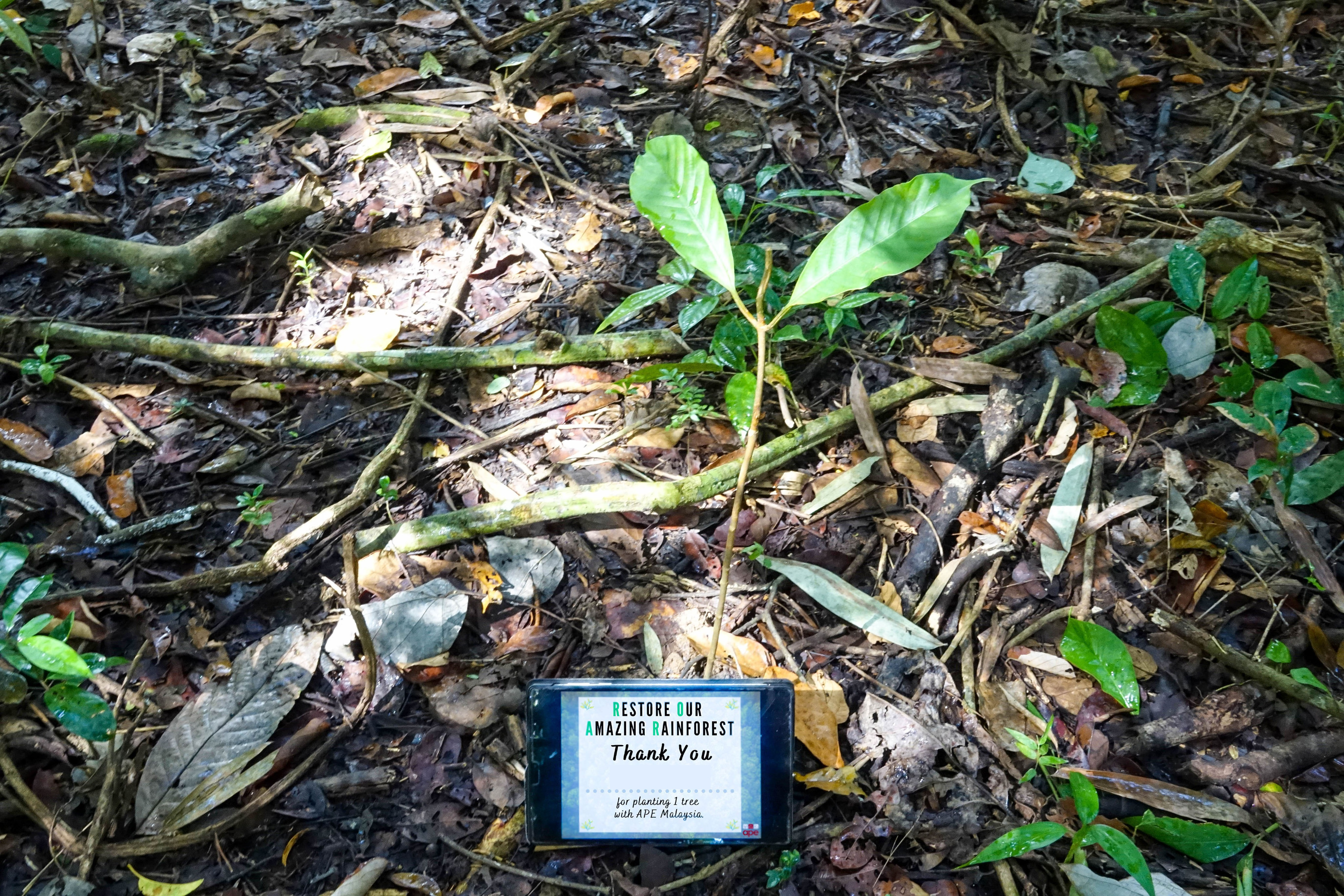
A sapling planted by APE Malaysia at the Lower Kinabatangan Wildlife Sanctuary, Sabah, Malaysia

In 1997, 270 km^{2} (104 sq mi) of the lower Kinabatangan floodplain were declared a protected area. Much of the deeper river area is protected under the Lower Kinabatangan Sanctuary, a 28,000-hectare (69,190-acre) reserve established in 1999 that provides a variety of habitats for flora, especially a freshwater swamp forest, mangroves, palms, and bamboo, as well as fauna, such as Hose's langurs, proboscis monkeys, orangutans, pig-tailed macaques, gibbons, slow lorises, elephants, Sunda clouded leopards, and rhinoceros. In 2001, the lower Kinabatangan floodplain was upgraded into a bird sanctuary area through the efforts of non-governmental organisations (NGOs). Following media attention after a decapitated elephant's head was found floating down the river in 2006, the protected area was gazetted as the Kinabatangan Wildlife Sanctuary through the Sabah Wildlife Conservation Enactment of 1997 under the purview of the Sabah Wildlife Department in 2009.

Since the beginning of the modern era in the early 1950s until 1987, the lower Kinabatangan area has been subjected to commercial logging activities, and more than 60,000 hectares (148,263 acres) of its lowland rainforest have been developed into cocoa and palm oil plantations. This resulted in severe pollution of the river, which greatly affected the lives of villagers who had depended on the river for their livelihoods, attracting the attention of the Ministry of Tourism, Culture and Environment of the government of Sabah. In 2011, Nestlé launched a reforestation project of the riparian area along the Kinabatangan River in Sukau to create a landscape where people, nature, and agriculture activities could co-exist harmoniously in their need for water. Most nature tourism in the Kinabatangan River area is concentrated around Sukau since it is accessible by road and offers comfortable accommodation to visitors prepared to pay for well-managed tours.

== Accessibility ==
The only bridge crossing the river is located at Federal Route Federal Route 13, about 108 km (67 mi) from Sandakan. A 350 m (1,150 ft) bridge linking Sukau with Litang and Tommanggong was planned but cancelled in April 2017 after opposition from conservationists, including David Attenborough, due to potential adverse effect on the local pygmy elephant population. The river can be visited all year round, although it is often flooded during the wettest part of the year in December and January. From April to October during the main flowering and fruiting season, the climate is generally fairly dry and a good time to spot many birds and animals. During the northeast monsoon from November to March, there are often heavy showers during the afternoons which usually extended until December and January. Through the rainy season, it is possible to negotiate many of the river channels leading into the oxbow lakes, where there is a greater concentration of wildlife.

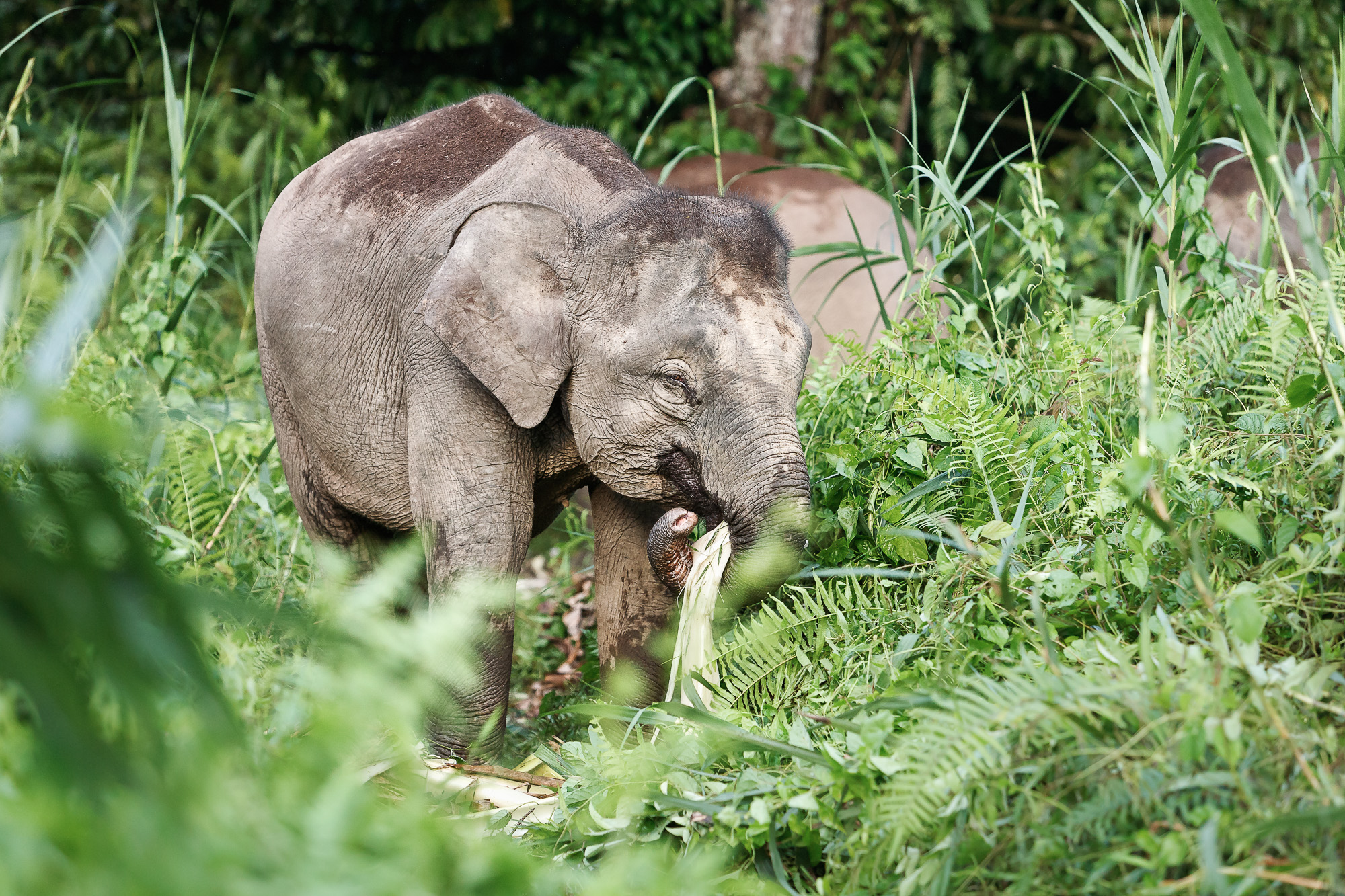
A Bornean pygmy elephant feeding near a farmer's field along the river

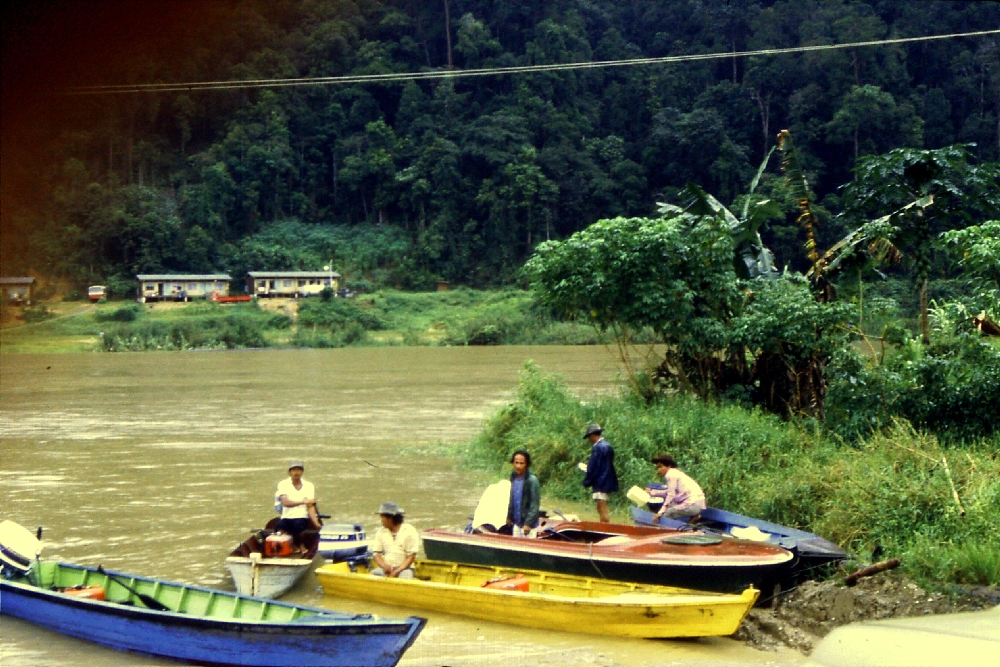
The river in 1984

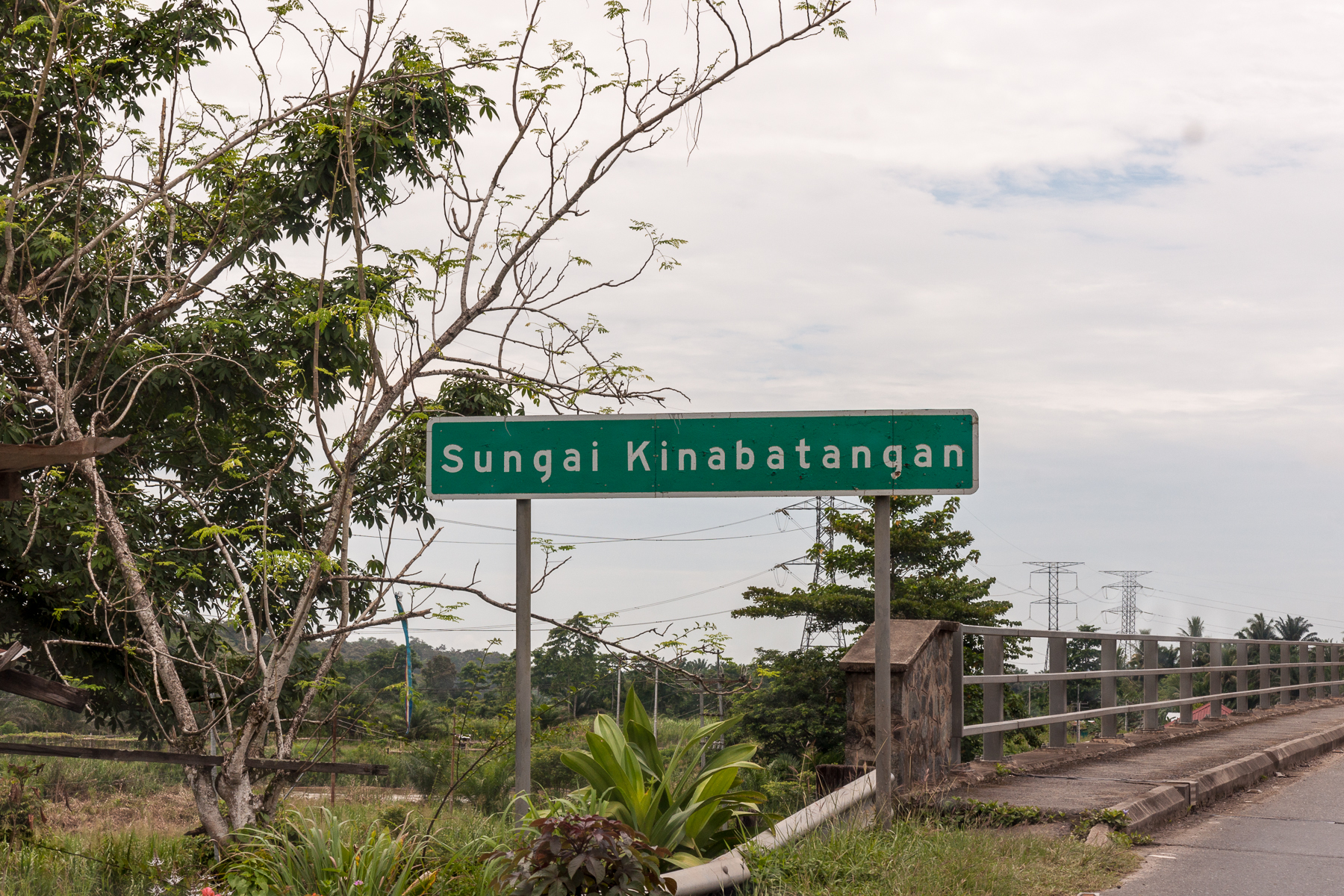
A signboard on a road bridge passing the river

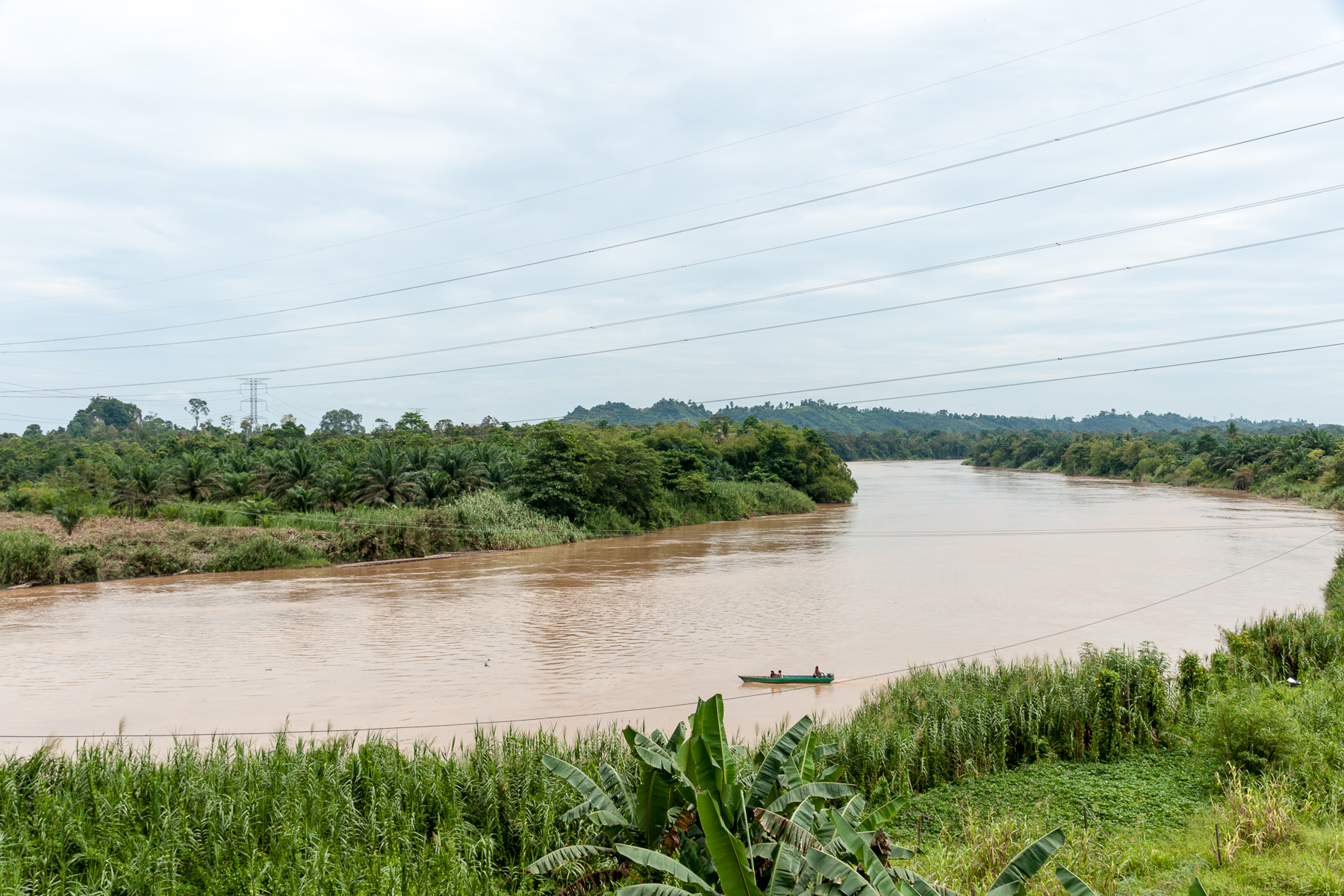
The river seen from afar

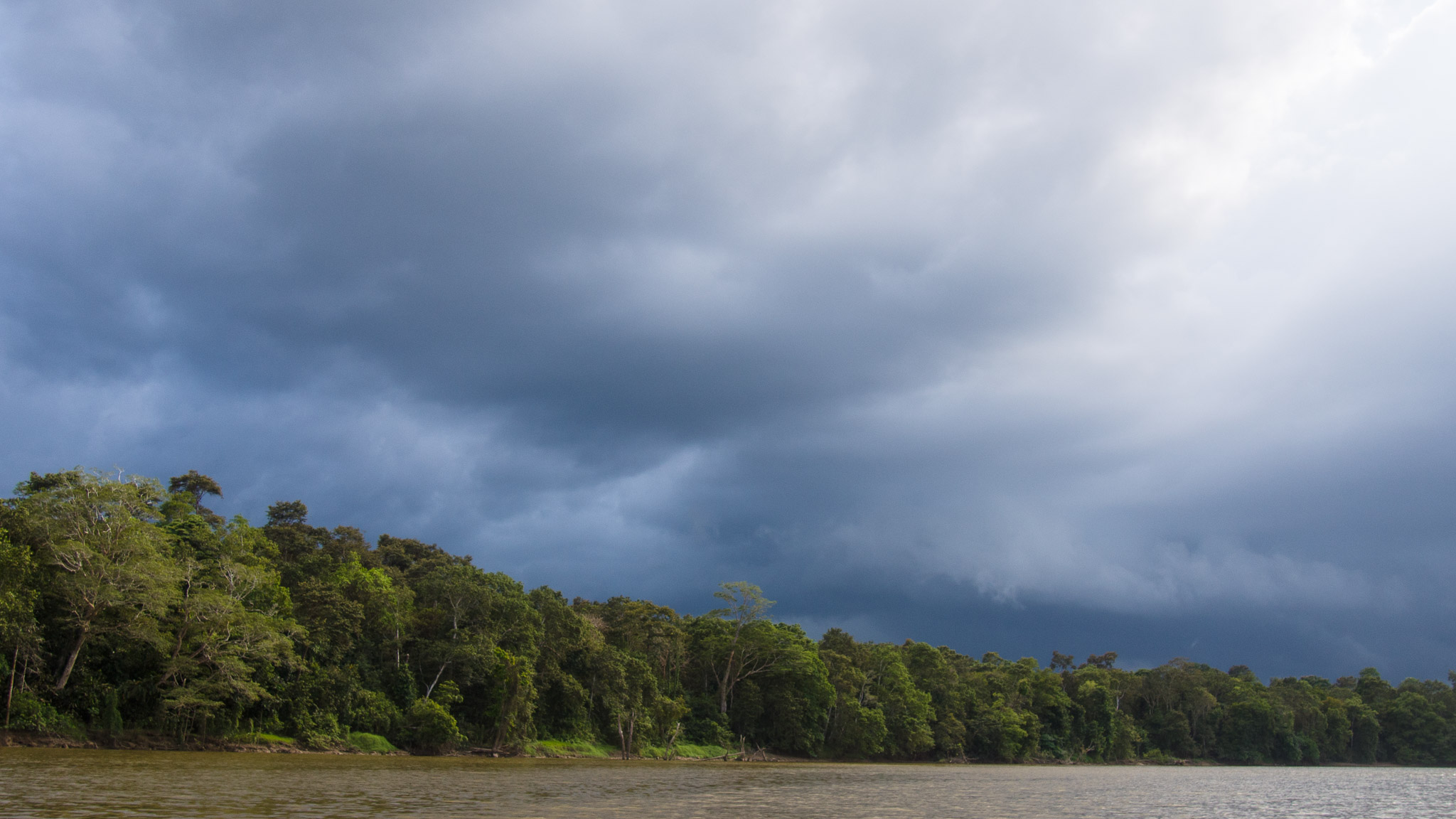
Vegetation along the river

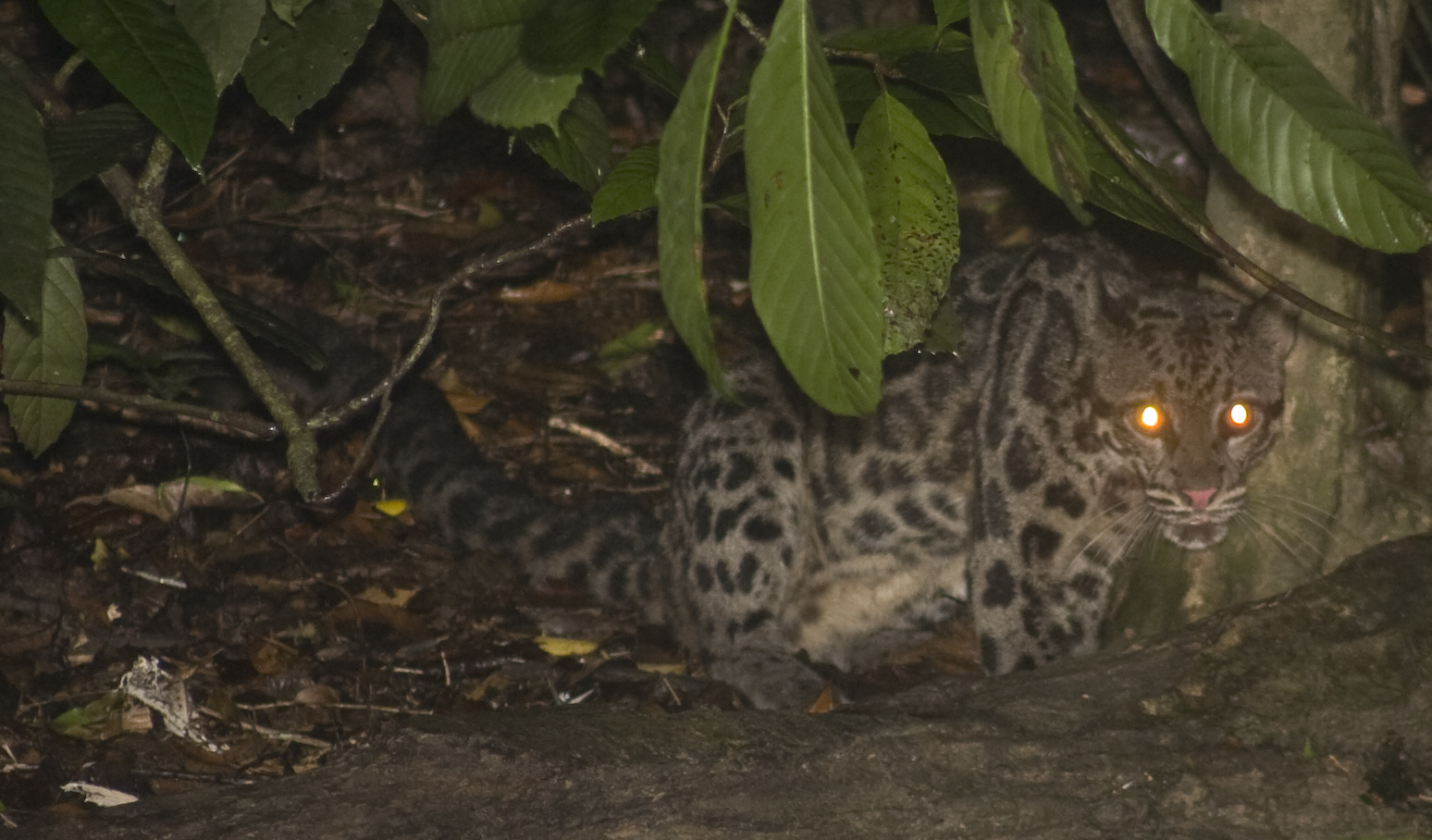
Bornean clouded leopard along the lower part of the river

== See also ==
- List of rivers of Malaysia
