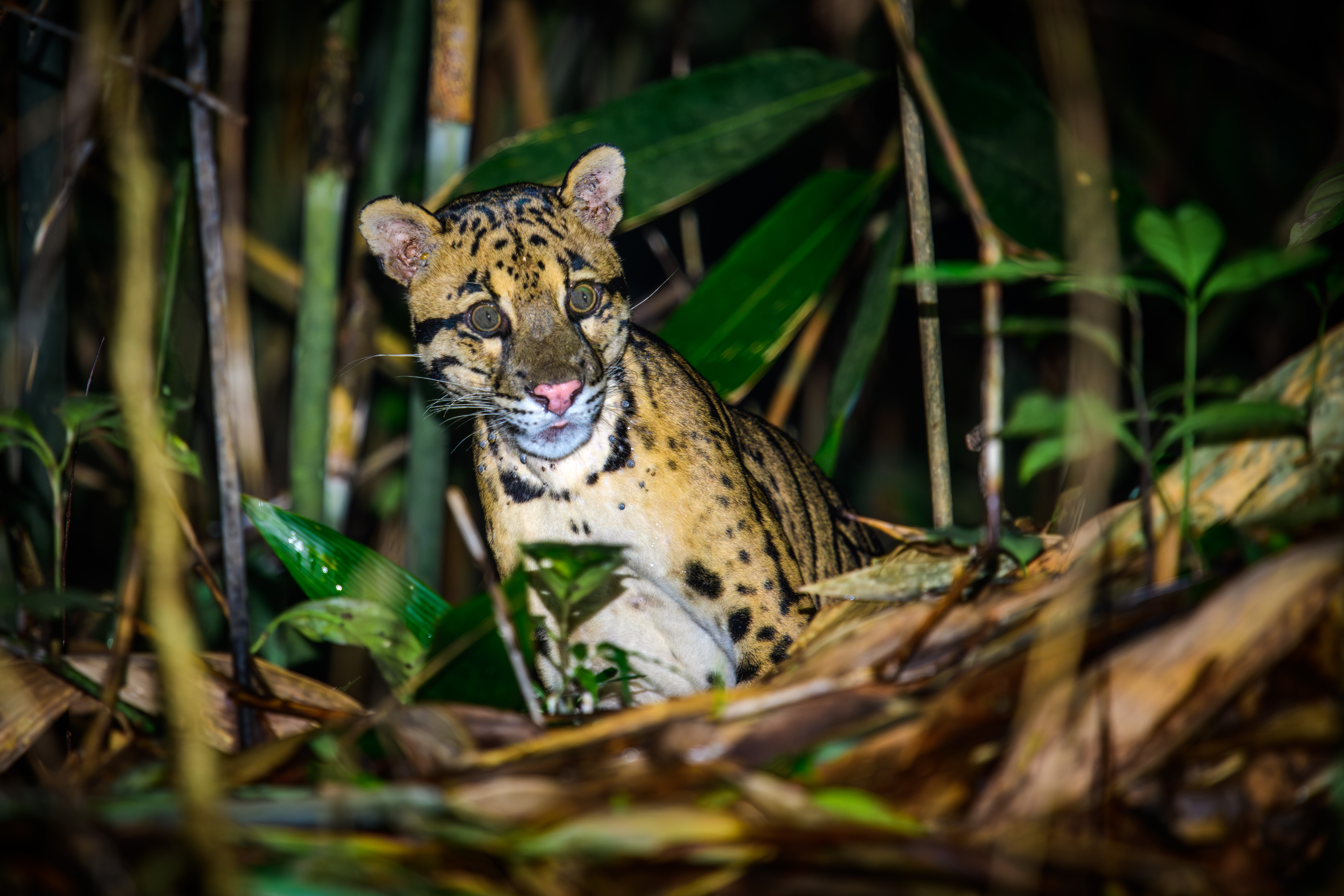
- Clouded leopard in Kaeng Krachan National Park

Conservation status
- Vulnerable (IUCN 3.1)
- CITES Appendix I

Scientific classification
- Kingdom: Animalia
- Phylum: Chordata
- Class: Mammalia
- Order: Carnivora
- Family: Felidae
- Genus: Neofelis
- Species: N. nebulosa

Binomial name
- Neofelis nebulosa (Griffith, 1821)
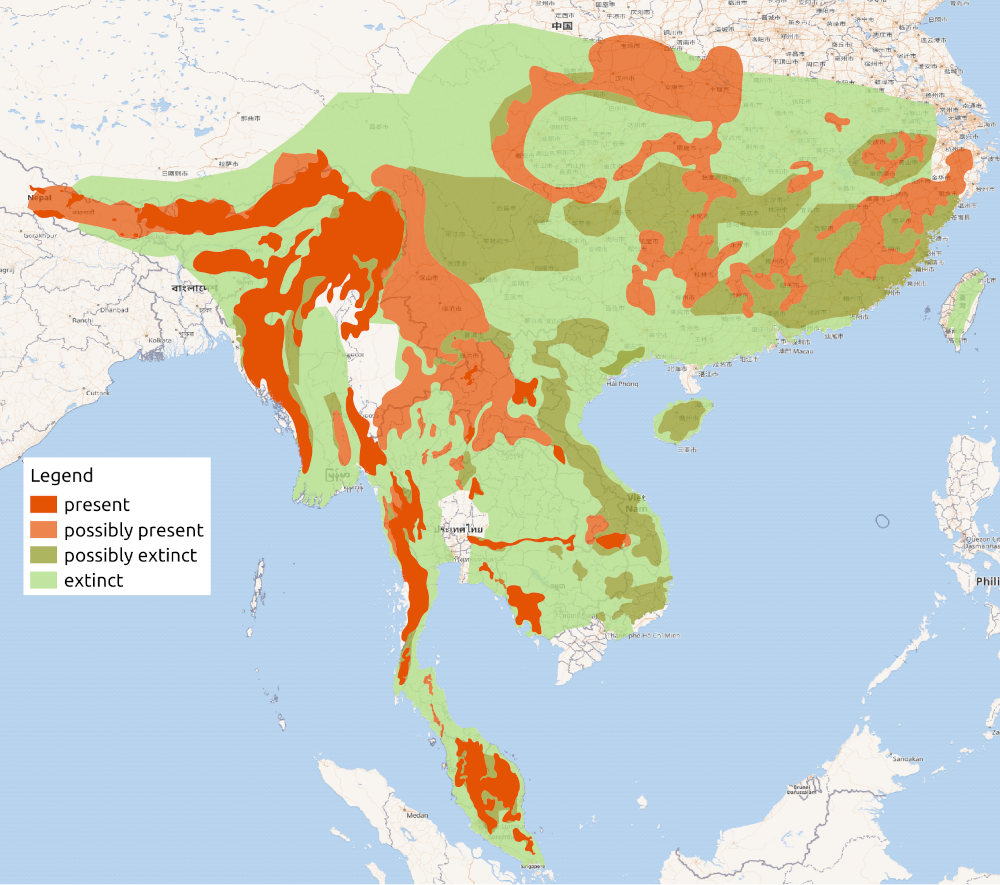
- Distribution of the clouded leopard

= Clouded leopard =

Species of wild cat

The clouded leopard (Neofelis nebulosa), also called mainland clouded leopard, is a wild cat that has large dusky-grey blotches and irregular spots and stripes reminiscent of clouds. Its head-and-body length ranges from 68.6 to 108 cm (27.0 to 42.5 in) with a 61 to 91 cm (24 to 36 in) long tail, which it uses for balancing when moving in trees.

The clouded leopard was first described in 1821 on the basis of a skin of an individual from China. It is the sister taxon to other pantherine cats, having genetically diverged 9.32 to 4.47 million years ago. It inhabits dense forests from the foothills of the Himalayas through Northeast India and Bhutan to mainland Southeast Asia into South China. It can climb down vertical tree trunks head first, rests in trees during the day and hunts by night on the forest floor.

The wild population is thought to be in decline, with fewer than 10,000 adults and no more than 1,000 in any subpopulation. It is locally extinct in Singapore, Taiwan, and possibly also in Hainan Island and Vietnam. It has therefore been listed as Vulnerable on the IUCN Red List since 2008. The population is threatened by large-scale deforestation and commercial poaching for the wildlife trade. Its body parts are offered for decoration and clothing, though it is legally protected in most range countries.

The clouded leopard has been kept in zoological gardens since the early 20th century. Captive breeding programs were initiated in the 1980s. In captivity, the clouded leopard has an average lifespan of 11 years.

== Taxonomy and phylogeny ==
Felis nebulosa was proposed by Edward Griffith in 1821 who first described the skin of a clouded leopard that was brought alive from Guangdong in China to the menagerie at Exeter Exchange in London. Felis macrosceloides proposed by Brian Houghton Hodgson in 1841 was a clouded leopard specimen from Nepal. Felis brachyura proposed by Robert Swinhoe in 1862 was a clouded leopard skin from Taiwan. The generic name Neofelis was proposed by John Edward Gray in 1867 who subordinated all three to this genus. Currently, N. nebulosa is considered a monotypic species due to lack of evidence for subspeciation.

Felis diardi proposed by Georges Cuvier in 1823 was based on a clouded leopard skin from Java. It was considered a clouded leopard subspecies by Reginald Innes Pocock in 1917. In 2006, it was identified as a distinct Neofelis species, the Sunda clouded leopard. Populations in Taiwan and Hainan Island are considered to belong to the mainland clouded leopard.

=== Phylogeny ===
Skulls of clouded leopard and Panthera species were analysed morphologically in the 1960s. Results indicate that the clouded leopard forms an evolutionary link between the Pantherinae and the Felinae. Phylogenetic analysis of the nuclear DNA in tissue samples from all Felidae species revealed that the evolutionary radiation of the Felidae began in the Miocene around 14.45 to 8.38 million years ago in Asia. Analysis of mitochondrial DNA of all Felidae species indicates a radiation at 16.76 to 6.46 million years ago. The clouded leopard is the sister taxon to all other members of the Pantherinae, diverging 9.32 to 4.47 million years ago, based on analysis of their nuclear DNA. The clouded leopard from mainland Asia reached Borneo and Sumatra via a now submerged land bridge probably during the Pleistocene, when populations became isolated during periods of global cooling and warming. Genetic analysis of hair samples of the clouded leopard and its sister species the Sunda clouded leopard (N. diardi) indicates that they diverged 2.0–0.93 million years ago.

Phylogenetic relationships of the clouded leopard as derived through analysis of

nuclear DNA:

- Felidae
  - Felinae
  - Pantherinae
    - Panthera
    - Clouded leopard

combined mitochondrial and nuclear DNA:

- Felidae
  - Felinae
  - Pantherinae
    - Panthera
    - Neofelis
      - Sunda clouded leopard
      - Mainland clouded leopard

== Characteristics ==
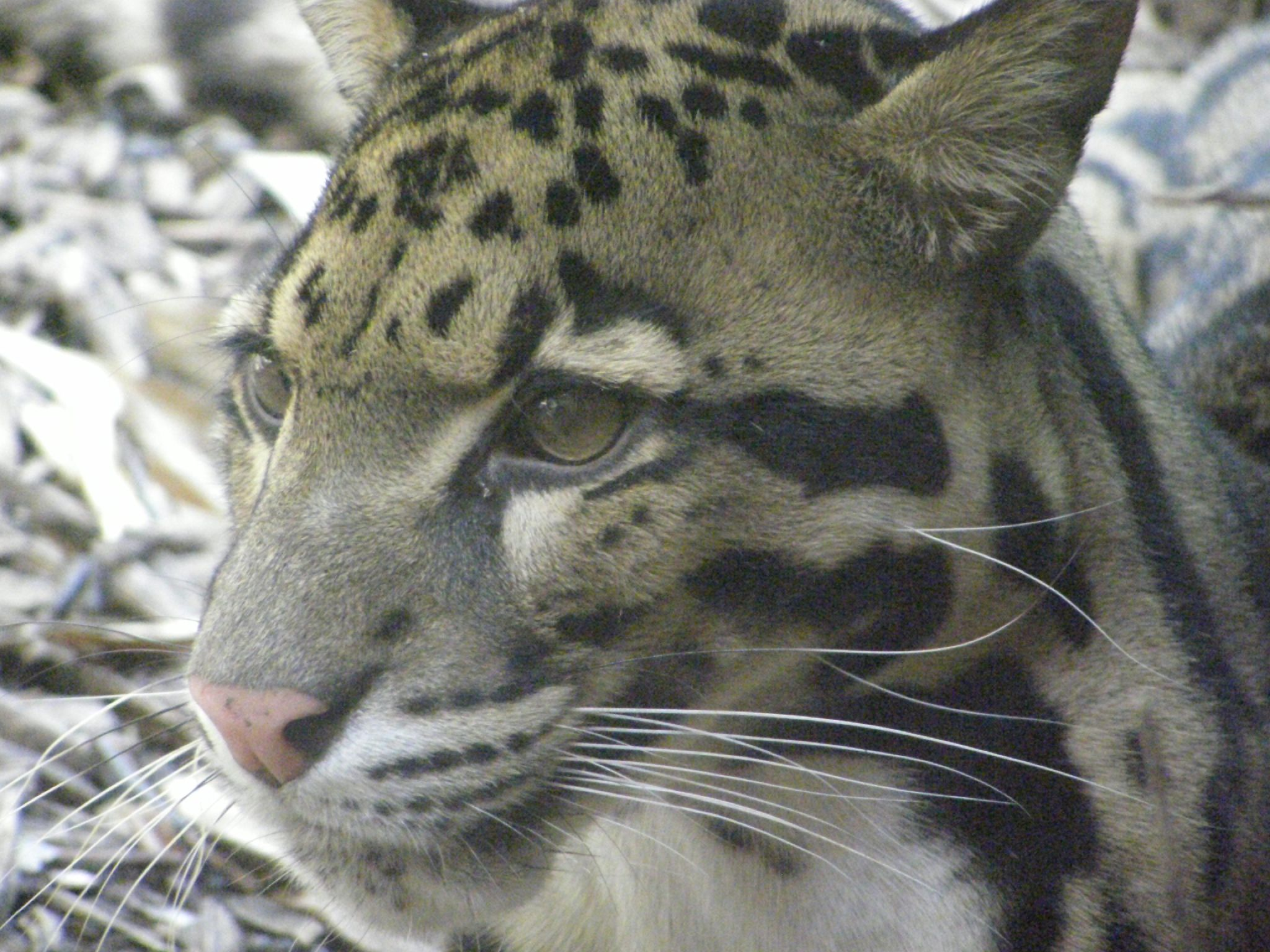
Face

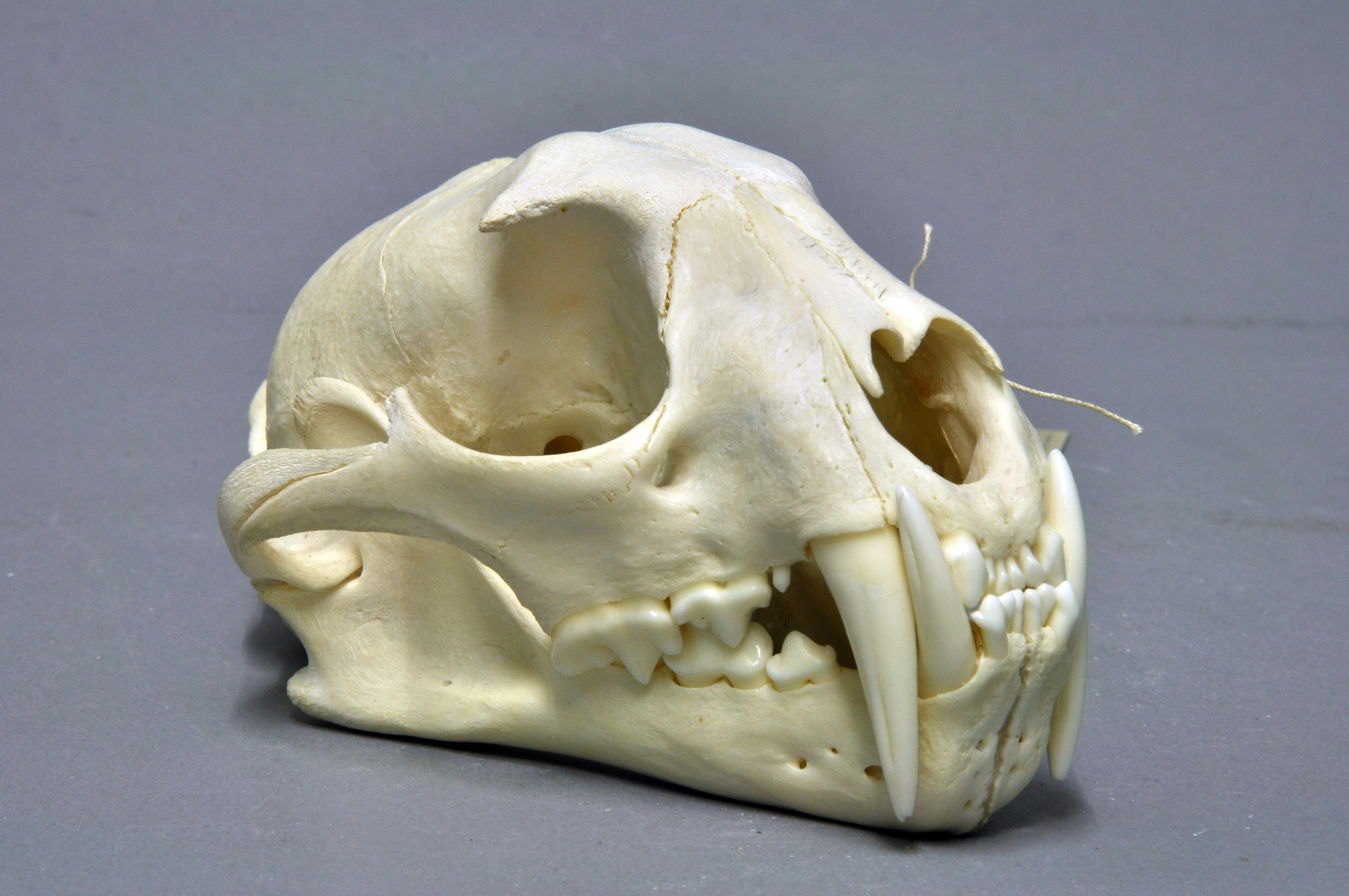
Skull

The clouded leopard's fur is of a dark grey or ochreous ground-color, often largely obliterated by black and dark dusky-grey blotched pattern. There are black spots on the head, and the ears are black. Partly fused or broken-up stripes run from the corner of the eyes over the cheek, from the corner of the mouth to the neck, and along the nape to the shoulders. Elongated blotches continue down the spine and form a single median stripe on the loins. Two large blotches of dark dusky-grey hair on the side of the shoulders are each emphasized posteriorly by a dark stripe, which passes on to the foreleg and breaks up into irregular spots. The flanks are marked by dark dusky-grey irregular blotches bordered behind by long, oblique, irregularly curved or looped stripes, which are the reason for the English name. The underparts and legs are spotted, and the tail is marked by large, irregular, paired spots. Its legs are short and stout, and its paws are broad. Females are slightly smaller than males.

Its hyoid bone is ossified, making it possible to purr. Its pupils contract into vertical slits. Irises are brownish yellow to grayish green. Melanistic clouded leopards are uncommon. It has rather short limbs compared to the other big cats. Its hind limbs are longer than its front limbs to allow for increased jumping and leaping capabilities. Its ulnae and radii are not fused, which also contributes to a greater range of motion when climbing trees and stalking prey. Clouded leopards weigh between 11.5 and 23 kg (25 and 51 lb). Females vary in head-to-body length from 68.6 to 94 cm (27.0 to 37.0 in), with a tail 61 to 82 cm (24 to 32 in) long. Males are larger at 81 to 108 cm (32 to 43 in) with a tail 74 to 91 cm (29 to 36 in) long. Its shoulder height varies from 50 to 55 cm (20 to 22 in).

Its skull is long and low with strong occipital and sagittal crests. The canine teeth are exceptionally long, the upper being about three times as long as the basal width of the socket. The first premolar is usually absent. The upper pair of canines measure 4 cm (1.6 in) or longer. It has a bite force at the canine tip of 544.3 Newton and a bite force quotient at the canine tip of 122.4. The clouded leopard is often referred to as a "modern-day sabre-tooth" because it has the largest canines in proportion to its body size.

== Distribution and habitat ==
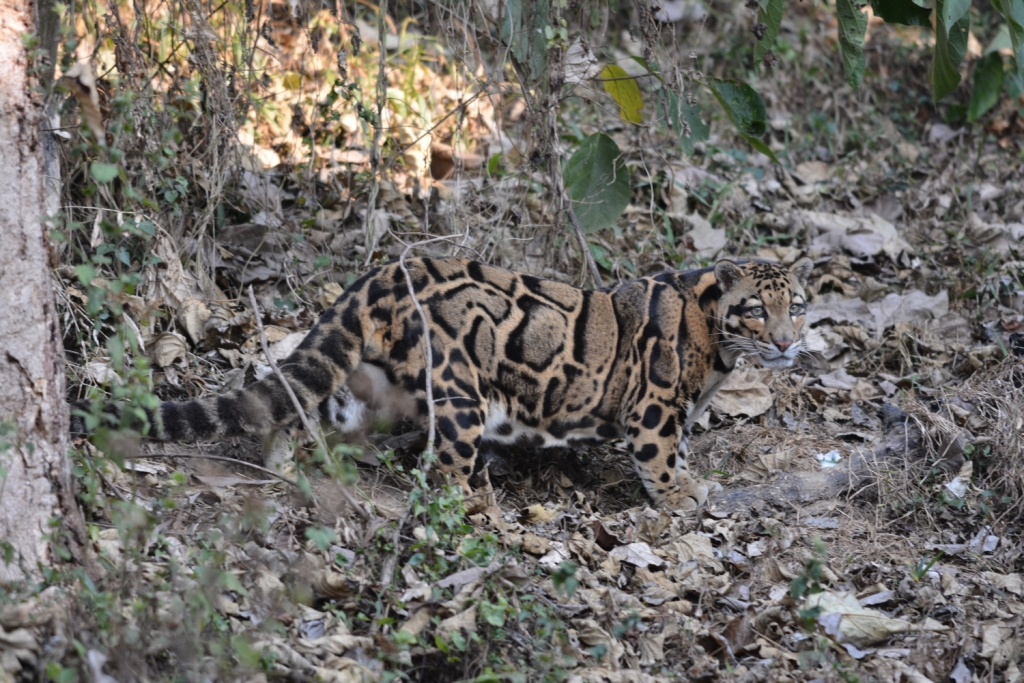
Clouded leopard at Aizawl, Mizoram, India

The clouded leopard occurs from the Himalayan foothills in Nepal, Bhutan and India to Myanmar, southeastern Bangladesh, Thailand, Peninsular Malaysia and to south of the Yangtze River in China. It is locally extinct in Singapore and Taiwan.

Clouded leopards were found in Nepal in 1987 and 1988, having previously been presumed to be extinct in the country. Since then, the clouded leopard has been recorded in Shivapuri Nagarjun National Park and in Annapurna Conservation Area. Between 2014 and 2015, it was also recorded in Langtang National Park at an elevation range of 1,823–3,498 m (5,981–11,476 ft).

In India, it occurs in the states of Sikkim, northern West Bengal, Tripura, Mizoram, Manipur, Assam, Nagaland and Arunachal Pradesh, as well as in the Meghalaya subtropical forests. In Pakke Tiger Reserve, a clouded leopard was photographed in semi-evergreen forest at an elevation of 144 m (472 ft). In Sikkim, clouded leopards were photographed by camera traps at elevations of 2,500–3,720 m (8,200–12,200 ft) between April 2008 and May 2010 in the Khangchendzonga Biosphere Reserve. In Manas National Park, 16 individuals were recorded during a survey in November 2010 to February 2011. Between January 2013 and March 2018, clouded leopards were also recorded in Dampa Tiger Reserve, Eaglenest Wildlife Sanctuary and Singchung-Bugun Village Community Reserve, in Meghalaya's Nongkhyllem Wildlife Sanctuary and Balpakram-Baghmara landscape.

In Bhutan, it was recorded in Royal Manas National Park, Jigme Singye Wangchuck National Park, Phibsoo Wildlife Sanctuary, Jigme Dorji National Park, Phrumsengla National Park, Bumdeling Wildlife Sanctuary and several non-protected areas. In Bangladesh, it was recorded in Sangu Matamuhari in the Chittagong Hill Tracts in 2016. In Myanmar, it was recorded by camera traps for the first time in the hill forests of Karen State in 2015.

In Thailand, it inhabits relatively open, dry tropical forest in Huai Kha Khaeng Wildlife Sanctuary and closed-forest habitats in Khao Yai National Park. In Laos, it was recorded in Nam Et-Phou Louey National Protected Area in dry evergreen and semi-evergreen forests. In Cambodia, it was recorded in deciduous dipterocarp forest in Phnom Prich Wildlife Sanctuary between 2008 and 2009, and in Central Cardamom Mountains National Park, Southern Cardamom National Park, Botum Sakor National Park and Phnom Samkos Wildlife Sanctuary between 2012 and 2016. In Peninsular Malaysia, it was recorded in Taman Negara National Park, Ulu Muda Forest, Pasoh Forest Reserve, Belum-Temengor, Temengor Forest Reserve and in a few linkages between 2009 and 2015.

The last confirmed record of a Formosan clouded leopard dates to 1989, when the skin of a young individual was found in the Taroko National Park. It was not recorded during an extensive camera trapping survey conducted from 1997 to 2012 in more than 1,450 sites inside and outside Taiwanese protected areas.

== Behaviour and ecology ==
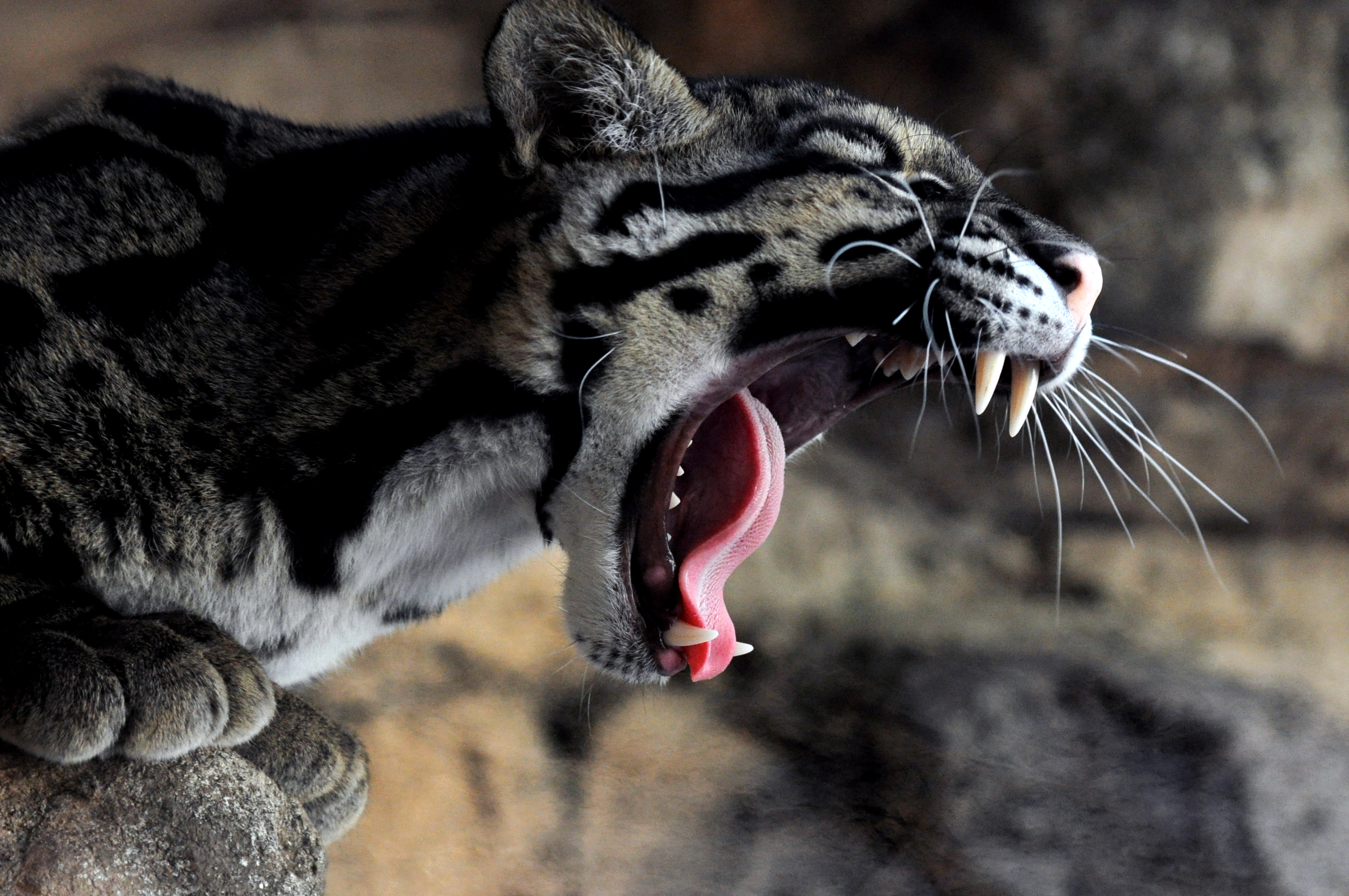
In the San Antonio Zoo

The clouded leopard is a solitary cat. Early accounts depict it as a rare, secretive, arboreal, and nocturnal inhabitant of dense primary forest. It is one of the most talented climbers among the cats. Captive clouded leopards have been observed climbing down vertical tree trunks head first, and hang on to branches with their hind paws bent around branchings of tree limbs. They are capable of supination and can hang down from branches only by bending their hind paws and their tail around them. They jump over 1.2 m (3 ft 11 in) high. They use trees as daytime rest sites, but also spend time on the ground when hunting at night. Captive clouded leopards have been observed scent marking by spraying urine and rubbing their heads on prominent objects. Their vocalisations include a short high-pitched meow call, a loud crying call, both emitted when a cat is trying to locate another one over a long or short distance; they prusten and raise their muzzle when meeting each other in a friendly manner; when aggressive, they growl with a low-pitched sound and hiss with exposed teeth and wrinkled nose.

Radio-collared clouded leopards were foremost active by night but also showed crepuscular activity peaks. Clouded leopards recorded in northeast India were most active in the late evening after sunset.

Home ranges have only been estimated in Thailand:

- Four individuals were radio-collared in Phu Khieo Wildlife Sanctuary from April 2000 to February 2003. Home ranges of two females were 25.7 km^{2} (9.9 sq mi) and 22.9 km^{2} (8.8 sq mi), and of two males 29.7 km^{2} (11.5 sq mi) and 49.1 km^{2} (19.0 sq mi).
- Two individuals were radio-collared during a study from 1997 to 1999 in the Khao Yai National Park. The home range of one female was 39.4 km^{2} (15.2 sq mi), of the one male 42 km^{2} (16 sq mi). Both individuals had a core area of 2.9 km^{2} (1.1 sq mi).

In 2016, clouded leopards were detected in the forest complex of Khlong Saeng Wildlife Sanctuary and Khao Sok National Park during camera trapping surveys; 15 individuals were identified in a core zone of 200 km^{2} (77 sq mi) with population density estimated at 5.06 individuals per 100 km^{2} (39 sq mi); but only 12 individuals were identified in an edge zone of 297 km^{2} (115 sq mi), which is more disturbed by humans, with density estimated at 3.13 individuals per 100 km^{2} (39 sq mi).

=== Hunting and diet ===
When hunting, the clouded leopard stalks its prey or waits for the prey to approach. After making and feeding on a kill, it usually retreats into trees to digest and rest. Its prey includes both arboreal and terrestrial vertebrates. Pocock presumed that it is adapted for preying upon herbivorous mammals of considerable bulk because of its powerful build, long canines and the deep penetration of its bites. In Thailand, clouded leopards have been observed preying on southern pig-tailed macaque (Macaca nemestrina), Indian hog deer (Axis porcinus), Asiatic brush-tailed porcupine (Atherurus macrourus), Malayan pangolin (Manis javanica) and Berdmore's ground squirrel (Menetes berdmorei). In India, a clouded leopard also preyed on a Bengal slow loris (Nycticebus bengalensis). Known prey species in China include barking deer (Muntiacus sp.) and pheasants. In northern Peninsular Malaysia, a male clouded leopard was photographed while carrying a binturong (Arctictis binturong) in its jaws.

=== Reproduction and life cycle ===
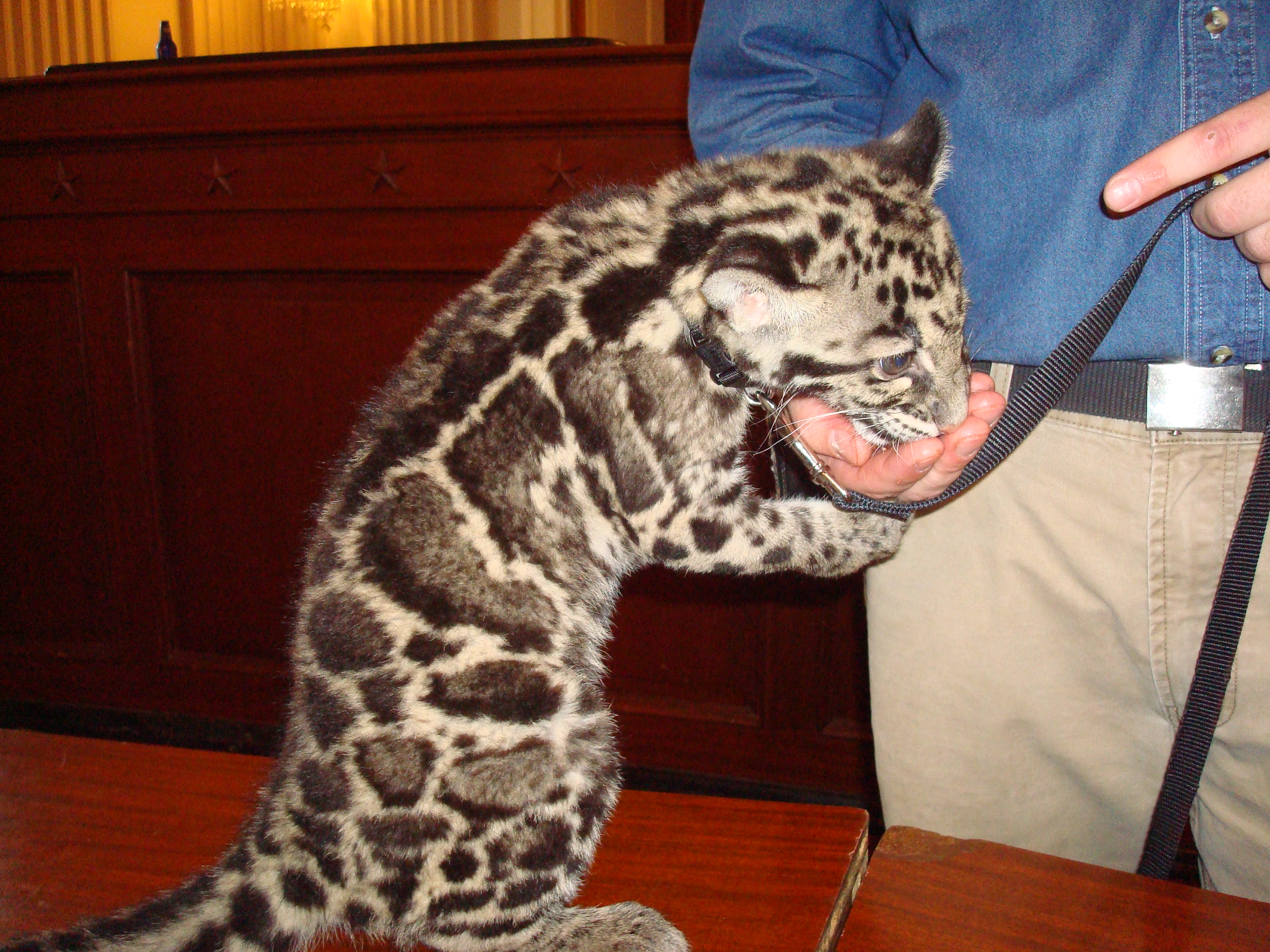
Clouded leopard cub

Both males and females average 26 months at first reproduction. The female is in estrus for about six days, with her estrous cycle lasting about 30 days. In the wild, mating usually occurs between December and March. The pair mates multiple times over the course of several days. The male grasps the female by the neck who responds with vocalization. Occasionally, he also bites her during courtship and is very aggressive during sexual encounters. Females can bear one litter each year. The male is not involved in raising the cubs.

The female gives birth to a litter of one to five, mostly three cubs, after a gestation period of 93 ± 6 days. Cubs are born with closed eyes and weigh from 140 to 280 g (4.9 to 9.9 oz). Their spots are solid dark, rather than dark rings. Their eyes open after about 10 days. They are active within five weeks and fully weaned at around three months of age. They attain the adult coat pattern at around six months and become independent after around 10 months.

Captive clouded leopards have an average lifespan of 11 years. One individual has lived to be almost 17 years old.

The generation length of the clouded leopard is about seven years.

== Threats ==
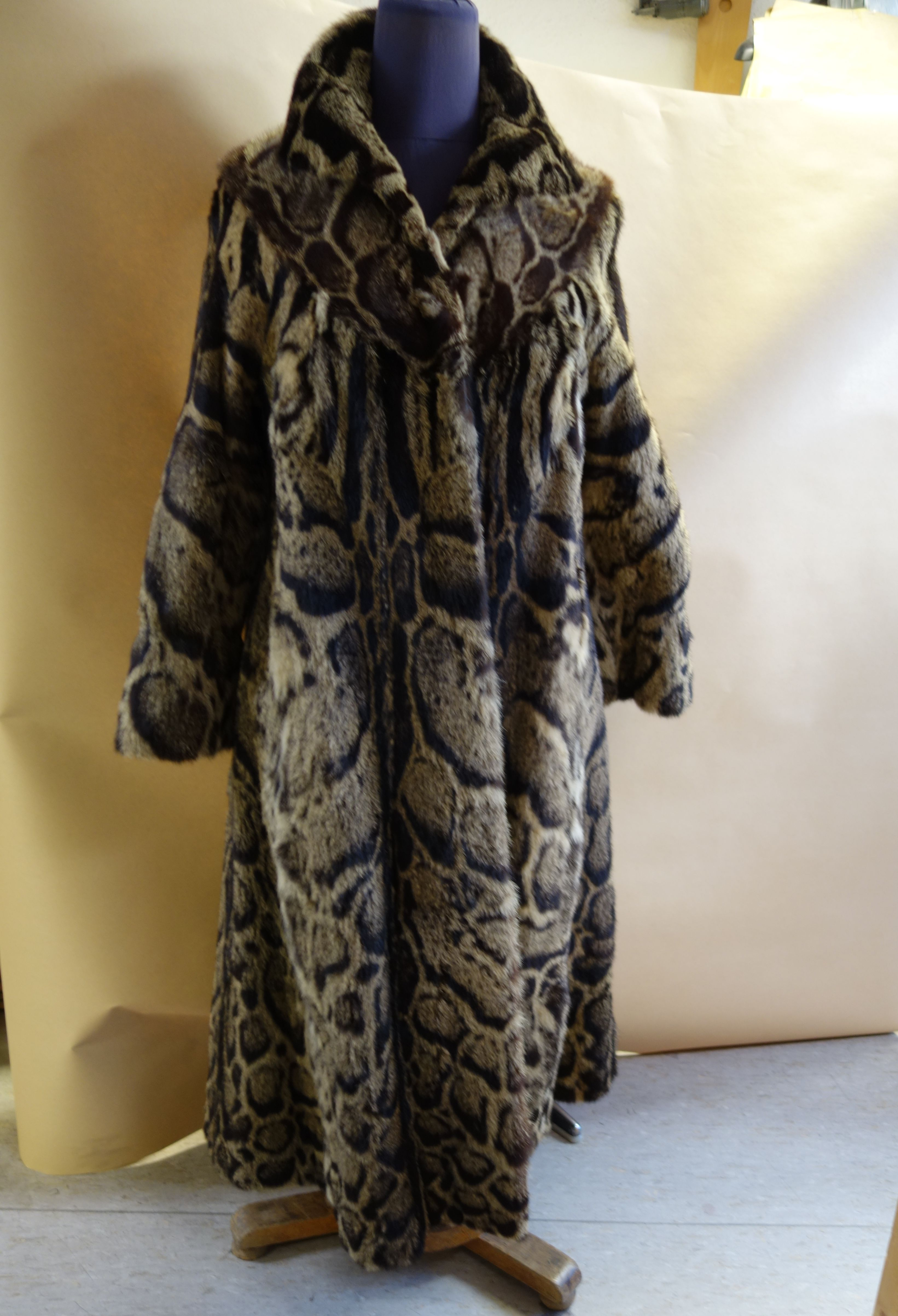
A coat made of clouded leopard skin. Poaching for the illegal trade of skins is one of the main threats to the clouded leopard.

Clouded leopard require larger areas of intact forest than are present in many parts of their range. They are threatened by habitat loss following large–scale deforestation and commercial poaching for the wildlife trade. In Myanmar, 301 body parts of at least 279 clouded leopards, mostly skins and skeletons, were observed in four markets surveyed between 1991 and 2006, despite the protected status of clouded leopards in Myanmar. Some markets are located near Myanmar's borders with China and Thailand and are used to facilitate cross-border smuggling.

In Nepal, 27 cases of clouded leopard body parts were discovered between November 1988 and March 2020 in nine districts of the country, comprising at least 51 individual clouded leopards. In 17 of these cases, the poachers and traders were arrested.

== Conservation ==
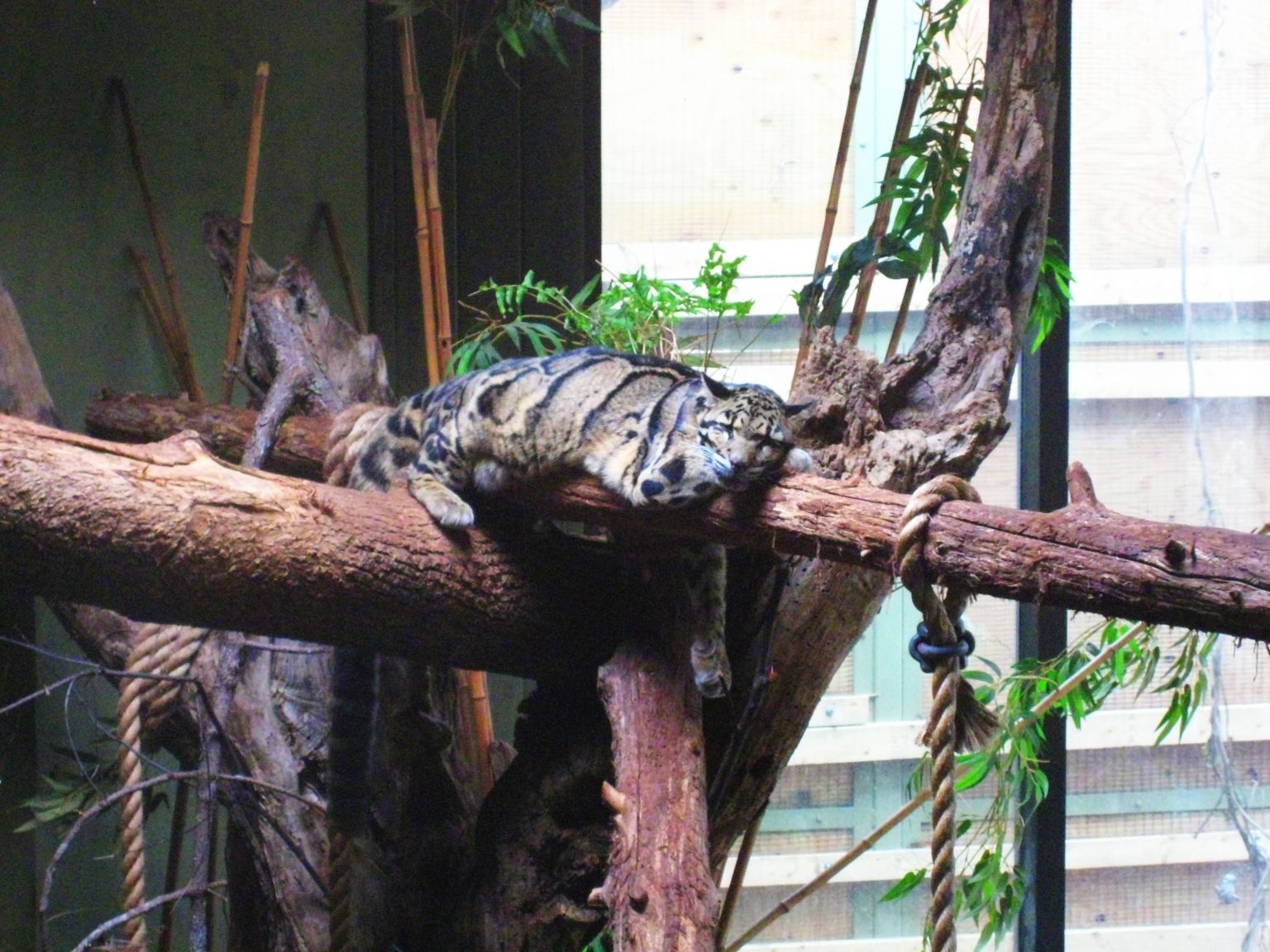
A clouded leopard resting on a tree trunk at the Toronto Zoo

The clouded leopard is listed in CITES Appendix I. Hunting is banned in Bangladesh, China, India, Malaysia, Myanmar, Nepal, Taiwan, Thailand and Vietnam. These bans, however, are poorly enforced in India, Malaysia and Thailand.

In the United States, the clouded leopard is listed as endangered under the Endangered Species Act, prohibiting trade in live animals or body parts.

International Clouded Leopard Day is celebrated each year on 4 August since 2018 in zoos and conservation organizations all over the world.

=== In captivity ===
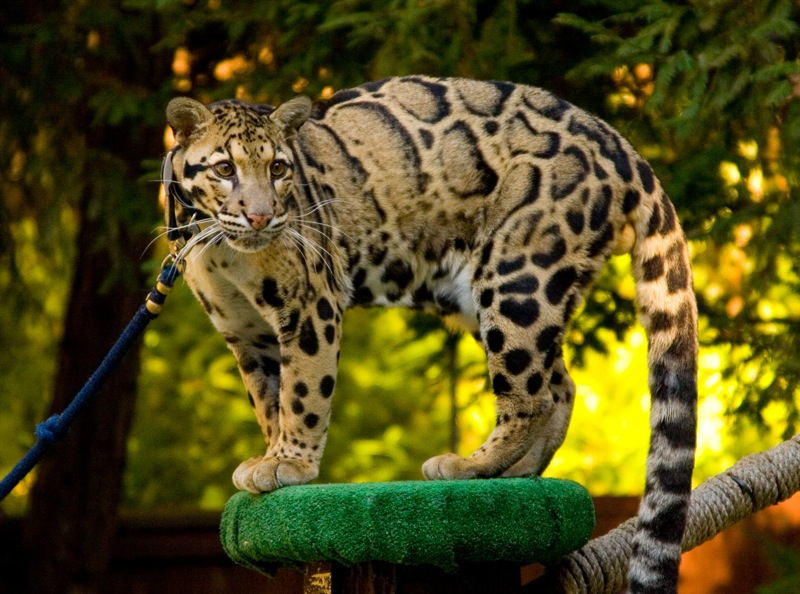
A clouded leopard at the San Diego Zoo, California

Clouded leopards have been kept in zoos since the early 20th century. The international studbook was initiated in the 1970s. Coordinated breeding programs were started in the 1980s and encompass the European Endangered Species Programme, the Species Survival Plan, and the Indian Conservation Breeding Programme. As of 2014, 64 institutions kept clouded leopards.

Early captive breeding programs involving clouded leopards were not successful, largely due to ignorance of their courtship behaviour. Males have the reputation of being aggressive towards females. For breeding success, it has been deemed extremely important that male and female clouded leopards are compatible. Introducing pairs at a young age gives them opportunities to bond and breed successfully. Facilities breeding clouded leopards need to provide the female with a secluded, off-exhibit area. There has been some recent captive breeding success using artificial insemination with cubs successfully born in 1992, 2015 and 2017.

A study on morbidity and mortality rate of 271 captive clouded leopards across 44 zoos in Europe, Asia and Australia showed that 17% of them died because of respiratory disease, 12% due to maternal neglect and starvation, 10% from generalized infectious disease, 10% from digestive diseases, and 10% from trauma.

In March 2011, two breeding females at the Nashville Zoo at Grassmere gave birth to three cubs, which were raised by zookeepers. Each cub weighed 0.23 kg (0.5 lb). In June 2011, two cubs were born at the Point Defiance Zoo & Aquarium. The breeding pair was brought from the Khao Kheow Open Zoo in Thailand in an ongoing education and research exchange program. Four cubs were born at Nashville Zoo in 2012. In May 2015, four cubs were born in Point Defiance Zoo & Aquarium.

== In culture ==
The clouded leopard is the state animal of the Indian state of Meghalaya. In the 1970s, the print of Rama Samaraweera's painting Clouded leopard was a best-seller in the US.

== See also ==
- List of largest cats
