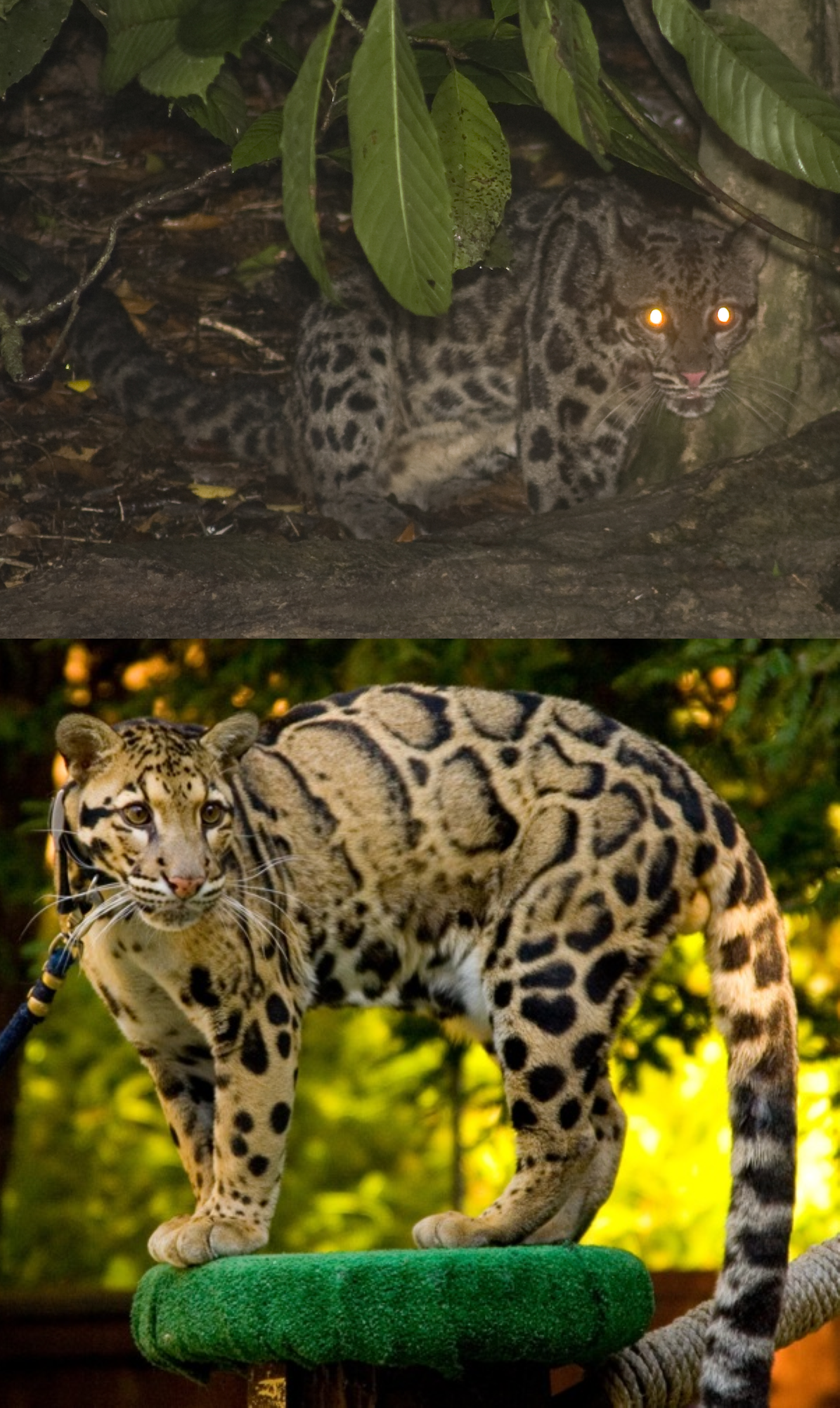
- Sunda clouded leopard (N. diardi) and clouded leopard (N. nebulosa)

Scientific classification
- Kingdom: Animalia
- Phylum: Chordata
- Class: Mammalia
- Order: Carnivora
- Family: Felidae
- Subfamily: Pantherinae
- Genus: Neofelis; Gray, 1867

Type species
- Felis macrocelis

Species
- N. nebulosa; N. diardi
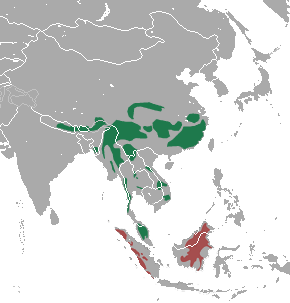
- Neofelis range

= Neofelis =

Neofelis Temporal range: Early Pleistocene to recent

Genus of carnivores

Neofelis is a genus comprising two extant species of cat in Southeast Asia: the clouded leopard (Neofelis nebulosa) of mainland Asia, and the Sunda clouded leopard (Neofelis diardi) of Sumatra and Borneo.

The scientific name Neofelis is a composite of the Greek word neo- (νέος) meaning 'young' and 'new', and the Latin word felis meaning 'cat'. It is placed as part of the subfamily Pantherinae, making it more closely related to the genus Panthera (which contains iconic big cats like the lion, tiger, leopard and jaguar) than other living felid species.

== Taxonomic history ==
The generic name Neofelis was first proposed by John Edward Gray in 1867 as comprising two species; Neofelis macrocelis occurring in the Himalaya, Malacca, and Thailand, and Neofelis brachyurus occurring in the former Formosa. Reginald Innes Pocock recognized the taxonomic classification of Neofelis in 1917, but admitted only the single species Neofelis nebulosa with several subspecies and macrocelis as the type specimen. For almost 90 years, the classification of Neofelis as a monotypic genus was widely accepted. In 2006, Neofelis diardi was found to be distinct from its continental relative Neofelis nebulosa and classified as a separate species.

== Characteristics ==
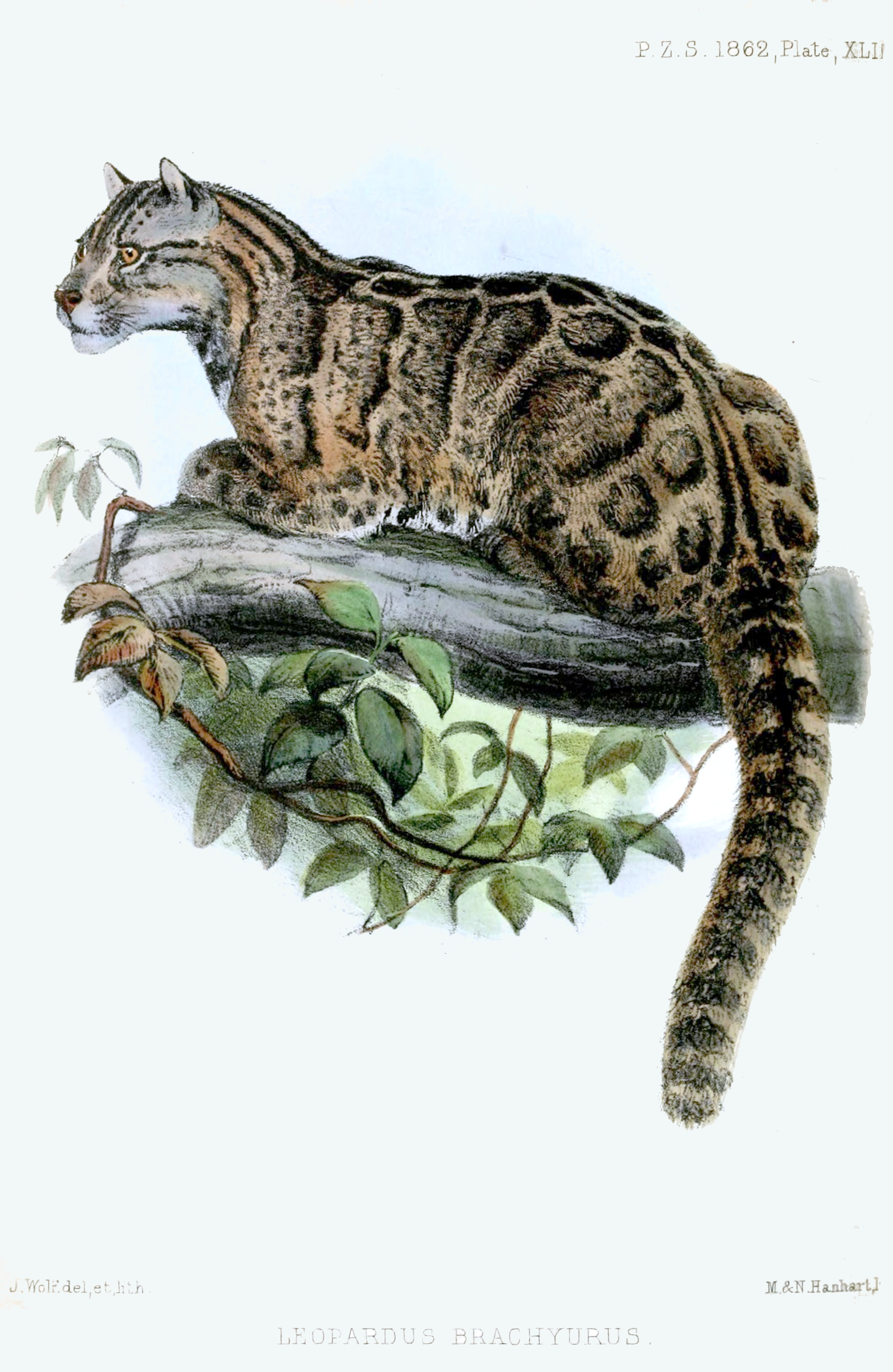
Formosan clouded leopard painted by Joseph Wolf in 1862

Gray described the genus Neofelis as having an elongate skull, a broad and rather produced face on the same plane as the forehead, a large and elongate nasal, a moderate orbit, a truncated lower jaw and very long conical upper and lower canine teeth with a sharp cutting hinder edge. This skull has resemblances to that of the fossil Smilodon, with very much elongated upper canines. Pocock described the skull of Neofelis as recalling in general features that of Panthera pardus, especially in the shortness and wide separation of the frontal and malar postorbital processes, relative proportion of mandibular teeth; but differing in the greater posterior width of the nasals, the thicker, more salient inferior edge of the orbit, and the mandible being greatly elevated anteriorly. As a result of this unusual skull anatomy, neofelids have a maximum gape of approximately 90 degrees, the biggest of extant carnivora, a trait shared by the extinct Machairodontinae subfamily.

The Sunda clouded leopard has longer upper canine teeth and a narrower palate between them.

== Distribution and habitat ==
Neofelis species range from Nepal and Sikkim eastward to south China and Hainan, southeastward to Myanmar, Annam, the Malay Peninsula, Sumatra, Java and Borneo. They are most closely associated with primary evergreen tropical rainforest, but make use of other types of habitat. Sightings have also been made in secondary and logged forest, as well as grassland and scrub. In the Himalayan foothills they have been recorded up to 1,450 m (4,760 ft).

=== Distribution of species ===
Between 1821 and 1862, several felids have been described from Southeast Asia that are subordinated under Neofelis today:

- Felis nebulosa was first described in 1821 by Edward Griffith based on a specimen brought from Guangdong in southern China. Populations range from the Himalayan foothills in Nepal through mainland Southeast Asia into China.
- Felis diardi was first described in 1823 by Georges Cuvier based on a skin and a drawing received from Java. The Sunda clouded leopard is probably restricted to the islands of Sumatra and Borneo. In Java only clouded leopard fossils were found.
- Leopardus brachyurus was first described in 1862 by Robert Swinhoe based on two to three skins from Taiwan. Today the Formosan clouded leopard is considered a clouded leopard subspecies Neofelis nebulosa brachyurus. It is now considered to be extinct.

== Threats ==
Deforestation is the foremost threat for both Neofelis species. They are also threatened by commercial poaching for the wildlife trade. Skins, claws and teeth are offered for decoration and clothing, bones and meat as substitute for tiger in traditional Asian medicines and tonics, and live animals for the pet trade. Few poaching incidents have been documented, but all range states are believed to have some degree of commercial poaching. In recent years, substantial domestic markets existed in Indonesia, Myanmar and Vietnam.

== Conservation ==
Both Neofelis species are listed in CITES Appendix I and are protected over most of their range. Hunting is banned in Bangladesh, Brunei, Cambodia, China, India, Indonesia, Malaysia, Myanmar, Nepal, Taiwan, Thailand, and Vietnam. Hunting regulations apply in Laos.
