= List of commonly used taxonomic affixes =

This is a list of common affixes used when scientifically naming species, particularly extinct species for whom only their scientific names are used, along with their derivations.

- a-, an-: Pronunciation: /ə/, /a/, /ən/, /an/. Origin: Ancient Greek: ἀ-, ἀν- (a, an-). Meaning: a prefix used to make words with a sense opposite to that of the root word; in this case, meaning 'without' or '-less'. This is usually used to describe organisms without a certain typical characteristic, as well as organisms in which that characteristic may not be immediately obvious.
  Examples: Anurognathus ('tailless jaw'); Apus ('footless'); Apteryx ('wingless'); Pteranodon ('wings without teeth'); Anura ('tailless'); Anophthalmus ('eyeless'); Aceros ('hornless'); Agnatha ('jawless'); Aceratherium ('hornless beast'); Arrhinoceratops ('noseless horned face'); Apterodon ('teeth without wings')
- -acanth, acantho-: Pronunciation: /eɪkænθ/, /eɪkænθoʊ/. Origin: Ancient Greek: ἄκανθα (ákantha). Meaning: spine, thorn.
  Examples: Acanthodes ('spiny base'); Acanthostega ('spine roof'); coelacanth ('hollow spine'); Acrocanthosaurus ('high-spined lizard'); Acanthoderes ('spiny neck'); Acanthamoeba ('spiny amoeba'); Metriacanthosaurus ('moderately-spined lizard'); Holacanthus ('full spine'); Triacanthus ('three spine'); Acanthaster ('spine star'); Acanthocephala ('spine head'), Anisacanthus ('unequal spine'); Acanthoceras ('spine horn'): Acanthogeophilus ('spiny earth-lover'); Acanthosicyos ('spiny gourd'); Acanthophis ('spiny snake'); Acanthomyrmex ('spiny ant')
- aeto-: Pronunciation: /aɛto/. Origin: Ancient Greek: ἀετός (aetós). Meaning: eagle.
  Examples: Aetonyx ('eagle claw'); Aetobatus ('eagle ray'); Aetosauria ('eagle lizard'); Ichthyaetus ('fish eagle')
- Aeno-: Pronunciation: /aɪˈnɔs/. Origin: Ancient Greek: αἰνός (ainós). Meaning: terrible. Example: Aenocyon ( terrible dog )
- afro-: Pronunciation: /ˈafro/. Origin: Latin: afro-. Meaning: African.

Examples: Afrovenator (African hunter); Afropithecus (African ape); Afrotheria (African beasts)

- -ales: Pronunciation: /ˈa.lis/. Origin: Latin: -ālis. Meaning: Used to form taxonomic names of orders for plants and fungi.

Examples: Enterobacterales ('Intestinal bacteria order'); Nitrosomonadales ('Nitrogen fixing bacteria order'); Fabales ('legume order'); Caryophyllales ('carnation plant order'); Myrtales ('myrtle order'); Malvales ('mallow order'); Agaricales ('agaric order'); Ranunculales ('buttercup order'); Lactobacillales ('lactic acid bacteria order'); Brassicales ('cabbage order'); Ophioglossales ('snake-tongue order'); Asterales ('aster order'); Apiales ('celery order'); Cucurbitales ('gourd order'); Celastrales ('staff-vine order'); Ginkgoales ('Ginkgo order'); Nymphaeales ('water lily order'); Fagales ('beech order'); Geastrales ('earthstar order'); Phallales ('stinkhorn order'); Rosales ('rose order'); Boletales ('porcino order'); Poales ('grass order'); Picramniales ('bitterbush order')

- amphi-: Pronunciation: /amfiː/, /amfɪ/. Origin: Ancient Greek: ἀμφί (amphí). Meaning: both.
  Examples: Amphibia ('two types of life'); Amphicoelias ('hollow at both ends'); Amphicyon ('ambiguous dog')
- aniso-: Pronunciation: /əˌnaɪsə(ʊ)/. Origin: Ancient Greek: ἄνισος (ánisos). Meaning: unequal.
  Examples: Anisodon ('unequal teeth'); Anisoptera ('unequal wing'); Polanisia ('many unequalities'), Anisacanthus ('unequal spine')
- -anthus, antho-: Pronunciation: /anθəs/, /anθoʊ/. Origin: Ancient Greek: ἄνθος (ánthos). Meaning: flower.
  Examples: Helianthus ('sunflower'); Anthophila ('flower-loving'); Dianthus ('Zeus flower'/'godly flower'); Anthodon ('flower teeth')
- arch-, archi-, archo-, -archon, -archus: Pronunciation: /ark/, /arkoʊ/, /arkɪ/, /arkɒn/, /arkəs/. Origin: Ancient Greek: ἀρχός (arkhós), meaning: ruler; ἀρχικός (arkhikós), meaning: ruling. Used for exceptionally large or widespread animals.
  Examples: Archelon ('ruling turtle'); Architeuthis ('ruling squid'); Thalattoarchon ('sea ruler'); Archosauria ('ruling lizard'); Andrewsarchus ('ruler of Andrews')
- archaeo-: Pronunciation: /arkiːɒ/, /arkiːoʊ/. Origin: Ancient Greek: ἀρχαῖος (arkhaîos). Meaning: ancient. Used for early versions of animals and plants.
  Examples: Archaeopteryx ('ancient wing'); Archaeoindris ('ancient Indri'); Archaeopteris ('ancient fern'); Archaeanthus ('ancient flower'); Archaeopotamus ('ancient of the river')
- -arctos, arcto-: Pronunciation: /arktoʊz/, /arktoʊ/. Origin: Ancient Greek: ἄρκτος (árktos). Meaning: bear.
  Examples: Phascolarctos ('pouch bear'); Arctodus ('bear tooth'); Arctocyon ('bear dog')
- arthro-: /arθroʊ/. Origin: Ancient Greek: ἄρθρον (árthron). Meaning: joint. Often used for animals with exoskeletons.
  Examples: Arthrospira ('jointed coil'); Arthropleura ('jointed rib'); Arthropoda ('jointed foot')
- aspido-, -aspis: Pronunciation: /aspɪdoʊ/, /aspɪs/. Origin: Ancient Greek: ἀσπίς (aspís). Meaning: shield. The suffix '-aspis' is used to describe armored fish.
  Examples: Cephalaspis ('head shield'); Sacabambaspis ('shield from Sacabamba'); Brindabellaspis ('shield from the Brindabella Ranges'; Aspidorhynchus ('shield snout')
- -aster: Pronunciation: /asˈtir/. Origin: Ancient Greek: ἀστήρ (astḗr). Meaning: star. Used to create genera relating to stars; most commonly applied to echinoderms such as sea stars and brittle stars.
  Examples: Acanthaster ('spine star'); Ophidiaster ('snake star'); Heliaster ('sun star'); Odontaster ('tooth star'); Asterozoa ('star animals'); Iranoaster ('star from Iran'); Asteroceras ('star horn'); Geastrum ('earth star')
- -avus: Pronunciation: /avus/. Origin: Latin: avus. Meaning: grandfather.
  Examples: Coelurosauravus ('hollow lizard grandfather'); Plateosauravus ('grandfather of Plateosaurus')
- -avis: Pronunciation: /əvɪs/. Origin: Latin: avis. Meaning: bird.
  Examples: Protoavis ('first bird'); Argentavis ('bird from Argentina'); Eoalulavis ('little-winged dawn bird')
- -bates: Pronunciation: /bætiz/. Origin: Ancient Greek: βάτης. Meaning: wanderer, one that treads.
  Examples: Hylobates ('forest wanderer'); Dendrobates ('tree wanderer')
- brachi-, brachy-: pronunciation: /brækɪ/. Origin: Ancient Greek: βραχύς, βραχίων (brakhús, brakhíōn). Meaning: short, and the short part of the arm, or upper arm, respectively. Used in its original meaning, and also to mean 'arm'.
  Examples: Brachylophosaurus ('short-crested lizard'); Brachiosaurus ('arm lizard'); Brachyceratops ('short-horned face'); Brachyura ('short tail'); Brachiopoda ('arm foot')
- bronto-: Pronunciation: /brɒntoʊ/. Origin: Ancient Greek: βροντή (brontḗ). Meaning: thunder. Used for large animals.
  Examples: Brontosaurus ('thunder lizard'), Brontotherium ('thunder beast'), Brontochelys ('thunder turtle')
- -canth, cantho-: see -acanth, acantho-.
- carcharo-: Pronunciation: /kərkæroʊ/. Origin: Ancient Greek: κάρχαρος (kárkharos). Meaning: sharp, jagged; extended via Ancient Greek: καρχαρίας (karkharías) to mean 'shark'.
  Examples: Carcharodon ('jagged tooth'), Carcharocles ('glorious shark'), Carcharodontosaurus ('shark toothed lizard')
- -cephalus, cephalo-, -cephale, -cephalian: Pronunciation: /sɛfələs/, /sɛfəloʊ̯/, /sɛfəli:/ /sɛfeɪliːən/. Origin: Ancient Greek: κεφαλή (kephalḗ). Meaning: head.
  Examples: Sclerocephalus ('hard head'); Euoplocephalus ('well-armored head'), Pachycephalosaurus ('thick headed lizard'), Amtocephale ('head from Amtgai'); Therocephalia ('beast-headed'); Cephalocarida ('head shrimp'); Lagocephalus ('hare head'); Pachycephala ('thick head'); Acanthocephala ('spine head')
- -ceras, cerat-, -ceratus: Pronunciation: /sɛrəs/, /sɛrət/, /sɛrətəs/. Origin: Ancient Greek: κέρας (kéras). Meaning: horn. Used for many horned animals, but most notably ceratopsians.
  Examples: Stegoceras ('roof horn'); Triceratops ('three-horned face'), Orthoceras ('straight horn'); Megaloceras ('big horn'); Ceratosaurus ('horned lizard'); Microceratops ('small horned face'); rhinoceros ('nose horn'); Albertoceras ('horn from Alberta'); Aepyceros ('high horn'); Lophoceros ('crest horn'); Buceros ('ox horn'); Dinocerata ('terrible horn'); Cameroceras ('chamber horn'); Endoceras ('inner horn'); Didymoceras ('twin horn'); Diceros ('two horn'); Megaloceros ('great horn'); Asteroceras ('star horn'); Acanthoceras ('spine horn')
- cetio-, -cetus: Pronunciation: /sɛtɪoʊ/, /siːtəs/. Origin: Ancient Greek κῆτος (kētos). Meaning: sea-monster. The suffix '-cetus' is used for whales or whale ancestors, while the prefix 'cetio-' is used for whale-like or large animals.
  Examples: Peregocetus ('travelling whale'); Cetiosaurus ('whale lizard'); Ambulocetus ('walking whale'); Pakicetus ('whale from Pakistan'), Perucetus ('whale from Peru'); Pachycetus ('thick whale'); Eocetus ('dawn whale'); Orycterocetus ('burrowing whale')
- -cheirus, chiro-: Pronunciation: /kaɪrəs/, /kaɪroʊ/. Origin: Ancient Greek: χείρ (kheír). Meaning: hand.
  Examples: Deinocheirus ('terrible hand'); Ornithocheirus ('bird hand'); Austrocheirus ('southern hand'); Haplocheirus ('simple hand'); Chiroptera ('hand wing'); Chiropotes ('hand drinker')
- -chelys, chelo-, -chelon: Pronunciation: /kəlɪs/, /kəlo/, /kəlon/. Origin: Ancient Greek: χέλυς, χελώνη (chelys, chelone ). Meaning: tortoise. Used for both tortoises and turtles.
  Examples: Megalochelys ('big tortoise'); Archelon ('ruling turtle'); Archelosauria ('Ruling tortoises and lizards')
- chloro-: Pronunciation: /kloroʊ/. Origin: Ancient Greek: χλωρός (khlōrós). Meaning: green.
  Examples: Chlorophyta ('green plant'); Chlorophyll ('green leaf'); Chlorospingus ('green finch'); Chlorophonia ('green song')
- choer-, choero-, -choerus: Pronunciation: /koɪr/, /koɪroʊ/. Origin: Ancient Greek: χοίρος (koíros). Meaning: pig.
  Examples: Choeroichthys ('pig-fish'); Choerophryne ('frog pig'); Choerodon ('pig tooth'); Hydrochoerus ('water pig'); Choeropotamus ('river pig'); Choeropsis ('pig resembler')
- coel-: Pronunciation: /siːl/ or /sɛl/ . Origin: Ancient Greek: κοῖλος (koîlos). Meaning: hollow.
  Examples: coelacanth ('hollow spine'); Coelodonta ('hollow tooth'); Coelophysis ('hollow form'); Amphicoelias ('hollow at both ends')
- cyan-, cyano-: Pronunciation: /saɪæno/. Origin: Ancient Greek: κυάνεος (kuáneos). Meaning: dark blue, blue, dark blue-green.
  Examples: Cyanocitta ('blue jay'); Cyanobacteria ('blue bacteria'); Cyanocorax ('blue raven')
- cyclo-: Pronunciation: /saɪkloʊ/ (or /saɪklɒ/). Origin: Ancient Greek: κύκλος (kúklos). Meaning: circle.
  Examples: Cyclomedusa ('circle Medusa'); Cyclostomata ('circle mouth')
- cyn-, -cyon: Pronunciation: /saɪn/, /saɪɒn/. Origin: Ancient Greek: κύων (kúon). Meaning: dog. Used for dogs or dog-like creatures.
  Examples: Cynodontia ('dog tooth'); Cynognathus ('dog jaw'); Cynopterus ('dog wing'); Arctocyon ('bear dog'); Procyon ('before the dog'); Cynocephalus ('dog head'); Xenocyon ('strange dog'); Hesperocyon ('western dog')
- -dactyl, -dactylus: Pronunciation: /dæktəl/, /dæktələs/. Origin: Ancient Greek: δάκτυλος (dáktulos). Meaning: finger, toe.
  Examples: Artiodactyla ('even toe'); Pterodactylus ('wing finger'); Perissodactyla ('uneven toe'); Ctenodactylus ('comb finger'); Phyllodactylus ('leaf finger'); Hemiphyllodactylus ('half leaf finger'); Odontodactylus ('tooth finger'); Stenodactylus ('narrow finger')
- -deres, -dira: Origin: Ancient Greek: δέρη (dére). Meaning: neck, collar.
  Examples: Acanthoderes ('spiny neck'); Cryptodira ('hidden neck'); Pleurodira ('rib neck')
- -derm: Pronunciation: /dɜrm/. Origin: Ancient Greek: δέρμα (dérma). Meaning: animal hide. Used for skin.
  Examples: Placodermi ('plated skin'); Echinodermata ('hedgehog skin'); Ostracodermi ('shell skin'); Pachydermata ('thick skin')
- -delphys, -delphis, delpho-: Pronunciation: /dɜlfɪs/, /dɜlfʊ/. Origin: Ancient Greek: δελφύς (delphis). Meaning: womb. Used for therian mammals.
  Examples: Sinodelphys ('Chinese womb'); Didelphis ('two womb'); Didelphodon ('two-womb [ie opossum] tooth'); Delphinus ('with a womb'); Monodelphis ('one womb')
- dendro-, -dendron, -dendrum: Pronunciation: /dɛn.dɹoʊ/, /ˈdɛndɹən/, /dɛndɹəm/. Origin: Ancient Greek: δένδρον (déndron). Meaning: tree.
  Examples: Rhododendron ('rose tree'); Liriodendron ('lily tree'); Dendrocnide ('tree nettle'); Epidendrum ('above tree'); Lepidodendron ('scaled tree'); Dendrobates ('tree climber'); Dendrocolaptes ('tree chiseller')
- di-: Pronunciation: /daɪ/. Origin: Ancient Greek: δίς (dís). Meaning: twice. Used to indicate two of something.
  Examples: Dilophosaurus ('two crested lizard'); Diceratops ('two-horned face'); diapsid ('two arches'); Didelphis ('two womb'); Dichrostigma ('two-colored brand'); Diprotodon ('two front teeth'); Diceros ('two horn'); Dipus ('two foot')
- dino-, deino-: Pronunciation: /daɪnoʊ/. Origin: Ancient Greek: δεινός (deinós). Meaning: 'terrible', 'formidable'. Used for presumably fearfully large or dangerous animals or animal parts.
  Examples: dinosaur ('terrible lizard'), Dinofelis ('terrible cat'), Dinornis ('terrible bird'); Deinonychus ('terrible claw'), Deinocheirus ('terrible hand'); Dinodocus ('terrible beam'); Deinosuchus ('terrible crocodile'), Dinohippus ('terrible horse'), Dinosorex ('terrible shrew'); Deinococcus ('terrible grannule'); Dinocerata ('terrible horn'); Dinocrocuta (‘Terrible hyena’)
- diplo-: Pronunciation: /dɪploʊ/, /dɪplo/. Origin: Ancient Greek: διπλόος, διπλοῦς (diplóos, diploûs). Meaning: double.
  Examples: Diplodocus ('double beam'); Diplopoda ('double feet'); Diplomonad ('double unit'); Diplovertebron ('double vertebra')
- -don, -dont, -donto-: see -odon, -odont, -odonto-.
- draco-: Pronunciation: /dreɪkoʊ/ Origin: Latin draco. Meaning: dragon.
  Examples: Dracophyllum ('dragon leaf'); Dracocephalum ('dragon head'); Dracaena ('female dragon'), Tethydraco ('Tethys dragon'), Phosphatodraco ('phosphates dragon').
- dromaeo-, dromeo-, -dromeus: Pronunciation: /droʊmɪoʊ/, /droʊmɪəs/ Origin: Ancient Greek: δρομαῖος (dromaîos). Meaning: runner.
  Examples: Dromaeosaurus ('running lizard'); Kulindadromeus ('runner from Kulinda'); Thalassodromeus ('sea runner'); Eodromaeus ('dawn runner'); Oryctodromeus ('burrowing runner')
- elasmo-: Pronunciation: /əl:æzːmoʊ/. Origin: Ancient Greek: ἐλασμός (elasmos). Meaning: plate.
  Examples: Elasmobranchii ('plated gill'); Elasmosaurus ('plated lizard'); Elasmotherium ('plated beast')
- -ensis, -ense: Meaning: living in; originating from
  Examples: Saimiri boliviensis ('from Bolivia'); Myotis chiloensis ('from Chile'); Anomalocaris canadensis ('from Canada')
- eo-: Pronunciation: /iːoʊ̯/. Origin: Ancient Greek: ἠώς (ēṓs). Meaning: dawn. Used for very early appearances of animals in the fossil record.
  Examples: Eohippus ('dawn horse'); Eomaia ('dawn Maia'); Eoraptor ('dawn thief'); Eolactoria ('dawn Lactoria'); Eotyrannus ('dawn tyrant'); Eocetus ('dawn whale')
- -erpeton: Pronunciation: /ɜrpətɒn/. Origin: Ancient Greek: ἑρπετόν (herpetón). Meaning: reptile (literally, 'creeping thing'); used for amphibians.
  Examples: Hynerpeton ('creeper from Hyner'); Greererpeton ('creeper from Greer'); Arizonerpeton ('creeper from Arizona'); Albanerpeton ('creeper of La Grive Saint Alban')
- eu-: Pronunciation: /iːu̟/. Origin: Ancient Greek: εὖ (eû). Meaning: 'good', 'well'; also extended via Neo-Latin to mean 'true'. Used in a variety of ways, often to indicate well-preserved specimens, well-developed bones, 'truer' examples of fossil forms, or simply admiration on the part of the discoverer.
  Examples: Euparkeria ('good one of Parker's'); Euhelopus ('good marsh foot'); Eustreptospondylus ('well-curved vertebrae'); Eucoelophysis ('truly hollow form'); Eubrachyura ('truly short tail'); Eumillipes ('true thousand-foot'); Euphonia ('of good song'); Eudyptes ('well diver')
- -felis: Pronunciation: /fiːlɪs/. Origin: Latin: felis, feles. Meaning: cat. Felis alone is the genus name for the group that includes the domestic cat.
  Examples: Dinofelis ('terrible cat'); Eofelis ('dawn cat'); Pardofelis ('leopard cat')
- -form, -formes: Pronunciation: /foʊrm/, /foʊrms/. Origin: Latin: forma. Meaning: shape, form. Used for large groups of animals that share similar characteristics; also used in names of bird and fish orders.
  Examples: Galliformes ('chicken form'); Anseriformes ('goose form'); Squaliformes ('shark form'); Tetraodontiformes ('four-tooth form'); Macropodiformes ('big-foot form'); Octopodiformes ('eight-foot form'); Vombatiformes ('wombat form'); Caniformia ('dog form'); Feliformia ('cat form'); Scarabaeiformia ('beetle form'); Bucerotiformes ('ox-horn form'); Elephantiformes ('elephant form'); Lemuriformes ('lemur form'); Mammaliaformes ('mammal form'); Decapodiformes ('ten-foot form'); Psittaciformes ('parrot form'); Coelacanthiformes ('hollow-spine form'); Thylacosmiliformes ('pouched knife form'); Cucujiformia ('Cucujus form'); Struthioniformes ('ostrich form') Gobeliformes (‘goblin form’)
- giga-, gigant-, giganto-: Pronunciation: /gi:gə/, /d͡ʒaɪgænt/, /d͡ʒaɪgæntoʊ/. Origin: Ancient Greek: γίγας, γίγαντος (gígas, gigantos). Meaning: giant, of a giant, respectively. Used for large species.
  Examples: Giganotosaurus ('giant southern lizard'); Gigantopithecus ('giant ape'); Gigantoraptor ('giant seizer'); Gigantopterus ('giant fin'); Gigantspinosaurus ('giant-spined lizard')
- -gnath-, gnatho-, -gnathus: Pronunciation: /neɪθ/, /neɪθoʊ/, /neɪθəs/ (or /gneɪθəs/). Origin: Ancient Greek: γνάθος (gnáthos). Meaning: jaw.
  Examples: Caenagnathasia ('recent jaw from Asia'); Gnathostoma ('jaw mouth'); Cynognathus ('dog jaw'); Compsognathus ('elegant jaw'); Gnathosaurus ('jaw lizard'); Gnathostomata ('jaw mouth'); Entognatha ('inner jaw'); Oedignathus ('swollen jaw'); Agnatha ('jawless'); Anurognathus ('tailless jaw')
- haplo-: Pronunciation: /hæplə/. Origin: Ancient Greek: ἁπλός (haplós). Meaning: simple.
  Examples: Haplorhini ('simple nose'); Haplocheirus ('simple hand')
- hemi-: Pronunciation: /hɛmi/. Origin: Ancient Greek: ἡμι- (hēmi-). Meaning: half.
  Examples: Hemicyon ('half-dog'); Hemichordata ('half-chordate'); Hemiptera ('half-wing'); Hemispingus ('half-finch'); Hemiphyllodactylus ('half-leaf finger')
- hespero-: Pronunciation: /hɛspəroʊ/. Origin: Ancient Greek: ἕσπερος (hésperos). Meaning: western (originally, 'evening').
  Examples: Hesperornis ('western bird'); Hesperocyon ('western dog'); Hesperosaurus ('western lizard')
- hippus, hippo-: Pronunciation: /hɪpəs/, /hɪpoʊ/. Origin: Ancient Greek: ἵππος (híppos). Meaning: horse.
  Examples: Eohippus ('dawn horse'); Hippodraco ('horse dragon'); Hippopotamus ('river horse'); Hippocampus ('sea-monster horse'); Hippophae ('horse light'); Merychippus ('ruminant horse')
- hyl-, hylo-: Pronunciation: /haɪl/, /haɪloʊ/ (or /haɪlɒ/). Origin: Ancient Greek: ὕλη ('húlē'). Meaning: wood, forest.
  Examples: Hylonomus ('forest dweller'); Hylobates ('forest walker'); Hylarana ('forest frog')
- -ia: Pronunciation: /iːə/. Origin: Ancient Greek: -ια, -εια (-ia, -eia). Meaning: an abstraction usually used as an honorific for a person or place.
  Examples: Dickinsonia ('for Dickinson'); Cooksonia ('for Cookson'); Coloradia ('for Colorado'); Edmontonia ('for Edmonton'); Thomashuxleya ('for Thomas Huxley'); Superstitionia ('for Superstition Mountains'); Bolivaria ('for Bolivar'); Macadamia ('for John Macadam'); Pikaia ('for Pika Peak'); Leanchoilia ('for Leanchoil Station'); Opabinia ('for Opabin pass')
- ichthyo-, -ichthys: Pronunciation: /ɪkθioʊs/, /ɪkθis/. Origin: Ancient Greek: ἰχθύς (ikhthús). Meaning: fish. The suffix '-ichthys' is used for fish, while the prefix 'ichthyo-', while used for fish, is also used for fish-like creatures.
  Examples: Ichthyosauria ('fish lizard'); Leedsichthys ('fish from Leeds'); Haikouichthys ('fish from Haikou'); Ichthyostega ('fish roof'); Osteichthyes ('bony fish'); Chondrichthyes ('cartilaginous fish'); Tripodichthys ('three-foot fish); Choeroichthys ('pig-fish'); Trachichthys ('rough fish'); Ichthyotitan ('fish Titan'); Ichthyaetus ('fish eagle'); Ichthyolestes ('fish robber'); Ichthyophaga ('fish eater')
- -lania, Pronunciation: /læniːə/, Origin: Ancient Greek: ἀλαίνειν (alaínein): Meaning: to wander. Used for animals that are found in most places around continents.
  Examples: Meiolania ('weak wanderer'); Megalania ('great wanderer');Warkalania ('turtle wanderer');
- leo-: Pronunciation: /lɛʊ/. Origin: Ancient Greek: λέων (léon): Meaning: lion.
  Examples: Leopardus ('spotted lion'); Leontopodium ('lion foot'); Leontopithecus ('lion ape'); Myrmeleon ('ant lion'); chameleon ('earth lion')
- lio-: Pronunciation: /liː.oː/. Origin: Ancient Greek: λειόω (leióō): Meaning: Make smooth
  Examples: Liogramma ('smooth writing'); Liopleurodon ('smooth-sided teeth')
- -lepis, lepido-: Pronunciation: /lɛpɪs/ /lɛpɪdoʊ/ (or /lɛpɪdɒ/). Origin: Ancient Greek: λεπίς (lepis). Meaning: scale.
  Examples: Mongolepis ('Mongolian scale'); Stagonolepis ('ornamented scale'); Polymerolepis ('many part scale'); Lepidosauria ('scaled lizards'); Lepidoptera ('scaled wing'); Lepidodendron ('scaled tree')
- -lestes: Pronunciation: /lɛstiːz/. Origin: Ancient Greek: λῃστής (lēistḗs). Meaning: robber.
  Examples: Carpolestes ('fruit robber'); Ornitholestes ('bird robber'); Sarcolestes ('flesh robber'); Necrolestes ('grave robber'); Ichthyolestes ('fish robber')
- long: Pronunciation: /lʊng/. Origin: simplified Chinese: 龙; traditional Chinese: 龍. Meaning: dragon. Used for dinosaur finds in China.
  Examples: Mei long ('sleeping dragon'); Bolong ('small dragon'); Zuolong ('dragon of Zuo'); Shaochilong ('shark toothed dragon')
- -lopho-, -lophus: Pronunciation: /lɒfoʊ/, /ləfəs/. Origin: Ancient Greek: λόφος (lóphos). Meaning: A bird's crest. Used for animals with crests on their heads.
  Examples: Dilophosaurus ('two-crested lizard'); Brachylophosaurus ('short-crested lizard'); Saurolophus ('lizard crest'); Teinolophos ('extended crest'); Lophoceros ('crest horn')
- lyco-: Pronunciation: /lɪkoʊ/. Origin: Ancient Greek: λύκος (lýkos). Meaning: wolf.
  Examples: Lycopodium ('wolf foot'); Lycodon ('wolf tooth'); Lycoperdon ('wolf fart')
- macro-: Pronunciation: /mækroʊ/. Origin: Ancient Greek: μακρός (makrós). Meaning: (correctly) long; (usually) large.
  Examples: macropod ('big foot'); Macrodontophion ('big tooth snake'); Macrogryphosaurus ('big enigmatic lizard')
- -maia, maia-: Pronunciation: /meiə/ Origin: Ancient Greek: Μαῖα (Maîa). Meaning: Originally the mother of Hermes in Greek mythology and the goddess of growth in Roman mythology, alternatively spelled Maja. Frequently used to indicate maternal roles, this word should not be construed as translating directly to 'mother' (Latin māter; Ancient Greek μήτηρ mḗtēr); aside from being a proper name, in Ancient Greek 'maîa' can translate to 'midwife' or 'foster mother' and was used as an honorific address for older women, typically translated into English as 'Good Mother'.
  Examples: Maiasaura ('Good Mother/Maia's lizard'); Eomaia ('dawn Maia'); Juramaia ('Jurassic Maia'); Maiacetus ('mother whale')
- mega-, megalo-: Pronunciation: /mɛga/, /mɛgaloʊ̯/. Origin: Ancient Greek: μέγας, μεγάλη (mégas, megálē). Meaning: big/great.
  Examples: Megarachne ('great spider'); Megalosaurus ('great lizard'); megalodon ('great tooth'); Megaloceros ('great horn')
- micro-: Pronunciation: /maɪkroʊ̯/. Origin: Ancient Greek: μικρός (mikrós). Meaning: 'small'.
  Examples: Microraptor ('small thief'); Microvenator ('small hunter'); Microceratops ('small horned face')
- mimo-, -mimus: /maɪmoʊ̯/, /maɪməs/. Origin: Latin: mimus. Meaning: actor. Used for creatures that resemble others.
  Examples: Struthiomimus; ('ostrich mimic'); Ornithomimus ('bird mimic'); Gallimimus ('chicken mimic'); Ornithomimosauria ('bird mimic lizard')
- -monas, -monad: Pronunciation: /moʊnas/, /monas/, /moʊnad/, /monad/. Origin: Ancient Greek: μονάς (monás). Meaning: unit. Used for single-celled organisms.
  Examples: Chlamydomonas ('cloak unit'); Pseudomonas ('false unit'); Metamonad ('encompassing unit')
- -morph: Pronunciation: /moʊrf/. Origin: Ancient Greek: μορφή (morphḗ). Meaning: form, shape. Used for large groups of animals which share a common genetic lineage
  Examples: Crocodylomorpha ('crocodile form'); Sauropodomorpha ('sauropod form'); Muscomorpha ('fly form'); Dimorphodon ('two shaped teeth'); Didelphimorphia ('two-womb form'); Hystricomorpha ('porcupine form'); Lagomorpha ('hare form'); Batomorphi ('ray form'); Squalomorphi ('shark form'); Dasyuromorphia ('hairy-tail form'); Scolopendromorpha ('thorn-earthworm form'); Lithobiomorpha ('stone-life form'); Geophilomorpha ('earth-loving form')
- -nax, -anax-: Pronunciation: /nax/, /ænax/. Origin: Ancient Greek: ἄναξ (ánax). Meaning: king.
  Example: Lythronax ('gore lord');
- -noto-: Pronunciation: /notoʊ/. Origin: Ancient Greek: νότος. Meaning: south, southern wind. Used for organisms found in the Southern Hemisphere.
  Examples: Giganotosaurus ('giant southern lizard'); Notosuchus ('southern crocodile'); Notopalaeognathae ('southern old jaws')
- -nych, nycho-, -nyx: see -onych, onycho-, -onyx.
- -odon, -odont, -odonto-, -odus: Pronunciation: /oʊdɒn/, /oʊdɒnt/, /oʊdɒntoʊ/, /oʊdəs/. Origin: Ancient Greek: ὀδούς, ὀδόντος (odoús, odontos). Meaning: tooth, of a tooth, respectively.
  Examples: Dimetrodon ('two-measures of teeth'), cynodont ('dog tooth'); Carcharodontosaurus ('shark tooth lizard'), Otodus ('ear tooth'), Arctodus ('bear tooth'); Tetraodon ('four teeth'); Octodon ('eight teeth'); Anisodon ('unequal teeth'); Monodon ('one tooth'); Hexaprotodon ('six forward teeth'); Diprotodontia ('two forward teeth'); Odontodactylus ('tooth finger'); Anthodon ('flower teeth'); Thrinaxodon ('trident teeth'); Zanclodon ('scythe teeth'); Xiphodon ('sword tooth'); Solenodon ('channel tooth')
- -oides, -odes: Pronunciation: /oiːdiːz/, /oʊːdiːz/. Origin: Ancient Greek: εἶδος (eîdos). Meaning: likeness. Used for species that resemble other species.
  Examples: Hypocnemoides ('like Hypocnemis'); Aetobarbakinoides ('like the long-legged buzzard'); Callianthemoides ('like Callianthemum'); Argyrodes ('like silver')
- onycho-, -onychus, -onyx: /ɒnikoʊ/, /ɒnikəs/ (or /ɒnaɪkoʊ/, ɒnaɪkəs/), /ɒniks/. Origin: Ancient Greek: ὄνυξ (ónux). Meaning: claw.
  Examples: Deinonychus ('terrible claw'); Euronychodon ('European claw tooth'); Nothronychus ('sloth claw'), Baryonyx ('heavy claw')
- ophi-: Pronunciation: /ɒfɪs/. Origin: Ancient Greek: ὄφις (óphis). Meaning: snake. Used for Ophidia or snake-like animals.
  Examples: Ophiacodon ('snake tooth'); Ophisaurus ('snake lizard'); Ophiopogon ('snake beard'); Ophiuroidea ('like snake-tail'); Ophidiaster ('snake star'); Ophioglossum ('snake tongue')
- -ops: Pronunciation: /ɒps/. Origin: Ancient Greek: ὄψ (óps). Meaning: face, eye.
  Examples: Triceratops ('three-horned face'); Lycaenops ('wolf face'); Moschops ('calf face'); Spinops ('spine face'); Triops ('three eyes'); Brachyceratops ('short-horned face')
- -ornis, ornith-, ornitho-: Pronunciation: /oʊ̯rnɪs/, /oʊ̯rnɪθ/, /oʊ̯rnɪθoʊ̯/. Origin: Ancient Greek: ὄρνις, ὄρνιθος (órnis, órnithos). Meaning: bird, of a bird respectively. 'ornith-' and 'ornitho-' are generally used for animals with birdlike characteristics; the suffix '-ornis' is generally applied to fossil bird species.
  Examples: Ornithischia ('bird-hipped'); Ornithocheirus ('bird hand'); Eoconfuciusornis ('dawn bird of Confucius'); Ornithorhynchus ('bird snout'); Ornithopoda ('bird foot'); Ornithoptera ('bird wing'); Ornitholestes ('bird robber')
- orth-, ortho-: Pronunciation: /oʊ̯rθ/, /oʊ̯rθoʊ̯/. Origin: Ancient Greek: ὄρθος (órthos). Meaning: straight.
  Examples: Orthocone ('straight cone'); Orthoceras ('straight horn'); Orthacanthus ('straight spine'); Orthopus ('straight foot')
- oryctero-, orycto-: Pronunciation: /ohr-ik-ter-oh/, /ohr-ik-toh/. Origin: Ancient Greek: ὀρυκτήρ (oruktḗs). Meaning: burrower.
  Examples: Oryctodromeus ('burrowing runner'); Oryctolagus ('burrowing hare'); Orycteropus ('burrowing foot'); Oryctorhynchus ('burrowing snout'); Oryctocephalus ('burrowing head'); Orycterocetus ('burrowing whale')
- pachy-: Pronunciation: /pæki/ Origin: Ancient Greek: παχύς (pakhús). Meaning: thick.
  Examples: Pachycephalosaurus ('thick-headed lizard'); Pachylemur ('thick lemur'); Pachyuromys ('thick tailed mouse'); Pachydermata ('thick skin'); Pachycetus ('thick whale'); Pachypodium ('thick foot'); Pachypanthera ('thick panther')
- para-: Pronunciation: /pærɑː/ Origin: Ancient Greek: παρά (pará). Meaning: near. Used for species that resemble previously named species.
  Examples: Paranthodon ('nearly flower tooth'); Pararhabdodon ('near fluted tooth'); Parasaurolophus ('near lizard crest'); Paraceratherium ('near hornless beast'); Parameles ('near badger')
- -pelta: Pronunciation: /pɛltə:/ Origin: Ancient Greek: πέλτη (péltē). Meaning: shield. Frequently used for ankylosaurs.
  Examples: Sauropelta ('lizard shield'); Dracopelta ('dragon shield'); Cedarpelta ('shield from the Cedar Mountains')
- -phagus, -phagan-: Pronunciation: /feɪgəs/, /feɪgən/. Origin: Ancient Greek: φάγος (phágos). Meaning: eater, eating, glutton. Used for organisms perceived as eating a particular type of thing.
  Examples: Saurophaganax ('lord of the lizard-eaters'); Ophiophagus ('snake-eater'); Myrmecophaga ('ant-eater'); Oophaga ('egg-eater'); Musophaga ('banana-eater'); Meliphaga ('honey-eater'); Polyphaga ('many-eater'); Phytophaga ('plant-eater'); Myxophaga ('mucus-eater'); Ichthyophaga ('fish eater')
- -philus, -phila, philo-: Pronunciation: /fiːləs/, /fiːlə/, /fiːloʊ/. Origin: Ancient Greek: φίλος (phílos). Meaning: dear, beloved, loving. Used for organisms perceived as having a fondness for a particular thing.
  Examples: Sarcophilus ('flesh-loving'); Drosophila ('dew-loving'); Anthophila ('flower-loving'); Philodendron ('loving tree'); Geophilus ('earth-loving'); Cnemophilus ('slope lover'); Spermophilus ('seed-loving')
- -phyton, -phyta, phyto-, -phyte: Pronunciation: /faɪtən/, /faitə/, /faɪtoʊ/, /faɪt/. Origin: Ancient Greek: φυτόν (phutón). Meaning: plant.
  Examples: Spermatophyte ('seed plant'); Rhyniophyte ('plant of the Rhynie chert'); Phytophthora ('plant destroyer'); Phytolacca ('plant lac'); Chlorophyta ('green plant')
- -pithecus, pitheco-: Pronunciation: /piθəkəs/, /piθəkoʊ/, //piθəkə/. Origin: Ancient Greek: πίθηκος (píthēkos). Meaning: ape, monkey.
  Examples: Australopithecus ('southern ape'); Ardipithecus ('floor ape'); Gigantopithecus ('giant ape'); Leontopithecus ('lion monkey'); Pithecellobium ('monkey earring'); Rhinopithecus ('nose monkey')
- platy-: Pronunciation: /ˈplætɪ/. Origin: Ancient Greek πλατύς (platús). Meaning: flat. Used for creatures that are flat or have flat parts.
  Examples: Platyhelminthes ('flat worm'); Platybelodon ('flat spear-tusk'); Platycodon ('flat bell'); Platypus ('flat foot'); Uroplatus ('flat tail')
- plesio-, plesi-: Pronunciation: /pliːziːoʊ/, /pliːz/ (or /pliːʒ/). Origin: Ancient Greek πλησίον (plēsíon). Meaning: near. Used for species that bear similarities to other species.
  Examples: Plesiosaurus ('near lizard'); Plesiorycteropus ('near burrowing-foot'); Plesiobaena ('near Baena'); Plesiadapis ('near Adapis')
- -pod, podo-, -pus: Pronunciation: /pɒd/, /pɒdoʊ/, /pʊs/. Origin: Ancient Greek πούς, ποδός (poús, podós). Meaning: foot, of the foot, respectively.
  Examples: Ornithopoda ('bird foot'); Brachypodosaurus ('short footed lizard'); Moropus and Bradypus ('slow foot'); Octopus ('eight foot'); Platypus ('flat foot'); Orycteropus ('burrowing foot'); Decapoda ('ten foot'); Gastropoda ('belly foot'); Hexapoda ('six foot'); Erectopus ('forward foot'); Orthopus ('straight foot'); Tylopoda ('calloused foot'); Onychopoda ('claw foot'); Cephalopoda ('head foot'); Ailuropoda ('cat foot'); Hymenopus ('membrane foot'); Uropoda ('tail foot')
- -prion: Pronunciation: /prɪɒn/. Origin: Ancient Greek πριὢν. Meaning: saw.
  Examples: Helicoprion ('spiral saw'); Ornithoprion ('bird saw'); Onychoprion ('claw saw'); Suchoprion ('crocodile saw'). Prions are a subfamily of saw-beaked petrels.
- pro-, protero-: pronunciation: /proʊ̯/, /proʊ̯tεroʊ̯/. Origin: Ancient Greek πρό, πρότερος (pró, próteros). Meaning: before. Usually used for ancestral forms.
  Examples: Proterosuchus ('early crocodile'); Procompsognathus ('early elegant jaw'); Prosaurolophus ('early lizard crest'); Proteroctopus ('early eight-foot')
- proto-: Pronunciation: /proʊtoʊ/. Origin: Ancient Greek πρῶτος (prōtos). Meaning: first. Used for early appearances in the fossil record.
  Examples: Protoceratops ('first horned face'); Protognathosaurus ('first jaw lizard'); Protohadros ('first hadrosaur')
- psittaco-, -psitta: Pronunciation: /sitɑːkoʊ/, /psitə/. Origin: Ancient Greek ψιττακός (psittakós). Meaning: parrot. 'Psittaco-' is used for parrot-like creatures, while the suffix 'psitta' is used for parrots.
  Examples: Psittacosaurus ('parrot lizard'); Cyclopsitta ('Cyclops parrot'); Xenopsitta ('strange parrot'); Psittaciformes ('parrot form')
- pter-, ptero-, -pterus, pteryg-, -ptera, -pteryx. Pronunciation: /ter/, /teroʊ/, /pterəs/, /terɪg/, /pterə/, /pterɪx/. Origin: Ancient Greek πτέρυξ, πτέρυγος (pterux, ptérugos). Meaning: wing, of a wing, respectively. Used for many winged creatures, but also expanded to mean 'fin', and used for many undersea arthropods. The suffix '-ptera' is also used in orders of winged insects.
  Examples: Brachypterygius ('short finned'); Brachyptera ('short wing'); Pteranodon ('toothless wing'); Pterodactylus ('winged finger'); Eurypterus ('wide wing' or fin); Pterygotus ('winged' or finned); Coleoptera ('sheathed wing'); Camaroptera ('arched wing'); Archaeopteryx ('ancient wing'); Stenopterygius ('narrow finned'); Lepidoptera ('scaled wing'); Chiroptera ('hand wing'); Dermoptera ('skin wing'); Raphidioptera ('needle wing'); Rhomboptera ('rhombus wing'); Orthoptera ('straight wing'); Mecoptera ('long wing'); Delphinapterus ('dolphin fin'); Megaloptera ('great wing'); Megaptera ('great fin'); Neopterygii ('new fin'); Titanoptera ('Titan wing'); Sarcopterygii ('flesh fin'); Actinopterygii ('ray fin'); Neuroptera ('net wing')
- -pus: see -pod, -podo-, -pus.
- -raptor, raptor-: Pronunciation: /ræptər/. Origin: Latin raptor. Meaning: 'robber, thief'. Frequently used for dromaeosaurids or similar animals. The term 'raptor' by itself may also be used for a dromeosaurid, a Velociraptor, or originally, a bird of prey.
  Examples: Velociraptor ('speedy thief'); Utahraptor ('thief from Utah'); Raptorex ('thief king')
- -rex: Pronunciation: /rεks/. Origin: Latin rex. Meaning: king. Often used for large or impressive animals.
  Examples: Raptorex ('thief king'); Dracorex ('dragon king'); Tyrannosaurus rex ('tyrant lizard king')
- -rhina, rhino-, -rhinus: Pronunciation: /raɪnə/ /raɪnoʊ̯/, /raɪnəs/. Origin: Ancient Greek ῥίς (rhís). Meaning: nose.
  Examples: Altirhinus ('high nose'); Pachyrhinosaurus ('thick-nosed lizard'); Lycorhinus ('wolf nose'); Arrhinoceratops ('noseless horned face'); Cretoxyrhina ('Cretaceous sharp nose'); Rhinoceros ('nose horn'); Burhinus ('ox nose'); Rhinopithecus ('nose monkey'); Pachyrhinus ('thick nose')
- rhodo-: Pronunciation: /roʊdoʊ/, /rodoʊ/. Origin: Ancient Greek ῥόδον (rhódon). Meaning: 'rose'. Used for red-colored or otherwise rose-like organisms.
  Examples: Rhododendron ('rose tree'); Rhodophyta ('rose plant'); Rhodomonas ('rose unit')
- rhyncho-, -rhynchus: Pronunciation: /rɪnkoʊ/, /rɪnkəs/. Origin: Ancient Greek ῥύγχος (rhúnkhos). Meaning: 'beak', 'snout'.
  Examples: Rhamphorhynchus ('beak snout'); Aspidorhynchus ('shield snout'); Ornithorhynchus ('bird snout'); Rhynchosauria ('beaked lizard'); Rhynchocephalia ('beaked head'); Oncorhynchus ('bent snout'); Scaphirhynchus ('shovel snout'); Oryctorhynchus ('burrowing snout'); Thalattorhynchus ('sea snout'); Xiphorhynchus ('sword snout'); Kinorhyncha ('moving snout')
- sarco-: Pronunciation: /sɑːrkʊ/. Origin: Ancient Greek σάρξ (sárx). Meaning: flesh. Used for flesh-eating animals or animals and plants with fleshy parts
  Examples: Sarcophilus ('flesh-loving'); Sarcopterygii ('fleshy fin'); Sarcosuchus ('flesh crocodile')
- saur, sauro-, -saurus, -saura: Pronunciation: /sɔər/, /sɔəroʊ/, /sɔərəs/, /sɔəra/. Origin: Ancient Greek σαῦρος (saûros). Meaning: lizard. Used for dinosaurs and other extinct (and sometimes modern) reptiles.
  Examples: Dinosaur ('terrible lizard'); Mosasaur ('lizard from the Meuse River'), Tyrannosaurus ('tyrant lizard'), Allosaurus ('other lizard'), Sauroposeidon ('lizard of Poseidon'), Maiasaura ('caring mother lizard'), Bonitasaura ('lizard from La Bonita'), Pleurosaurus ('rib lizard'); Chlamydosaurus ('cloak lizard'); Lanzhousaurus (“Lanzhou lizard”)
- sin-, sino-: Pronunciation; /sɪn/, /saɪnoʊ̯/. Origin: Latin: Sina. Meaning: from China.
  Examples: Sinornithosaurus; ('Chinese bird-lizard'); Sinosauropteryx ('Chinese lizard wing'); Sinoceratops ('Chinese horned face'); Sinraptor ('Chinese thief'); Sinomammut ('Chinese mammoth')
- smilo-, -smilus: Pronunciation: /smaɪloʊ/, /smaɪləs/. Origin: Ancient Greek σμίλη (smílē). Meaning: a carving knife or chisel. Used for animals with sabre teeth.
  Examples: Smilodon ('knife tooth'); Smilosuchus ('knife crocodile'); Thylacosmilus ('pouched knife'); Xenosmilus ('strange knife')
- spino-, -spino-, -spinax, -spinus: Pronunciation: /spaɪnə/, /spaɪnæks/, /spaɪnəs/. Origin: Latin: spīna. Meaning: a thorn, a spine.
  Examples: Altispinax ('with high spines'); Gigantspinosaurus ('giant-spined lizard'); Iberospinus ('Iberian spine'); Spinops ('spine face'); Spinosaurus ('spine lizard')
- -spondylus: Pronunciation: /spɒndələs/. Origin: Ancient Greek σπόνδυλος (spóndulos). Meaning: vertebra.
  Examples: Streptospondylus ('curved vertebrae'); Massospondylus ('massive vertebrae'); Bothriospondylus ('excavated vertebrae')
- squali-, squalo-: Pronunciation: /skweɪlɪ/, /skweɪloʊ/ . Origin: Latin squalus. Meaning: a kind of sea fish. Used for shark-like creatures.
  Examples: Squalodon ('shark tooth'); Squaliformes ('shark form'); Squalicorax ('shark raven'); Squalomorphi ('shark shape')
- stego-, -stega: Pronunciation: /stɛgoʊ/, /stɛgə/. Origin: Ancient Greek στέγη (stégē). Meaning: roof. Used for armoured or plated animals.
  Examples: Stegosaurus ('roofed lizard'); Ichthyostega ('roofed fish'); Acanthostega ('spine roof')
- strepto-: Pronunciation: /streptoʊ/, /strepto/. Origin: Ancient Greek στρεπτός (streptós). Meaning: twisted, bent.
  Examples: Streptophyta ('twisted plant'); Streptococcus ('twisted granule'); Streptospondylus ('twisted vertebrae'); Streptomyces ('twisted fungus'); Streptocarpus ('twisted fruit')
- -stoma, -stome, -stomus: Pronunciation: /stoʊma/, /stoʊm/, /stoʊməs/. Origin: Ancient Greek στόμα (stóma). Meaning: mouth.
  Examples: Deuterostomia ('second mouth'); Gnathostoma ('jaw mouth'); Anastomus ('on mouth'); Cyclostomi ('circle mouth'); Aulostomus ('flute mouth')
- sucho-, -suchus: Pronunciation: /sjuːkoʊ/, /sjuːkəs/. Origin: Ancient Greek σούχος (soúkhos). Meaning:: Originally the Ancient Greek name for the Ancient Egyptian crocodile-headed god, Sobek. Used to denote crocodilians or crocodile-like animals.
  Examples: Deinosuchus ('terrible crocodile'); Anatosuchus ('duck crocodile'); Suchomimus ('crocodile mimic'); Sarcosuchus ('flesh crocodile'); Thalattosuchus ('sea crocodile'); Pseudosuchia ('false crocodile')
- tauro-: /taərəs/. Origin: Latin: taurus. Meaning: bull.
  Examples: Taurotragus ('male goat-bull'); Taurovenator ('bull hunter'); Carnotaurus ('meat bull')
- Terato- : Pronunciation: /tɛrətoʊ/. Origin: Ancient Greek τευθίς ( tératos ). Meaning: monster. Examples Teratophoneus ( monstrous murderer ) Teratosaurus (monster lizard)
- -teuthis: Pronunciation: /tjuːθɪs/. Origin: Ancient Greek τευθίς (teuthís). Meaning: squid. Used for squids and similar cephalopods.
  Examples: Gonioteuthis ('narrow squid'); Architeuthis ('ruling squid'); Vampyroteuthis ('vampire squid'); Cylindroteuthis ('cylindrical squid'); Opisthoteuthis ('back squid')
- thalatto-. Pronunciation: /θəlatoʊ/. Origin: Ancient Greek θᾰ́λᾰττᾰ (thálatta). Meaning: sea.
  Examples: Thalattosaurus ('sea lizard'); Thalattoarchon ('sea ruler'); Thalattosuchus ('sea crocodile'); Thalattorhynchus ('sea snout')
- thero-, -therium. Pronunciation: /θɛroʊ/, /θiːrɪəm/. Origin: Ancient Greek θηρίον (theríon). Meaning: beast. Used for supposedly monstrous animals. The suffix '-therium' is often used to denote extinct mammals.
  Examples: Theropoda ('beast foot'), Deinotherium ('terrible beast'); Megatherium ('big beast'); Brontotherium ('thunder beast'); Uintatherium ('beast from the Uinta Mountains'); Anthracotherium ('coal beast'); Nototherium ('southern beast'); Arsinoitherium ('beast of Arsinoe II'); Elasmotherium ('plated beast'); Chalicotherium ('gravel beast'); Paraceratherium ('near hornless beast'); Aceratherium ('hornless beast'); Ceratotherium ('horned beast'); Boreoeutheria ('true northern beast'); Pyrotherium ('fire beast')
- thylac-: Pronunciation: /θaɪlæk/. Origin: Ancient Greek θύλακος (thúlakos). Meaning: a sack. In the sense of 'pouch', used for marsupials.
  Examples: Thylacine ('pouched one'); Thylacoleo ('pouched lion'); Thylacosmilus ('pouched knife'); Thylacocephala ('pouch head')
- tri-: Pronunciation: /traɪ/. Origin: Ancient Greek τρία (tría). Meaning: three.
  Examples: Triceratops ('three-horned face'); Triconodon ('three coned teeth'); Trilobita ('three lobes'); Triops ('three eyes'); Triacanthus ('three spine'); Trilobozoa ('three-lobed animals')
- titano-, -titan: Pronunciation: /taɪtænoʊ/, /taɪtən/. Origin: Ancient Greek Τιτάν, Τιτᾶνος (Titán, Titânos). Meaning: Titan, of the Titan, respectively. Used for large animals.
  Examples: Titanosaurus ('Titan lizard'); Giraffatitan ('giraffe Titan'); Anatotitan ('duck Titan'); Titanotherium ('Titan beast'); Titanoboa ('Titan boa'); Titanomyrma ('Titan ant'); Titanoceratops ('Titan horned face'); Titanoptera ('Titan wing'); Ichthyotitan ('fish Titan')
- tyranno-, -tyrannus: Pronunciation: /taɪrænoʊ/, /taɪrænəs/. Origin: Ancient Greek τύραννος (túrannos). Meaning: tyrant. Used for both large theropods (most commonly Tyrannosaurs), and species that possess generally impressive or sharp qualities.
  Examples: Zhuchengtyrannus ('tyrant from Zhucheng'); Tyrannosaurus ('tyrant lizard'); Nanotyrannus ('dwarf tyrant'); Tyrannotitan ('Titanic tyrant'); Sinotyrannus ('Chinese tyrant'); Suskityrannus ('coyote tyrant'); Eotyrannus ('dawn tyrant') Tyrannasorus rex ( 'tyranical pile king' ) Tyrannosorus pinicola ( 'tyranical hump pine' )
- -urus, -uro-: Pronunciation: /uːrəs/, /uːroʊ/. Origin: Ancient Greek: οὐρά (ourá). Meaning: tail.
  Examples: Dasyurus ('hairy tail'); Coelurosauria ('hollow tail lizards'); Uromastyx ('tail scourge'); Ophiura ('snake tail'); Anurognathus ('tailless jaw'); Brachyura ('short tail'); Anura ('tailless'); Uroplatus ('flat tail'); Urodela ('conspicuous tail'); Xiphosura ('sword tail'); Uropoda ('tail foot')
- veloci-: Pronunciation: /vəlɑsɪ/. Origin: Latin velox. Meaning: speed.
  Example: Velociraptor ('speedy thief'); Velocisaurus ('speedy lizard')
- -venator: Pronunciation: /vɛnətər/. Origin: Latin venator. Meaning: hunter.
  Examples: Afrovenator ('African hunter'); Juravenator ('hunter from the Jura Mountains'); Scorpiovenator ('scorpion hunter'); Neovenator ('new hunter'); Concavenator ('hunter from Cuenca'); Taurovenator ('bull hunter'); Ichthyovenator ('fish hunter')
- xeno-: Pronunciation: /zinoʊ/. Origin: Ancient Greek ξένος (xénos). Meaning: strange, stranger. Used for organisms that exhibit unusual traits for their class.
  Examples: Xenosmilus ('strange knife'); Xenotarsosaurus ('strange ankled lizard'); Xenopsitta ('strange parrot'); Xenocyon ('strange dog'); Xenokeryx ('strange horn'); Xenostega ('strange roof'); Xenozancla ('strange animal'); Xenodermus ('strange skin'); Xenopus ('strange foot'); Xenops ('strange face') Xenomorph (‘strange shape’)
- -zoon, -zoa: Pronunciation: /zoʊɑːn/, /zoʊə/. Origin: Ancient Greek ζῷον (zōion). Meaning: animal. Used for broad categories of animals, or in certain names of animals.
  Examples: Metazoa ('encompassing animals'); Parazoa ('near animals'); Ecdysozoa ('moulting animals'); Yunnanozoon ('animal from Yunnan'); Yuyuanozoon ('animal from Yu Yuan'); Hydrozoa ('water animals'); Spermatozoon ('seed animal'); Echinozoa ('hedgehog animals'); Asterozoa ('star animals'); Trilobozoa ('three-lobed animals'); Placozoa ('plate animals'); Amoebozoa ('amoeba animals')

== See also ==
- List of Latin and Greek words commonly used in systematic names
- List of Greek and Latin roots in English
- List of Latin words with English derivatives
- List of medical roots, suffixes and prefixes
