= Pachyrhinus ferrugineus =

Scientific classification
- Kingdom: Animalia
- Phylum: Arthropoda
- Class: Insecta
- Order: Coleoptera
- Suborder: Polyphaga
- Infraorder: Cucujiformia
- Family: Curculionidae
- Genus: Pachyrhinus
- Species: P. ferrugineus

Binomial name
- Pachyrhinus ferrugineus (Casey, 1888)

Species of beetle

Pachyrhinus ferrugineus is a species of broad-nosed weevil in the beetle family Curculionidae. It is found in North America.
