= Pachyrhinus californicus =

Scientific classification
- Domain: Eukaryota
- Kingdom: Animalia
- Phylum: Arthropoda
- Class: Insecta
- Order: Coleoptera
- Suborder: Polyphaga
- Infraorder: Cucujiformia
- Family: Curculionidae
- Genus: Pachyrhinus
- Species: P. californicus

Binomial name
- Pachyrhinus californicus (Horn, 1876)

Species of beetle

Pachyrhinus californicus, the rusty pineneedle weevil, is a species of broad-nosed weevil in the beetle family Curculionidae. It is found in North America.
