= Choeroichthys latispinosus =

Conservation status
- Data Deficient (IUCN 3.1)

Scientific classification
- Kingdom: Animalia
- Phylum: Chordata
- Class: Actinopterygii
- Order: Syngnathiformes
- Family: Syngnathidae
- Genus: Choeroichthys
- Species: C. latispinosus

Binomial name
- Choeroichthys latispinosus C. E. Dawson, 1978

Species of fish

Choeroichthys latispinosus, also known as the Muiron Island pipefish or Muiron pipefish, is a species of pipefish native to the western coast of Western Australia, named for its recorded sighting on South Murion Island. It is thought to inhabit the area from Port Denison to Brecknock Island in the eastern Kimberley region.

Described by Charles Dawson based on a single specimen in 1978, the species is still known from only three localities and very few specimens.

== Description ==
The holotype, a female, measures 27.5 mm (1.08 in) SL. Ground colour is dark brown; there are pale white blotches and mottling. Dorsal fin is narrowly edged with black or brown. The snout has a protruding, spinous lateral ridge, to which its specific name latispinosus refers: it is derived from the Latin latus (side) and spinosus (thorny). The dorsal fin has 22 rays, the pectoral fin has 20, the anal fin 4 and the caudal fin has 10. There are 19 trunk rings and 20 tail rings. It grows to a length of 50 millimetres (2.0 in) in total length.

== Distribution ==
C. latispinosus is endemic to the coastal waters of Western Australia from Port Denison to Brecknock Island in the east Kimberley.

== Reproduction ==
Along with other members of its genus, males of this species brood the young in a simple pouch beneath their trunk or midsection. Females transfer eggs to the male, and he broods them until they hatch and then gives birth to live young.

== Habitat and diet ==
The species inhabits coastal coral reefs, and is thought to feed on small planktonic crustaceans such as copepods and isopods, as is exhibited by other more well-known syngnathid fishes.

== Conservation ==
Choeroichthys latispinosus is listed as Data Deficient on the IUCN's Red List of Threatened Species. The major threat to this species is the loss and degradation of its coral reef habitat. Further research is required in order to understand the species full range, ecology, abundance, and trend in population size. It is a listed marine species under Australia's Environment Protection and Biodiversity Conservation Act 1999.
