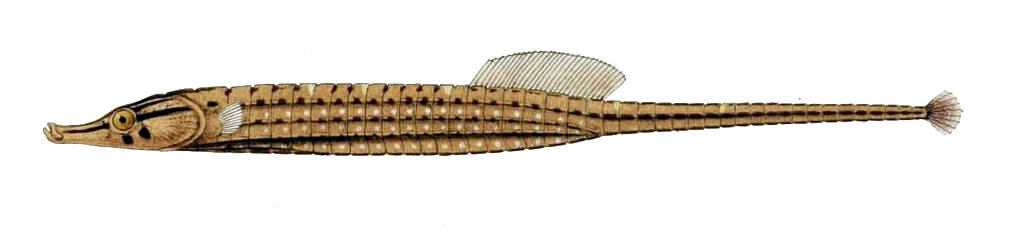

Conservation status
- Least Concern (IUCN 3.1)

Scientific classification
- Kingdom: Animalia
- Phylum: Chordata
- Class: Actinopterygii
- Order: Syngnathiformes
- Family: Syngnathidae
- Genus: Choeroichthys
- Species: C. sculptus

Binomial name
- Choeroichthys sculptus Günther, 1870

Synonyms
- Doryichthys sculptus Günther, 1870; Doryrhamphus macgregori Jordan & Richardson, 1908; Microphis ocellatus Snyder, 1909

= Choeroichthys sculptus =

Sculptured pipefish

Species of fish

Choeroichthys sculptus, the sculptured pipefish, is a species of marine fish of the family Syngnathidae.

== Description ==
Choeroichthys sculptus is a small secretive species with a short snout, and with body and tail sections which are approximately equal in length. C. sculptus is dark brown in colour with 2–3 rows of black-margined white spots along its sides with larger white spots along its back and dark spots situated on the lower part of and on either side of the head. The trunk and tail rings show notches between the rings with conspicuous scutella each of which has a projecting ridge or keel. They can grow to lengths of 8.5 centimetres (3.3 in).

== Distribution ==
Choeroichthys sculptus is widely distributed in the Indo-Pacific from the South China Sea, southern Japan, the Northern Mariana Islands, to Samoa. In Australia it is known only from northern Western Australia and the Great Barrier Reef

== Habitat and biology ==
Choeroichthys sculptus is thought to feed mainly on small crustaceans. They are solitary, the sexes are separate and males brood the eggs in an enclosed brood pouch on underside of his body, i.e. this species is ovoviviparous, eventually the eggs hatch and the male gives birth to live young. The female usually lays the eggs in a single layer of two parallel rows within the brood pouch. The males may be brooding at 4.5 centimetres (1.8 in) in length. The larvae are undescribed. It inhabits coral reef flats, mangroves, and seagrass beds.

== Naming ==
The generic name "Choeroichthys" is derived from the Greek choiros meaning "pig" and ichthys meaning "fish", the specific name sculptus means "to carve" in Latin and refers to the conspicuous keeled scutella.
