= Choeroichthys suillus =

Pigsnout pipefish

Conservation status
- Least Concern (IUCN 3.1)

Scientific classification
- Kingdom: Animalia
- Phylum: Chordata
- Class: Actinopterygii
- Order: Syngnathiformes
- Family: Syngnathidae
- Genus: Choeroichthys
- Species: C. suillus

Binomial name
- Choeroichthys suillus Whitley, 1951

Species of fish

Choeroichthys suillus (pigsnout pipefish or barred short-bodied pipefish) is a species of marine fish of the family Syngnathidae. It is endemic to Australia, occurring from Perth, along northern Australia, to southern Queensland. It lives in coral reefs to a depth of 14 metres (46 ft), where it can grow to lengths of 6 centimetres (2.4 in). This species is ovoviviparous, with males carrying eggs and giving birth to live young. Within the reef it is found among coral rubble.
