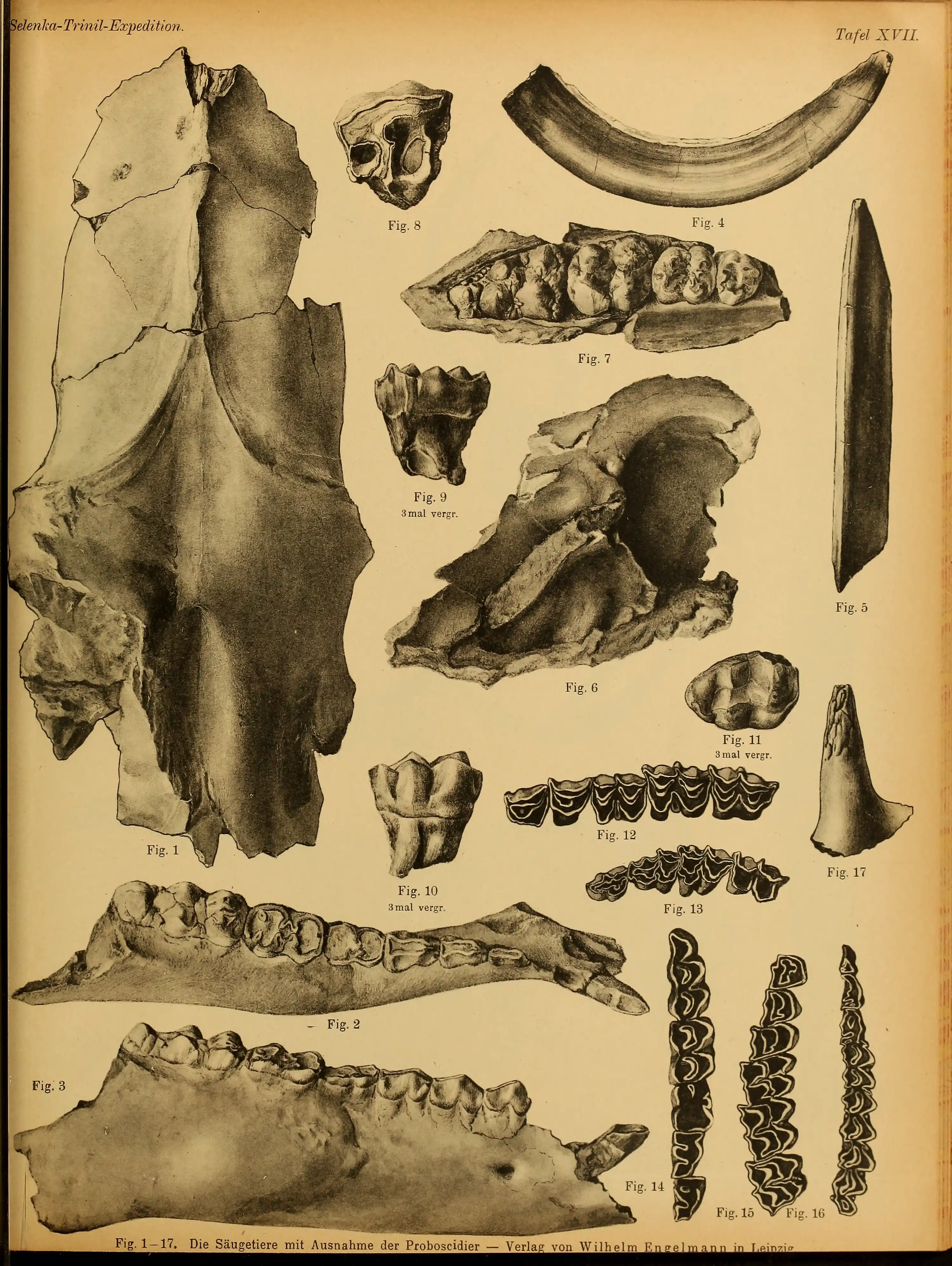
- Holotype skull (1) viewed from above

Scientific classification
- Kingdom: Animalia
- Phylum: Chordata
- Class: Mammalia
- Order: Carnivora
- Family: Felidae
- Subfamily: Pantherinae
- Genus: †Feliopsis; Stremme, 1911

Type species
- †Feliopsis palaeojavanica Stremme, 1911

Other species
- †Feliopsis piriyai? (de Bonis et al., 2023)

Synonyms
- Pachypanthera piriyai? de Bonis et al., 2023

= Feliopsis =

Feliopsis Temporal range: Pleistocene, 0.83–0.38 Ma

Extinct genus of felid

Feliopsis is an extinct genus of pantherine felid known from the Pleistocene of Java. The type species, Feliopsis palaeojavanica, was named in 1911 based on a partial skull. Although traditionally interpreted a fossil specimen of the tiger for over 90 years, Feliopsis has subsequently been reconsidered as a separate genus of pantherine. It has also been suggested that Pachypanthera may possibly represent a second species, Feliopsis piriyai.

== Discovery and naming ==
The Trinil Site in Java, Indonesia is dated between the latest Early Pleistocene and Middle Pleistocene. The lower rock layers are dated between 830,000 and 770,000 years ago, while the upper rock layers are dated between 560,000 and 380,000 years ago. The team of fossil collectors led by the German anthropologist Margarethe Selenka found remains of various Pleistocene fauna from the Trinil Site between 1906 and 1908. In 1911, German geologist Hermann Stremme scientifically described the skull of a large felid discovered from this excavation as the holotype of a new genus and species, Feliopsis palaeojavanica.

The type specimen was later accessioned in the Natural History Museum of Humboldt University in Berlin, Germany under specimen number NKHUB 30002. In 1933, German-Dutch researcher Gustav Heinrich Ralph von Koenigswald considered Feliopsis a synonym (the same taxon) of the tiger. In 1935, Dutch researcher L. D. Brongersma supported Koenigswald's conclusions, and subsequent studies followed this interpretation. This synonymy was based on comparable tooth characteristics between the two taxa. Contrary to his agreement with the synonymy in 1971, the German researcher Helmut Hemmer proposed in 2026 that Feliopsis is a valid taxon based on its exceptionally deep mandible (lower jaw), elongated premaxilla (frontmost upper jaw bone), and enlarged, conical canine teeth compared to Panthera; the premolar four (P4) is also proportionally smaller compared to the carnassial teeth than those of most Panthera species. Furthermore, Hemmer concluded that the extinct pantherine Pachypanthera piriyai from Thailand possibly represents a second species of Feliopsis.
