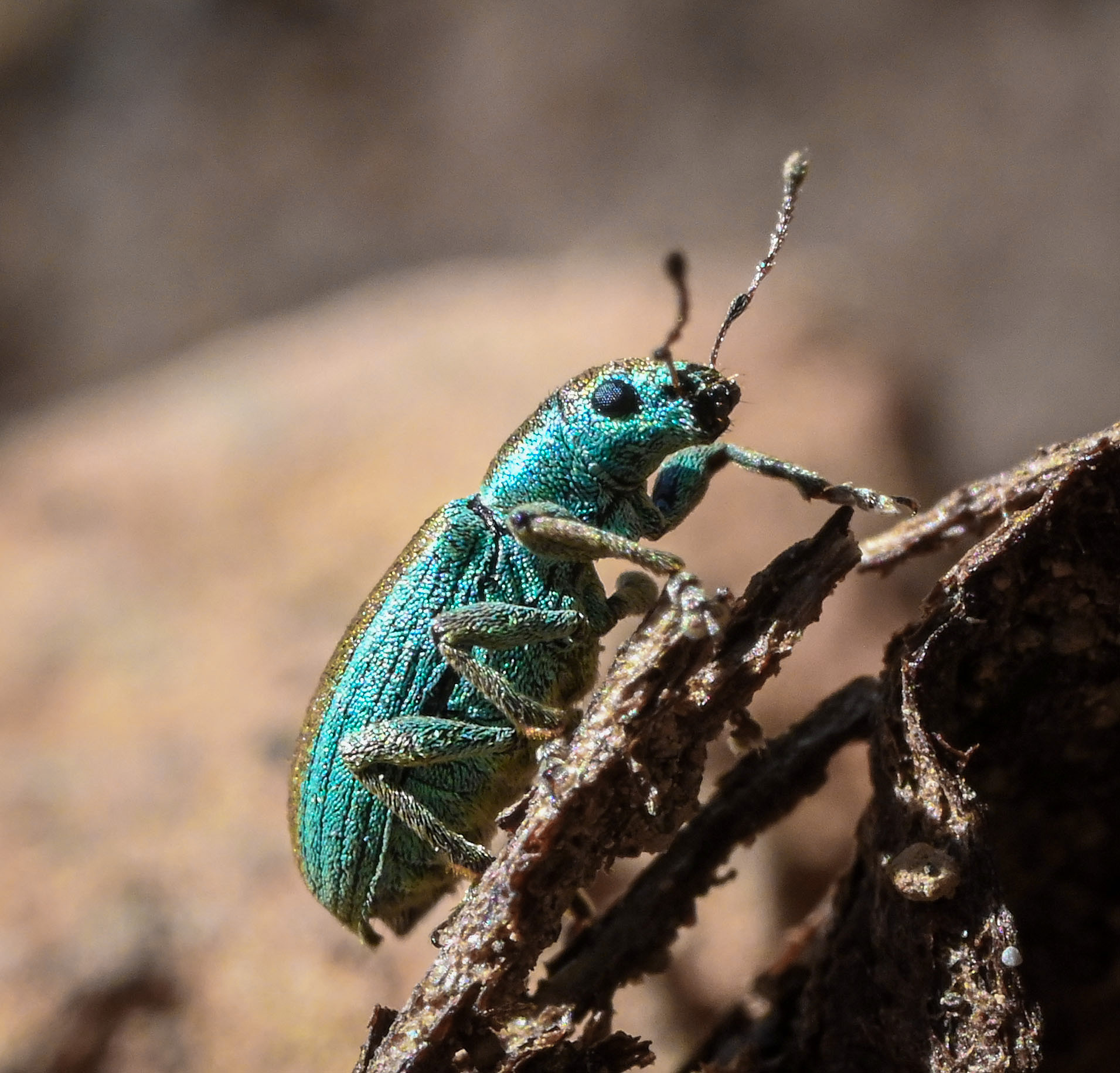

Scientific classification
- Domain: Eukaryota
- Kingdom: Animalia
- Phylum: Arthropoda
- Class: Insecta
- Order: Coleoptera
- Suborder: Polyphaga
- Infraorder: Cucujiformia
- Family: Curculionidae
- Genus: Pachyrhinus
- Species: P. elegans

Binomial name
- Pachyrhinus elegans (Couper, 1865)

= Pachyrhinus elegans =

Species of beetle

Pachyrhinus elegans is a species of broad-nosed weevil in the beetle family Curculionidae. It is found in North America.
