= Anisacanthus brasiliensis =

Scientific classification
- Kingdom: Plantae
- Clade: Tracheophytes
- Clade: Angiosperms
- Clade: Eudicots
- Clade: Asterids
- Order: Lamiales
- Family: Acanthaceae
- Genus: Anisacanthus
- Species: A. brasiliensis

Binomial name
- Anisacanthus brasiliensis Lindau

Species of flowering plant

Anisacanthus brasiliensis is a plant native to the Caatinga vegetation of Brazil.
