= Acanthogeophilus dentifer =

Scientific classification
- Kingdom: Animalia
- Phylum: Arthropoda
- Subphylum: Myriapoda
- Class: Chilopoda
- Order: Geophilomorpha
- Family: Geophilidae
- Genus: Acanthogeophilus
- Species: A. dentifer

Binomial name
- Acanthogeophilus dentifer Minelli, 1982

Species of centipede

Acanthogeophilus dentifer is the type species of the genus Acanthogeophilus found in the Italian peninsula. The original description of this species is based on an adult male specimen measuring 24 mm in length with 67 pairs of legs. This species is characterized by an absence of anterior tubercles on a forcipular coxosternum, smooth internal margin of forcipular tarsungulum, presence of basal tubercle on forcipular tarsungulum, and transversally elongate sternal pores on the posterior area.

== Etymology ==
The genus name Acanthogeophilus comes from Ancient Greek ἄκανθα (ákantha), meaning 'spine', 'thorn', γεω- (geo-), meaning 'earth', and φίλος (phílos), meaning 'lover'. The specific epithet dentifer comes from Latin dens, meaning 'tooth', and -fer, meaning 'bearing'.
