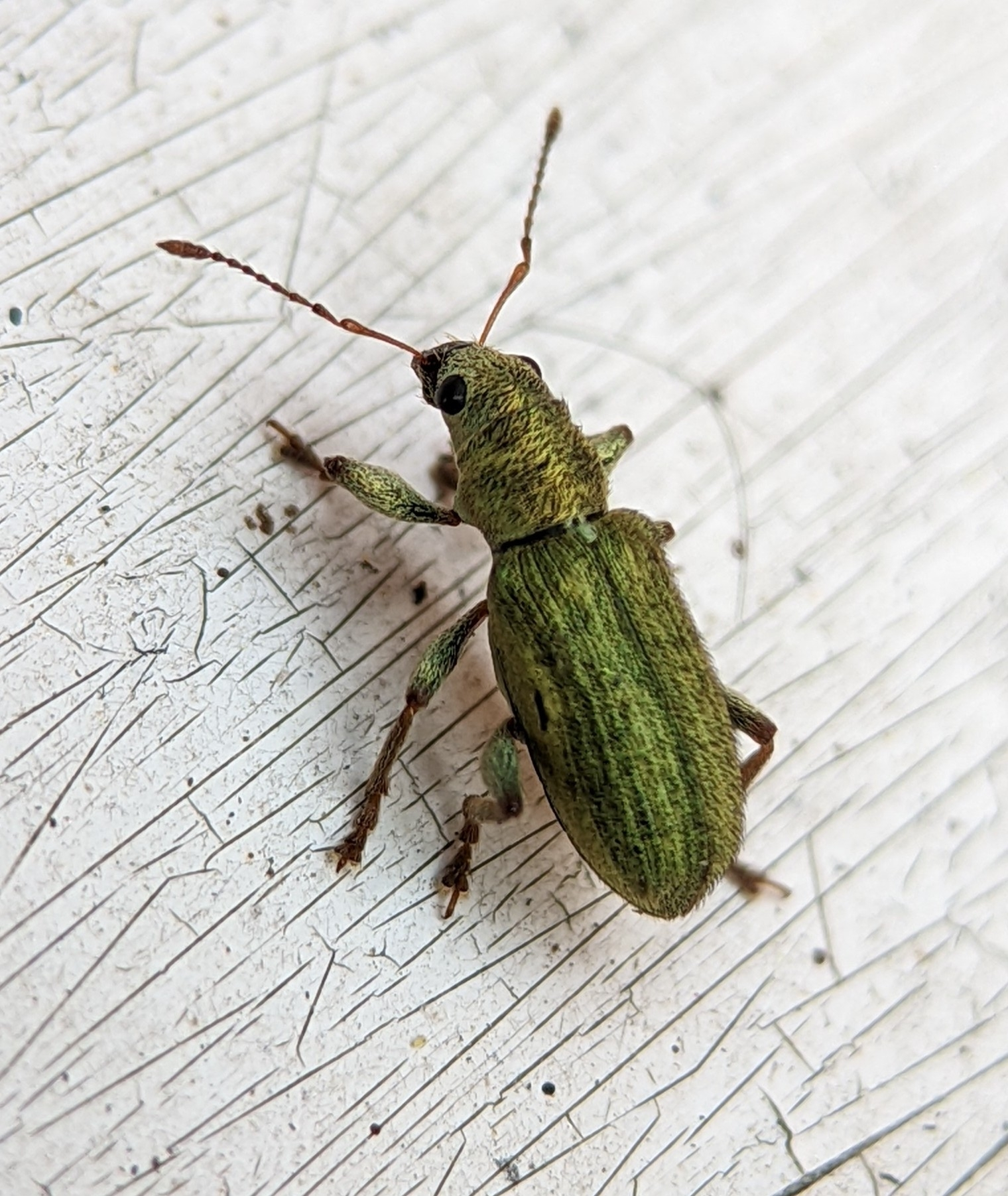

Scientific classification
- Domain: Eukaryota
- Kingdom: Animalia
- Phylum: Arthropoda
- Class: Insecta
- Order: Coleoptera
- Suborder: Polyphaga
- Infraorder: Cucujiformia
- Family: Curculionidae
- Genus: Pachyrhinus
- Species: P. lethierryi

Binomial name
- Pachyrhinus lethierryi (Desbrochers des Loges, 1875)

= Pachyrhinus lethierryi =

Species of beetle

Pachyrhinus lethierryi is a species of beetle from the genus Pachyrhinus.
