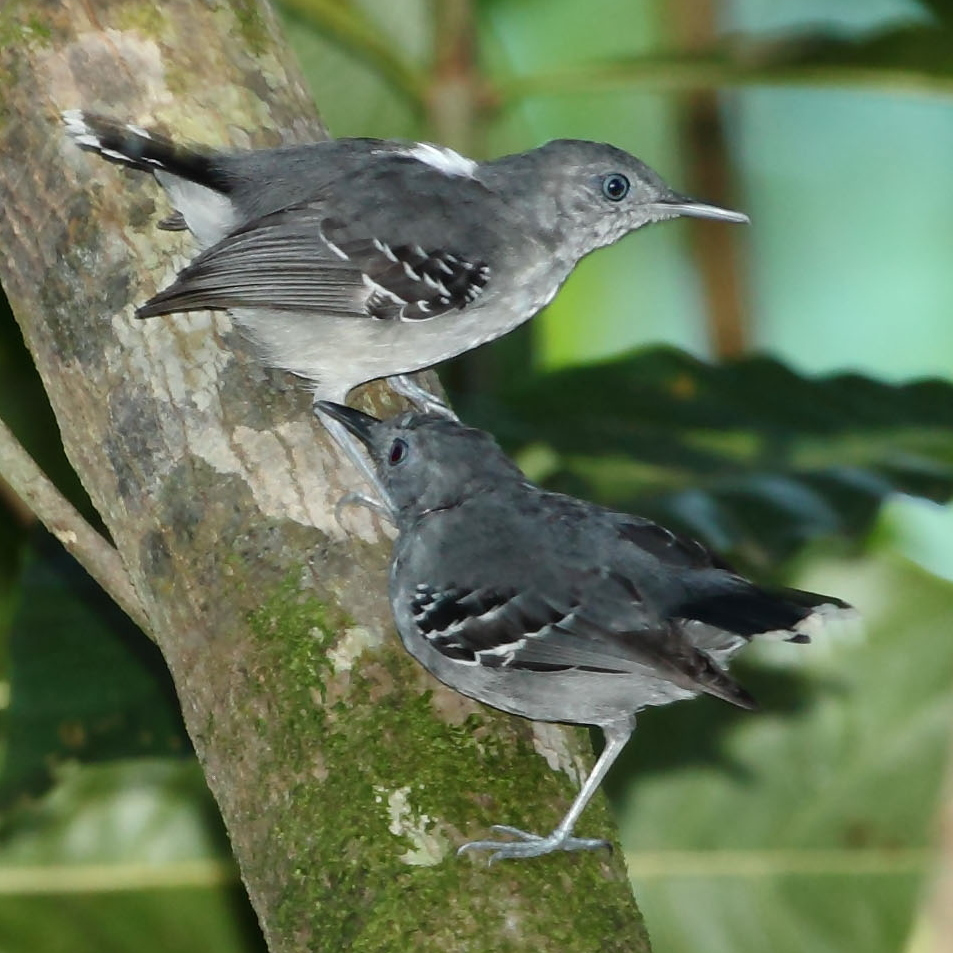
- at Apiacás, Mato Grosso state, Brazil

Conservation status
- Least Concern (IUCN 3.1)

Scientific classification
- Kingdom: Animalia
- Phylum: Chordata
- Class: Aves
- Order: Passeriformes
- Family: Thamnophilidae
- Genus: Hypocnemoides
- Species: H. maculicauda

Binomial name
- Hypocnemoides maculicauda (Pelzeln, 1868)

= Band-tailed antbird =

Species of bird

The band-tailed antbird (Hypocnemoides maculicauda) is a species of bird in subfamily Thamnophilinae of family Thamnophilidae, the "typical antbirds". It is found in Bolivia, Brazil, Colombia, and Peru.

== Taxonomy and systematics ==
The band-tailed antbird was described by the Austrian ornithologist August von Pelzeln in 1868 and given the binomial name Hypocnemis maculicauda.; it was later transferred to genus Hypocnemoides. It shares that genus with the black-chinned antbird (H. melanopogon). However, some authors have said that the "[r]easons for treatment of Hypocnemoides maculicauda as a separate species from H. melanopogon are weak".

The band-tailed antbird is monotypic. One ornithologist proposed that the eastern population be treated as a subspecies H. m. orientalis but later work discounted that treatment.

== Description ==
The band-tailed antbird is about 12 cm (4.7 in) long and weighs 11.5 to 14.5 g (0.41 to 0.51 oz). Adult males have leaden gray upperparts with a large but usually hidden white patch between their scapulars. Their tail is slate gray with wide white feather tips. Their flight feathers are leaden gray with lighter gray edges and their wing coverts are black with gray and white edges. Their throat is black. Their underparts are mostly a paler gray than their upperparts and with a white belly. Adult females have the same leaden upperparts as males. Their throat and most of their underparts are white. Their breast feathers have gray edges. Their sides are gray and the sides of their breast and belly have a very slight buff tinge. Both sexes have a gray iris and blue-gray legs and feet. Males have a black bill; females have a black maxilla and a gray mandible.

== Distribution and habitat ==
Most sources place the band-tailed antbird in the Amazon Basin from eastern Peru east through northern Bolivia and central Brazil to the Atlantic, all south of the Amazon River. However, the South American Classification Committee of the American Ornithological Society includes Colombia in the species' range on the basis of a 2020 publication. Xeno-canto has a single song recording from 2022 in extreme southern Colombia.

The band-tailed antbird inhabits lowland evergreen forest, almost always in várzea forest along larger rivers, along smaller watercourses, and along the edges of lakes. It favors low vegetation that overhangs water.

== Behavior ==
=== Movement ===
The band-tailed antbird is a year-round resident throughout its range.

=== Feeding ===
The band-tailed antbird's diet has not been detailed but is known to be mostly insects. Pairs and family groups forage mostly on the ground and up to about 4 m (13 ft) above it, and almost always near or even over water. They actively hop on the ground and through vine tangles and brush. They capture prey by gleaning and reaching and with short sallies from a perch. They occasionally attend army ant swarms.

=== Breeding ===
Evidence suggests that the band-tailed antbird's breeding season includes August but nothing else is known about the species' breeding biology.

=== Vocalization ===
One description of the band-tailed antbird's song is "an accelerating series of rising, modulated whistles followed by an abruptly decelerating series of rising burry note: hew hew-hu-hu'huHU' DJZE'DJZEE-djzwee djzww djzwee?". Another description is a "strong, accelerating series of loud raspy notes, rising in strength and pitch to a sharp rattle, then falling and decelerating". Its calls include "quiet whiny and chuckling notes, also a descending, slightly hoarse hew and a sneezy tzew".

== Status ==
The IUCN has assessed the band-tailed antbird as being of Least Concern. It has a very large range; its population size is not known and is believed to be decreasing. No immediate threats have been identified. It is considered locally fairly common overall and fairly common in Peru. "Human activity has little direct effect on the Band-tailed Antbird, other than the local effects of habitat destruction."
