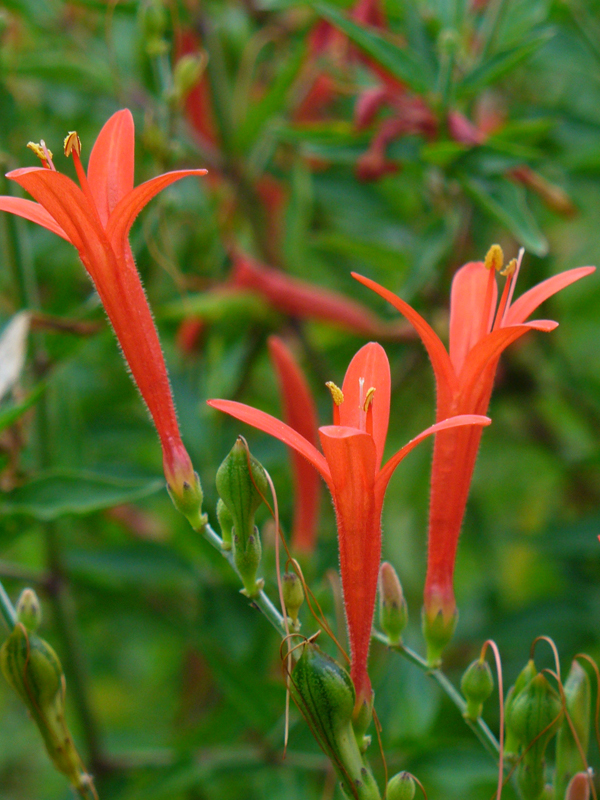
- Anisacanthus quadrifidus

Conservation status
- Apparently Secure (NatureServe)

Scientific classification
- Kingdom: Plantae
- Clade: Embryophytes
- Clade: Tracheophytes
- Clade: Spermatophytes
- Clade: Angiosperms
- Clade: Eudicots
- Clade: Asterids
- Order: Lamiales
- Family: Acanthaceae
- Genus: Anisacanthus
- Species: A. quadrifidus

Binomial name
- Anisacanthus quadrifidus (Vahl) Nees

Synonyms
- Justicia quadrifida Vahl basionym; Anisacanthus virgularis (Salisb.) Nees; Anisacanthus wrightii var. brevilobus S.H.Hagen; Justicia hyssopifolia Gouan ex Nees; Justicia superba Nees; Justicia virgularis Salisb.; var. wrightii (Torr.) Henrickson: Anisacanthus junceus (Torr.) Hemsl.; Anisacanthus wrightii (Torr.) A. Gray; Drejera wrightii Torr.

= Anisacanthus quadrifidus =

Species of flowering plant

Anisacanthus quadrifidus is a species of flowering plant native to west and south-central Texas in the United States and adjacent northern Mexico down through the state of Oaxaca. It is an increasingly common ornamental shrub in Texas and is cultivated in other parts of the Southwestern United States.

== Name ==
It is known by a variety of names including flame acanthus, Wright's desert honeysuckle, hummingbird bush, Wright acanthus, Wright anisacanth, Texas firecracker, Mexican flame and Wright's Mexican flame. "Wright" refers to American botanist Charles Wright who collected samples of the plant in the mid-19th century. Some sources also refer to it as muicle although this name is usually applied to the related Justicia spicigera when used as a traditional medicine in Central America.

== Habitat ==
It is found on rocky and dry slopes, grasslands, xerophytic scrub and Mexican pinyon forests. It is also frequently on crop banks or in sloped arid areas at heights from 1,500 to 2,450 meters (4,920 to 8,040 ft) above sea level. It adapts well to other soils when under cultivation, however, it displays poor tolerance to frost.
