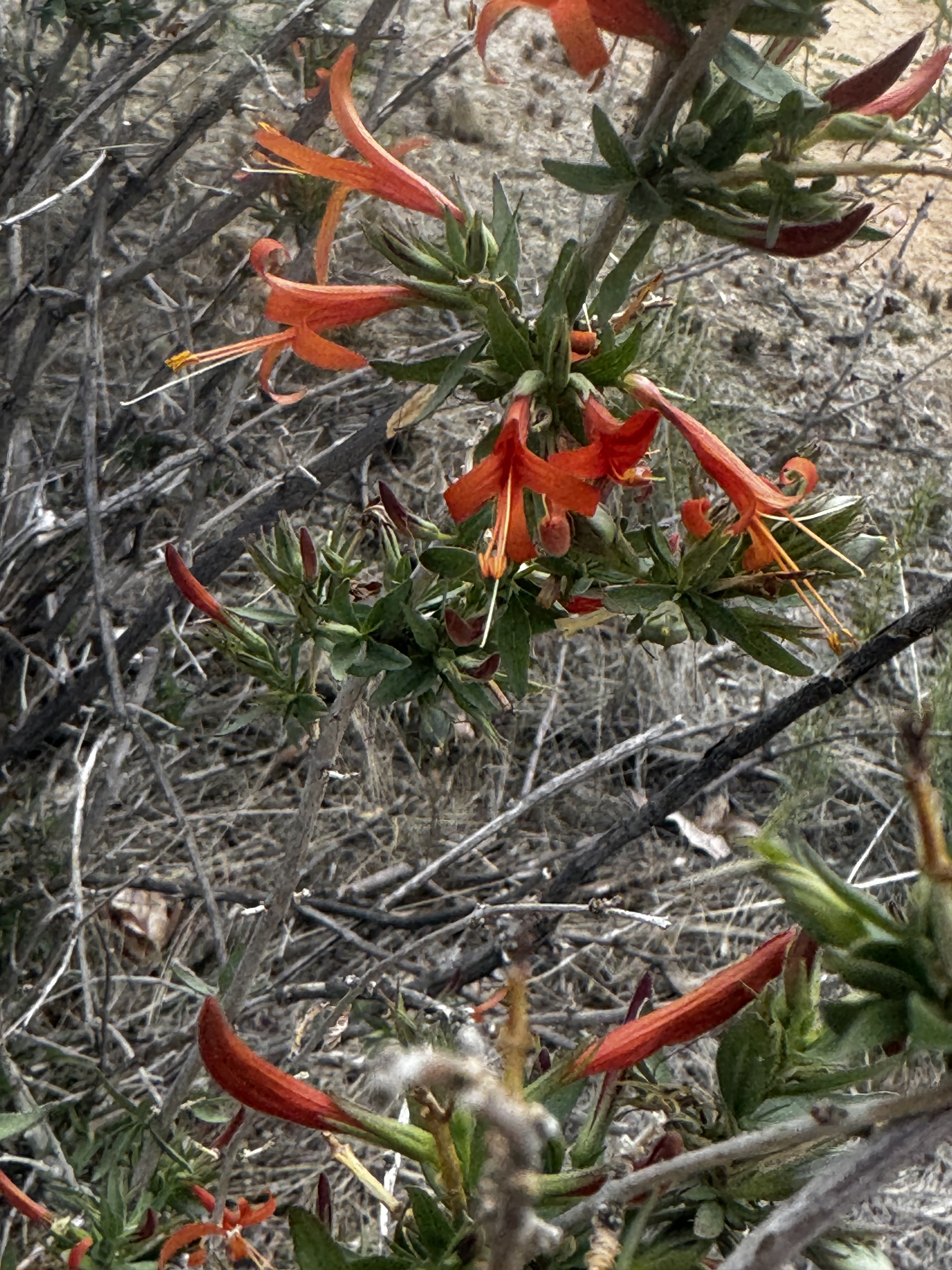

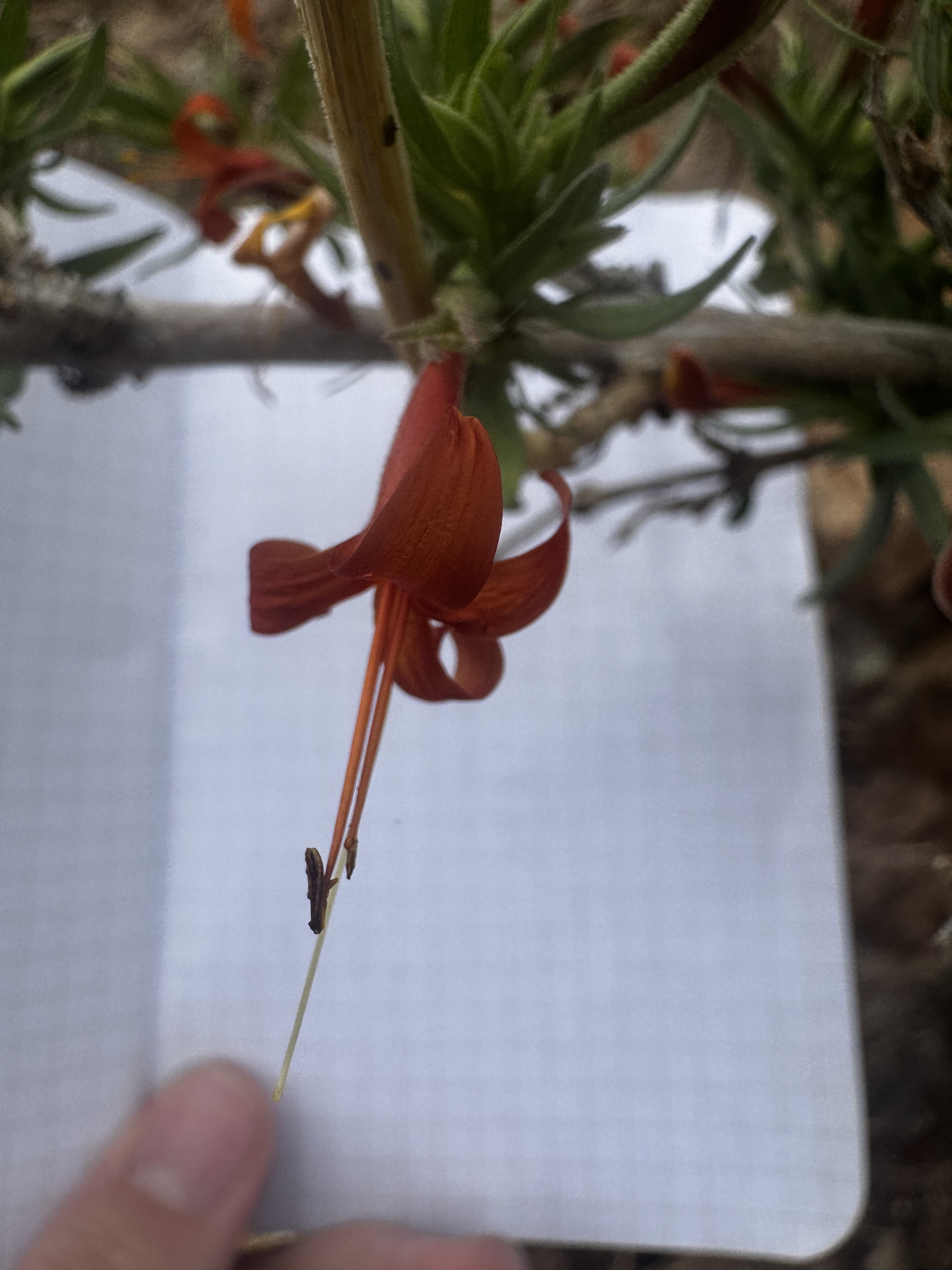

Scientific classification
- Kingdom: Plantae
- Clade: Tracheophytes
- Clade: Angiosperms
- Clade: Eudicots
- Clade: Asterids
- Order: Lamiales
- Family: Acanthaceae
- Genus: Anisacanthus
- Species: A. thurberi

Binomial name
- Anisacanthus thurberi (Torr.) A.Gray

= Anisacanthus thurberi =

Species of flowering plant

Anisacanthus thurberi, also known as Thurber's desert honeysuckle, buckbrush, or desert honeysuckle, is a deciduous species of perennial flowering shrub in the family Acanthaceae. It is native to the Sonoran Desert, and can be found in south and central Arizona, as well as southwest New Mexico.

== Description ==
It is an erect, woody shrub growing between 1 and 2 meters (3 and 7 feet). Its spreading branches are covered in pale bark and clusters of small green leaves that grow 4–6 cm long and 1-1.5 cm wide.

Inflorescences are small groups of conspicuous orange or red flowers that are tubular, 2–3.5 cm long, and have a strap-shaped upper lip with one lobe above and three lobes below. Within the flowers are two long, protruding red stamens capped with yellow anthers and a longer white style.

== Range ==
Relatively rare within the United States, it is native only to Arizona, New Mexico, and northern Mexico. It can be found throughout much of Arizona—predominantly the southern and central parts of the state, in the Sonoran Desert—and the southwestern corner of New Mexico, with large populations also growing in northern Mexico.

== Habitat ==
It is often found growing in shade within gravelly or sandy washes and rocky canyon bottoms at elevations ranging from 610 to 1,524 meters (2,000 to 5,000 feet). It can also be found on canyon walls and rocky desert hillsides.

== Ecology ==
Its tubular flowers with bright petals make Anisacanthus thurberi well-adapted and popular for pollination by hummingbirds. It is also a popular plant for browsing by desert herbivores. The plant primary blooms during the spring, but can bloom throughout the year, given sufficient rainfall.

== Etymology ==
The genus name Anisacanthus is derived from the Greek root "anisos," meaning unequal. The specific epithet thurberi is named in honor of Dr. George Thurber, who was a botanist on the United States and Mexican Boundary Survey from 1850 to 1854.
