= Choeroichthys smithi =

Conservation status
- Least Concern (IUCN 3.1)

Scientific classification
- Kingdom: Animalia
- Phylum: Chordata
- Class: Actinopterygii
- Order: Syngnathiformes
- Family: Syngnathidae
- Genus: Choeroichthys
- Species: C. smithi

Binomial name
- Choeroichthys smithi Dawson, 1976

Species of fish

Choeroichthys smithi (shortfin pipefish, or Smith's short-bodied pipefish) is a species of marine fish of the family Syngnathidae. It is found in the western Indian Ocean along the coasts of Reunion, Mauritius, the Seychelles, Madagascar, Tanzania, Mozambique, and South Africa. It is a demersal species, inhabiting tide pools and reef flats in coastal waters where it can grow to lengths of 5 cm. This species is ovoviviparous, with males carrying the eggs and giving birth to live young. The specific name honours the South African ichthyologist J. L. B. Smith (1897-1968) who collected the material which was used as the holotype by Dawson when he described the species.
