= Acanthogeophilus spiniger =

Scientific classification
- Kingdom: Animalia
- Phylum: Arthropoda
- Subphylum: Myriapoda
- Class: Chilopoda
- Order: Geophilomorpha
- Family: Geophilidae
- Genus: Acanthogeophilus
- Species: A. spiniger

Binomial name
- Acanthogeophilus spiniger (Meinert, 1870)

Centipede

Acanthogeophilus spiniger is a species of soil centipede in the family Geophilidae found in Northwest Africa. The original description of this species is based on a male specimen measuring 27 mm in length with 71 pairs of legs. It was first assigned to the genus Geophilus, but was moved to Acanthogeophilus in 1999 by Foddai and Minelli. Like other species in its genus, it is characterized by incomplete chitin lines, complete coxopleural sutures, stout legs, and a claw-like pretarsus.

== Etymology ==
The genus name Acanthogeophilus comes from Ancient Greek ἄκανθα (ákantha), meaning 'spine', 'thorn', γεω- (geo-), meaning 'earth', and φίλος (phílos), meaning 'lover'. The specific epithet spiniger comes from Latin spina, meaning 'tooth', and -ger, meaning 'bearing'.
