= Choeroichthys cinctus =

Barred shortbody pipefish

Conservation status
- Least Concern (IUCN 3.1)

Scientific classification
- Kingdom: Animalia
- Phylum: Chordata
- Class: Actinopterygii
- Order: Syngnathiformes
- Family: Syngnathidae
- Genus: Choeroichthys
- Species: C. cinctus

Binomial name
- Choeroichthys cinctus Dawson, 1976

Species of fish

Choeroichthys cinctus (barred shortbody pipefish) is a species of marine fish of the family Syngnathidae. It is found in the Western Pacific Ocean, from Indonesia and the Philippines to Samoa, where it usually inhabits sheltered reef habitats at depths over 10 metres (33 ft). It can grow to lengths of 10 centimetres (3.9 in). This species is ovoviviparous, with males carrying eggs in a brood pouch until giving birth to live young. Males may brood at 3 centimetres (1.2 in).
