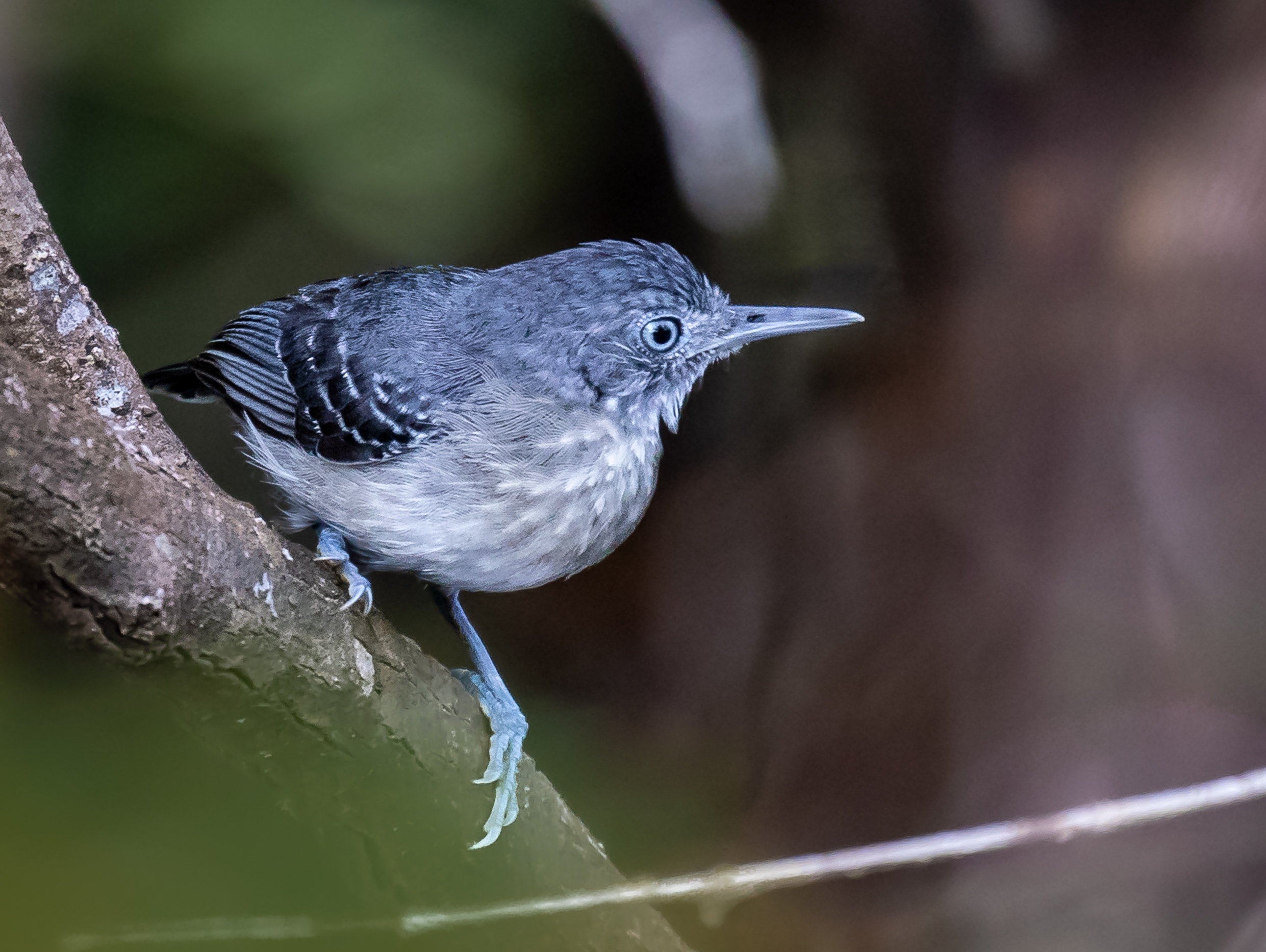
- Female at Anavilhanas National Park, Novo Airão, Amazonas, Brazil

Conservation status
- Least Concern (IUCN 3.1)

Scientific classification
- Kingdom: Animalia
- Phylum: Chordata
- Class: Aves
- Order: Passeriformes
- Family: Thamnophilidae
- Genus: Hypocnemoides
- Species: H. melanopogon

Binomial name
- Hypocnemoides melanopogon (Sclater, PL, 1857)

= Black-chinned antbird =

Species of bird

The black-chinned antbird (Hypocnemoides melanopogon) is a species of bird in subfamily Thamnophilinae of family Thamnophilidae, the "typical antbirds". It is found in Brazil, Colombia, Ecuador, French Guiana, Guyana, Peru, Suriname, and Venezuela.

== Taxonomy and systematics ==
The black-chinned antbird was described by the English zoologist Philip Sclater in 1857 and given the binomial name Hypocnemis melanopogon; it was later transferred to genus Hypocnemoides. It shares that genus with the band-tailed antbird (H. maculicauda). However, some authors have said that the "[r]easons for treatment of Hypocnemoides maculicauda as a separate species from H. melanopogon are weak".

The further taxonomy of the black-chinned antbird is unsettled. The International Ornithological Congress (IOC) assigns it three subspecies, the nominate H. m. melanopogon (Sclater, PL, 1857), H. m. minor (Gyldenstolpe, 1941), and H. m. occidentalis (Zimmer, JT, 1932). The Clements taxonomy and BirdLife International's Handbook of the Birds of the World do not recognize occidentalis, including it within the nominate.

This article generally follows the two-subspecies model because the range demarcation and plumage differences between the nominate melanopogon and occidentalis are not clear.

== Description ==
The black-chinned antbird is 11 to 12.2 cm (4.3 to 4.8 in) long and weighs about 12 to 18 g (0.42 to 0.63 oz). Adult males have leaden gray upperparts. Their tail is slate gray with narrow white feather tips. Their flight feathers are leaden gray with lighter gray edges and their wing coverts are black with gray and white edges. Their throat is black. Their underparts are mostly a paler gray than their upperparts and with a grayish white belly. Adult females have the same leaden upperparts as males. Their throat is whitish with black and gray speckles. Their breast is mottled with gray and white and an olive gray tinge. Their sides and flanks are grayer than their breast, and their belly and undertail coverts are gray tinged with buff. Both sexes have a gray iris and blue-gray legs and feet. Males have a black bill; females have a black maxilla and a gray mandible. Subspecies H. m. melanopogon sensu lato and H. m. minor have essentially the same plumage. The putative subspecies H. m. occidentalis is described as having a smaller black throat patch and paler underparts with more gray spotting than H. m. melanopogon sensu stricto.

== Distribution and habitat ==
Under the two-subspecies model, the nominate black-chinned antbird is found from eastern Colombia east through southern and eastern Venezuela and the Guianas to the Atlantic in northeastern Brazil and south into far northeastern Ecuador, northeastern Peru, and Brazil north of the Amazon. The IOC places occidentalis in "Colombia, Venezuela and nw Brazil", melanopogon in "the Guianas and n Brazil", and makes no mention of Ecuador or Peru. Hilty places occidentalis in southwestern Venezuela and melanopogon in northeastern and east-central Venezuela. He notes that the species' range extends into Colombia, Ecuador, Peru, the Guianas, and Brazil without differentiating which subspecies is where. All relevant sources agree that subspecies H. m. minor is found in south-central Amazonian Brazil south of the Amazon between the Purus and Tocantins rivers.

The black-chinned antbird inhabits lowland evergreen forest, almost always in várzea forest along larger rivers, along smaller watercourses, and along the edges of lakes. It favors low vegetation that overhangs water. In elevation it reaches 450 m (1,500 ft) in Venezuela, 500 m (1,600 ft) in Colombia, and 200 m (700 ft) in Ecuador.

== Behavior ==
=== Movement ===
The black-chinned antbird is a year-round resident throughout its range.

=== Feeding ===
The black-chinned antbird's diet has not been detailed but is known to be mostly insects and to include spiders. Pairs and family groups forage mostly on the ground and up to about 2 m (7 ft) above it, and almost always near or even over water. They actively hop on the ground and through vine tangles and brush. They capture prey by gleaning and reaching and with short sallies from a perch. They occasionally attend army ant swarms.

=== Breeding ===
The black-chinned antbird's breeding season has not been defined but appears to include at least March to July. Its nest is a pouch loosely woven from thin roots and hanging from a branch near or over water. The clutch is two eggs; they are dark cream with dark spots and marbling. The incubation period, time to fledging, and details of parental care are not known.

=== Vocalization ===
One description of the black-chinned antbird's song is "an accelerating, rising series of modulated, rising whistles that descends slightly at the end with much more buzzy notes: whee wee-wee'wee'wi'wi'wiwiwidz'dz'dzee". Another description is a "series of 8-12 high, accentuated 'few' notes, 1st 2-3 evenly-spaced and rising, then as 'djew' notes accelerating and bouncing down". Its calls include "a sneezy tzeew and a descending, whistled hew".

== Status ==
The IUCN has assessed the black-chinned antbird as being of Least Concern. It has a very large range; its population size is not known and is believed to be stable. No immediate threats have been identified. It is considered local or fairly common in different parts of Venezuela, fairly common in Colombia and Peru, and locally fairly common in Ecuador. "Human activity has little direct effect on the Black-chinned Antbird, other than the local effects of habitat destruction."
