= Megaloceras =

Megaloceras Temporal range: Silurian

Scientific classification
- Kingdom: Animalia
- Phylum: Mollusca
- Class: Cephalopoda
- Subclass: Nautiloidea
- Order: †Oncocerida
- Family: †Karoceratidae
- Genus: †Megaloceras; Zhuravleva, 1974

Extinct genus of molluscs

Megaloceras is a genus of the nautiloid order Oncocerida that lived during the Silurian period of the Paleozoic. It is included in the family Karoceratidae, characterized by compressed straight or exogastricly curved shells with slender ventral siphuncles.
