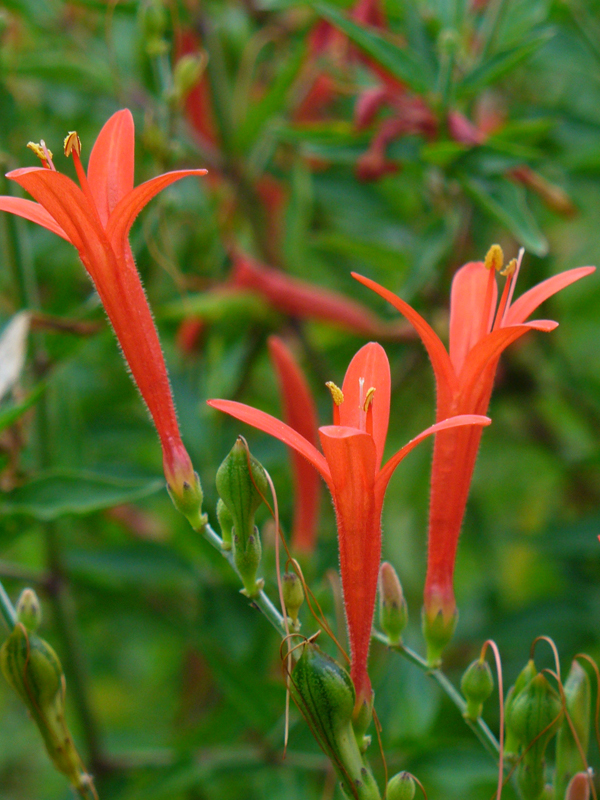
- Anisacanthus quadrifidus

Scientific classification
- Kingdom: Plantae
- Clade: Tracheophytes
- Clade: Angiosperms
- Clade: Eudicots
- Clade: Asterids
- Order: Lamiales
- Family: Acanthaceae
- Tribe: Justicieae
- Genus: Anisacanthus; Nees

Species
- 11; see text

Synonyms
- Birnbaumia Kostel. (1844); Idanthisa Raf. (1840)

= Anisacanthus =

Genus of flowering plants

Anisacanthus is a genus of flowering plants in the bear's breeches family, Acanthaceae. The generic name is derived from the Greek words ἄνισος (ánisos), meaning "unequal," and ἄκανθος (ákanthos), meaning "spine, thorn." Members of the genus are native to tropical and subtropical regions of the Americas. They are commonly known as desert honeysuckles, though this term is shared with the genus Ancistranthus, and is something of a misnomer as true honeysuckles (genus Lonicera) belong to the family Caprifoliaceae. Anisacanthus species are sometimes cultivated for use in xeriscaping.

== Species ==
Eleven species are accepted.

- Anisacanthus andersonii T.F.Daniel – Big desert honeysuckle, limita
- Anisacanthus brasiliensis Lindau
- Anisacanthus grace-woodiae Hammel & McDade, sp. nov.
- Anisacanthus linearis (S.H.Hagen) Henrickson & E.J.Lott – Narrowleaf desert honeysuckle, dwarf anisacanthus
- Anisacanthus nicaraguensis L.H. Durkee
- Anisacanthus puberulus (Torr.) Henrickson & E.J.Lott – Dwarf desert honeysuckle, pinky anisacanthus
- Anisacanthus pumilus Nees
- Anisacanthus quadrifidus (Vahl) Nees – Wright's desert honeysuckle, flame anisacanthus
- Anisacanthus tetracaulis Leonard
- Anisacanthus thurberi (Torr.) A.Gray – Thurber's desert honeysuckle
- Anisacanthus tulensis Greenm.
