= Acanthoceras =

Acanthoceras may refer to:

- Acanthoceras (diatom), a genus of alga
- Acanthoceras (ammonite), extinct cephalopod genus that lived in the Late Cretaceous
