= Orthopus =

Scientific classification
- Kingdom: Animalia
- Phylum: Chordata
- Clade: Synapsida
- Genus: †Orthopus; Kutorga, 1838

Extinct genus of synapsids

Orthopus, from Ancient Greek ὀρθός (orthós), meaning "straight", and πούς (poús), meaning "foot", is an extinct genus of non-mammalian synapsids. It is based on a partial humerus that closely resembles Estemmenosuchus, in the limited comparisons possible.

== See also ==
- List of therapsids
