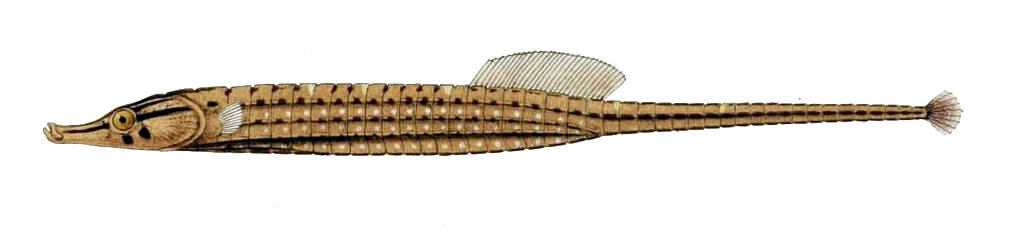
- Sculptured Pipefish (C. sculptus)

Scientific classification
- Kingdom: Animalia
- Phylum: Chordata
- Class: Actinopterygii
- Order: Syngnathiformes
- Family: Syngnathidae
- Subfamily: Nerophinae
- Genus: Choeroichthys; Kaup, 1856

Type species
- Choeroichthys valencienni (Kaup, 1856)

= Choeroichthys =

Genus of fishes

Choeroichthys (from Ancient Greek χοῖρος (khoîros), meaning "pig", and ἰχθύς (ikhthús), meaning "fish", and thus, "pig fish") is a genus of pipefishes of the family Syngnathidae native to the Indian and Pacific Oceans.

== Species ==
There are currently six recognized species in this genus:

- Choeroichthys brachysoma (Bleeker, 1855) (Short-bodied pipefish)
- Choeroichthys cinctus C. E. Dawson, 1976 (Barred shortbody pipefish)
- Choeroichthys latispinosus C. E. Dawson, 1978 (Muiron pipefish)
- Choeroichthys sculptus (Günther, 1870) (Sculptured pipefish)
- Choeroichthys smithi C. E. Dawson, 1976
- Choeroichthys suillus Whitley, 1951 (Pig-snouted pipefish)
