= Iranoaster =

Scientific classification
- Kingdom: Plantae
- Clade: Tracheophytes
- Clade: Angiosperms
- Clade: Eudicots
- Clade: Asterids
- Order: Asterales
- Family: Asteraceae
- Subfamily: Asteroideae
- Tribe: Astereae
- Subtribe: Iranoasterinae
- Genus: Iranoaster; Kaz.Osaloo, Farhani & Mozaff.
- Species: I. bachtiaricus

Binomial name
- Iranoaster bachtiaricus (Mozaff.) Kaz.Osaloo, Farhani & Mozaff.

Synonyms
- Aster bachtiaricus Mozaff. (1996)

Genus of flowering plants

Iranoaster is a genus of flowering plants in the family Asteraceae. It includes a single species, Iranoaster bachtiaricus, which is endemic to Iran.
