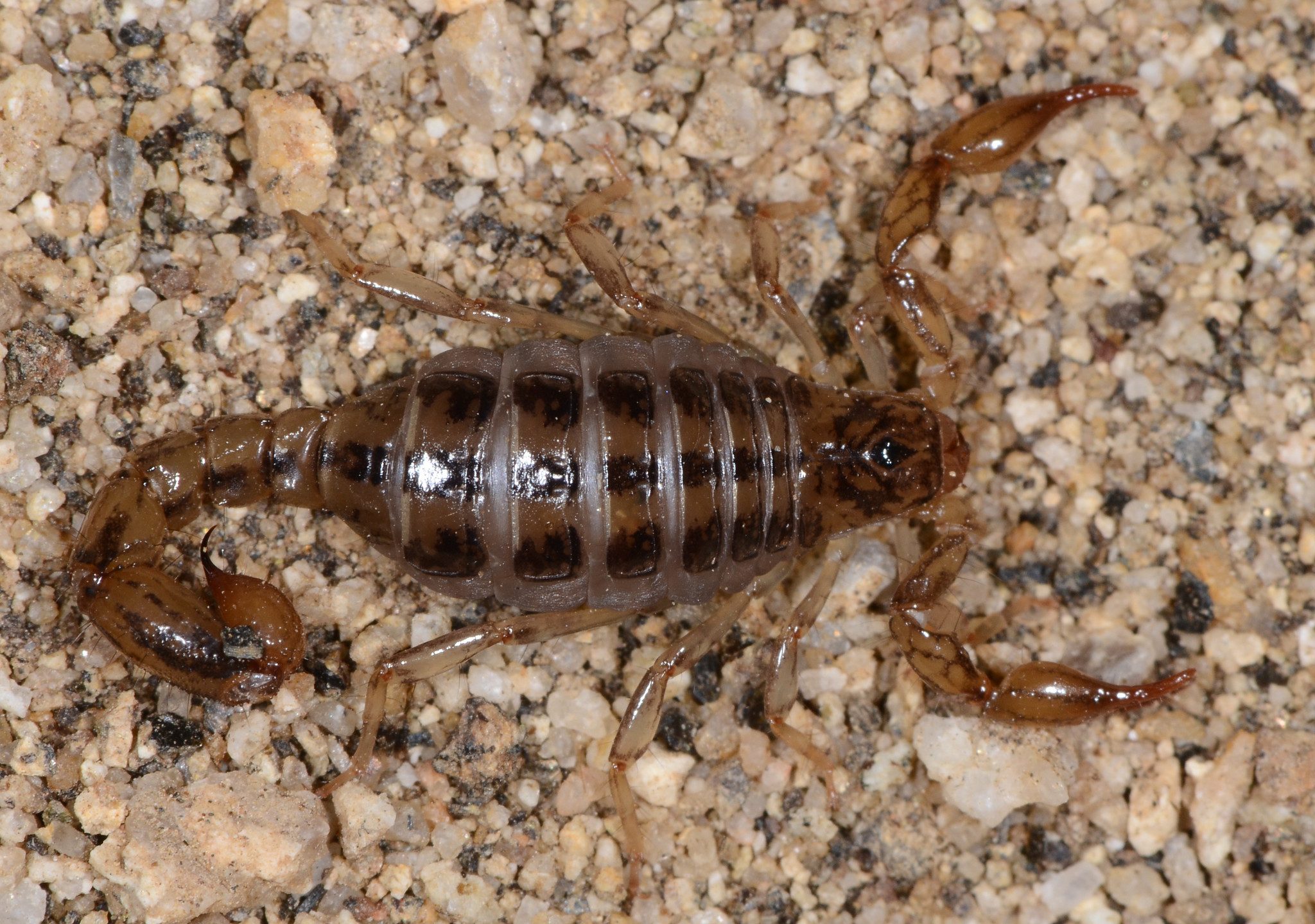
- Superstitionia donensis, Joshua Tree National Park

Scientific classification
- Kingdom: Animalia
- Phylum: Arthropoda
- Subphylum: Chelicerata
- Class: Arachnida
- Order: Scorpiones
- Superfamily: Chactoidea
- Family: Superstitioniidae; Stahnke, 1940
- Genus: Superstitionia; Stahnke, 1940
- Species: S. donensis

Binomial name
- Superstitionia donensis Stahnke, 1940

= Superstitionia =

Genus of scorpions

Superstitionia donensis is a species of scorpion, the only species in the genus Superstitionia and the family Superstitioniidae.

This species was discovered in Arizona in 1940 by H.L Stahnke and predominately is found in western New Mexico, Arizona, extreme southern Nevada, and southern California in the United States. It is also found in Baja California, Baja California Sur, and Sonora in Mexico.

The genus name refers to the Superstition Mountains where the species was first discovered. S. donensis is normally found living in mountain terrain and under rocks or near plants in desert terrain.

== Taxonomy ==
The family Superstitioniidae is monotypic, meaning it contains only one species, S. donensis. This family is sister to Typhlochactidae, the Mexican cave scorpions, within the superfamily Chactoidea.

A study done by Marshall University in Mississippi studied the anatomy of this species by looking at Dr. Victor Fet’s personal scorpion collection at Marshall University, noticed that one specimen had a deformity of the pedipalp finger dentition.

== Venom ==
Studies conducted on the venom of this family presented several transcription profiles on the genetic makeup of the venom which shows how little research has been done on this species as well as venom of scorpions overall. The molecular toxins and mechanisms that makeup the venom in this family is different from the more well known species and probes researchers to delve more in this unexplored species. Overall, though the transcriptional profiles produced in this study were different from the more common scorpions, this species is not more venomous than any other species of scorpions.
