= Microceratops =

Microceratops may refer to:

- Microceratops Seyrig, 1952, an invalid junior synonym of Neopimpla, an ichneumonid wasp genus
- Microceratops Bohlin, 1953, an invalid senior synonym of Microceratus, a ceratopsian genus
