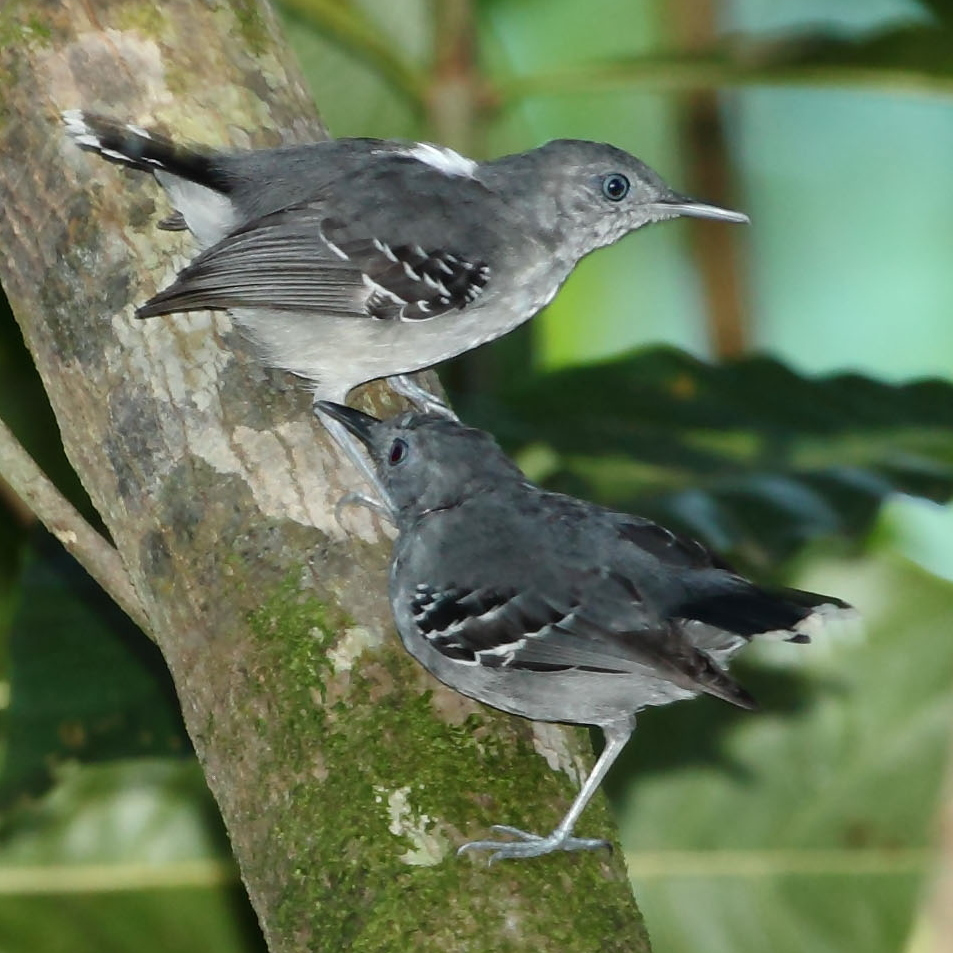
- A pair of band-tailed antbirds (Hypocnemoides maculicauda)

Scientific classification
- Kingdom: Animalia
- Phylum: Chordata
- Class: Aves
- Order: Passeriformes
- Family: Thamnophilidae
- Genus: Hypocnemoides; Bangs & Penard, 1918

Type species
- Hypocnemis melanopogon P.L. Sclater, 1857

Species
- Hypocnemoides maculicauda Hypocnemoides melanopogon

= Hypocnemoides =

Genus of birds

Hypocnemoides is a genus of passerine bird in the antbird family, Thamnophilidae. It contains two species, the black-chinned antbird (H. melanopogon) and the band-tailed antbird (H. maculicauda). They are found in swampy areas of northern South America. There is limited overlap in their distributions with the band-tailed antbird occurring to the south of the Amazon River and the black-chinned antbird mainly found to the north. They are fairly small birds, 11.5–12 cm in length, with a short tail and longish bill. Their plumage is grey with areas of black and white. They forage for food near water in the understorey or on the ground. The name Hypocnemoides is a combination of the genus name Hypocnemis and -oides (Greek for "resembling").

The genus contains two species:

- Black-chinned antbird, Hypocnemoides melanopogon
- Band-tailed antbird, Hypocnemoides maculicauda
