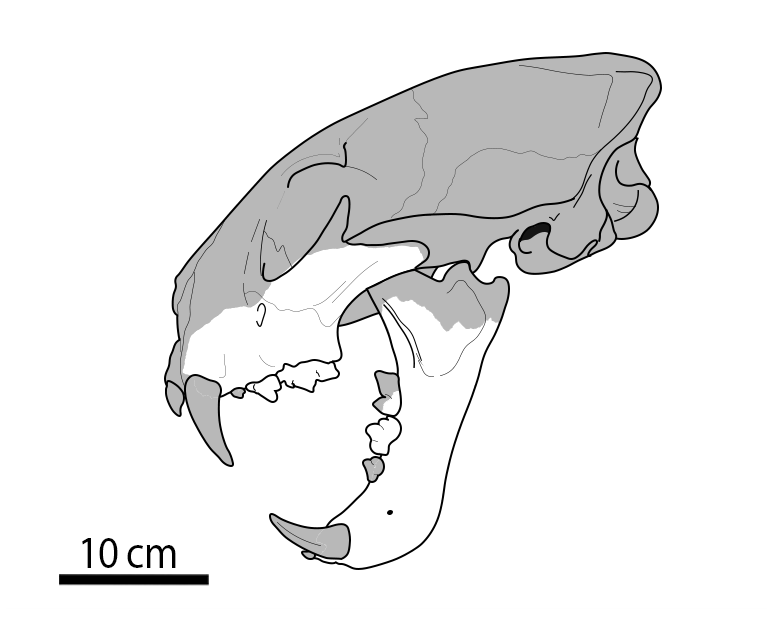
- Skeletal reconstruction of the skull, with known material in white

Scientific classification
- Kingdom: Animalia
- Phylum: Chordata
- Class: Mammalia
- Infraclass: Placentalia
- Order: Carnivora
- Family: Felidae
- Subfamily: Pantherinae
- Genus: †Pachypanthera de Bonis et al., 2023

Type species
- †Pachypanthera piriyai de Bonis et al., 2023
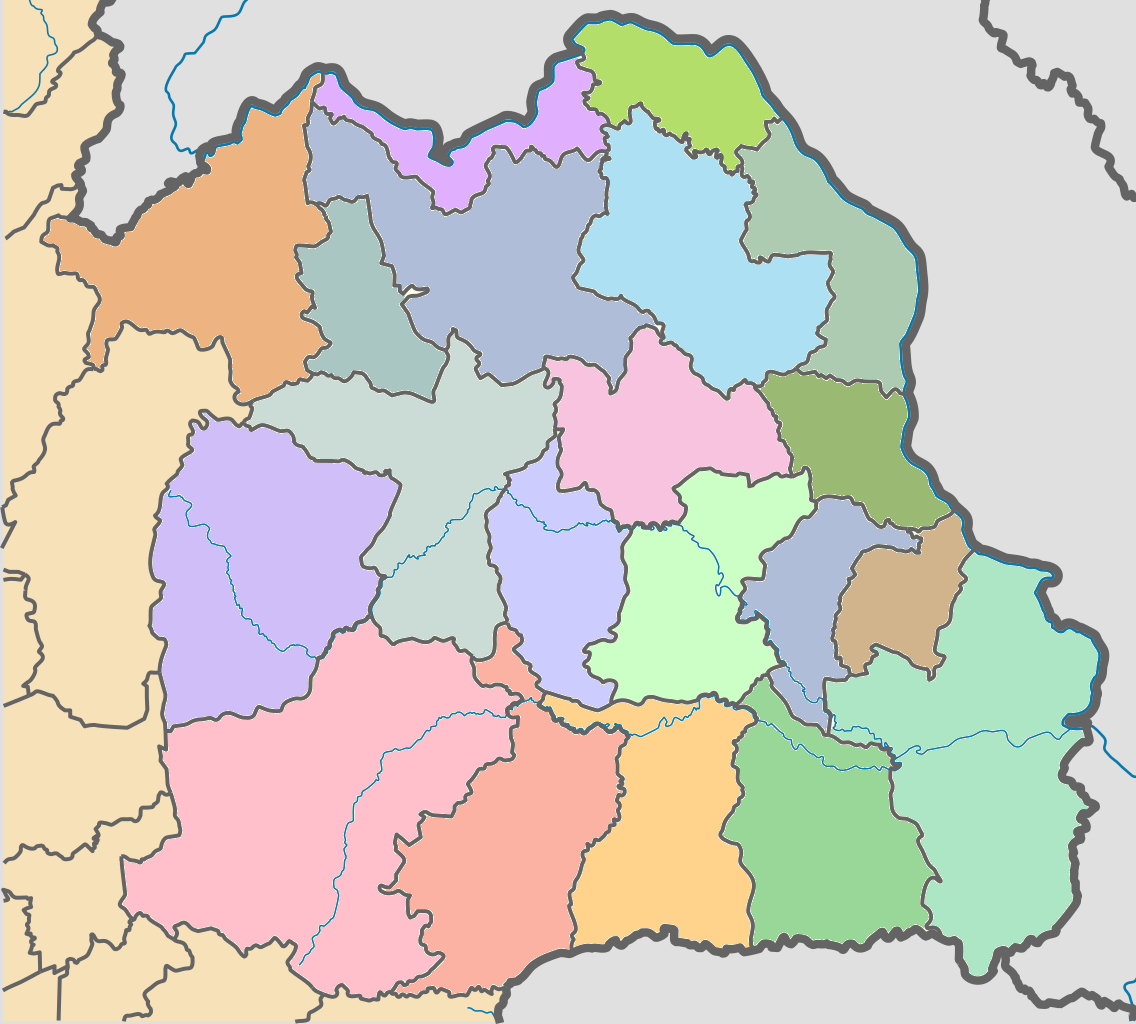
- Location of the Khorat sand pits (Thailand Isan TMD) Location of the Khorat sand pits (Thailand)

= Pachypanthera =

Pachypanthera Temporal range: Late Miocene

Genus of prehistoric mammals

Pachypanthera is an extinct genus of pantherine felid (big cat) that was recovered from the Late Miocene-aged Khorat sand pits in northeastern Thailand. It contains a single species, Pachypanthera piriyai, named and described in 2023.

== Discovery and naming ==
Both the holotype and paratype were discovered in the Khorat sand pits in the Nakhon Ratchasima province of northeastern Thailand. This locality was dated to the Late Miocene, some 9 to 6 million years ago. The fossils were collected by a local amateur, described and named in 2023, and afterwards stored at the geological department of the Chulalongkorn University in Bangkok.

The genus name Pachypanthera is a combination of the Greek παχύς/pachy meaning "thick" and Panthera. The specific name piriyai honors Piriya Vachajitpan, who contributed significantly to fossil collection.

== Description ==
The recovered remains of this genus are unusually robust compared to other felids. The holotype (CUF-KR-1) comprises the left half of the mandible with the incisor and canine alveoli, the third and fourth premolars, and the first molar, missing its crown. The paratype (CUF-KR-2) is a large fragment of the right maxilla with the alveoli of the canine, the third and fourth premolars, and the first molar. The zig-zag structure of the Hunter-Schreger bands in its premolars bear similarities to those of hyenas, suggesting that it was somewhat adapted for durophagy (bone-eating).

== Classification ==
Pachypanthera was a pantherine cat, related to Neofelis, Panthera, and possibly Miopanthera. However, a phylogenetic analysis was not conducted in the description of Pachypanthera, and so its exact evolutionary relationships remain unresolved.

In 2026, paleontologist Helmut Hemmer suggested including P. piriyai in the forgotten genus Feliopsis.

== Paleobiology ==
The robustness of the jaws and the teeth suggests Pachypanthera had a durophagous diet, and so it was likely adapted to process hard animal material, like shells and bones. While there are no post-cranial remains of this big cat, weight estimates extrapolated from the size of the teeth suggest the animal weighed 142 kilograms (313 lb). This would make it one of the largest Miocene representatives of the Pantherinae.

== Paleoenvironment ==
The fauna of the sand pits overlap with fossil mammals found in the lower Dhok Pathan zone in the Siwaliks and are thus considered to be of similar age. The paleoenvironment of the region was dominated by a river system, and was a swampy environment mixed with closed woodlands. Plant pollen studies indicate it was likely a forest-grassland transition area as well as a floodplain.

Other fossil mammals found at that locality include the hominoid Khoratpithecus, four species of rhinocerotids, two species of suids, three species of anthracotheres, a giraffid, four species of bovids, and several species of proboscideans.
