= Acanthogeophilus =

Scientific classification
- Kingdom: Animalia
- Phylum: Arthropoda
- Subphylum: Myriapoda
- Class: Chilopoda
- Order: Geophilomorpha
- Family: Geophilidae
- Genus: Acanthogeophilus; Minelli, 1982

Genus of centipedes

Acanthogeophilus is a genus of soil centipedes in the family Geophilidae, found in the centro-west part of the Mediterranean region. The species in this genus are slender, 2-3 centimeters long, with 67 to 71 pairs of stout legs, peculiar spine-like processes on the ultimate legs, a claw-like pretarsus, complete coxo-pleural sutures, incomplete chitin-lines, absence of a carpophagous pit, possession of only basal denticles, and a transverse band porefield with scattered, anterior pores on the coxopleuron.

The genus contains the following species:

- Acanthogeophilus dentifer Minelli, 1982
- Acanthogeophilus spiniger (Meinert, 1870)

The genus name comes from Ancient Greek ἄκανθα (ákantha), meaning 'spine', 'thorn', γεω- (geo-), meaning 'earth', and φίλος (phílos), meaning 'lover'.
