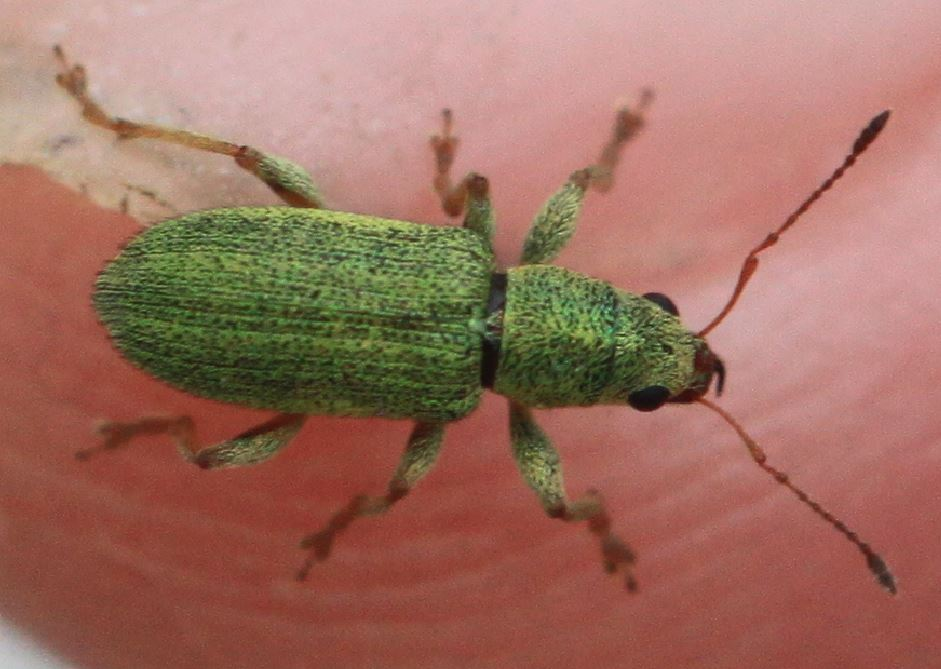
- Pachyrhinus lethierryi

Scientific classification
- Kingdom: Animalia
- Phylum: Arthropoda
- Class: Insecta
- Order: Coleoptera
- Suborder: Polyphaga
- Infraorder: Cucujiformia
- Family: Curculionidae
- Tribe: Polydrusini
- Genus: Pachyrhinus; Schönherr, 1823

= Pachyrhinus =

Genus of beetles

Pachyrhinus is a genus of pine needle weevils in the beetle family Curculionidae. There are more than 30 described species in Pachyrhinus.

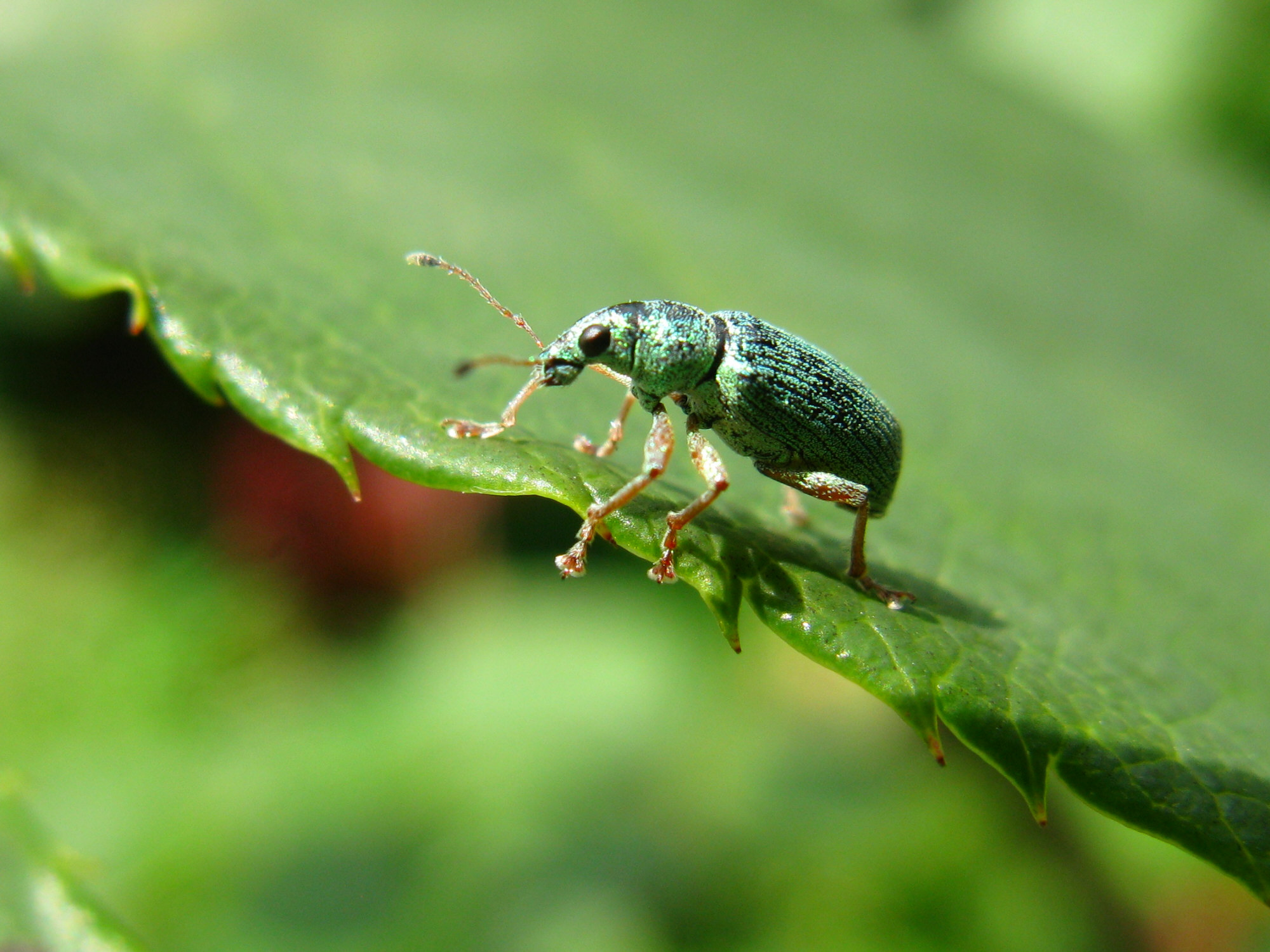
Pachyrhinus lethierryi

== Species ==
- Pachyrhinus auriceps (Desbrochers des Loges, 1903)
- Pachyrhinus breviceps (Peyerimhoff, 1929)
- Pachyrhinus californicus (Horn, 1876) (rusty pineneedle weevil)
- Pachyrhinus cedri (Chevrolat, 1866)
- Pachyrhinus cinereus (Casey, 1888)
- Pachyrhinus dentipes (Seidlitz, 1867)
- Pachyrhinus desbrochersi (Raffray, 1873)
- Pachyrhinus distinctus (Hoffmann, 1942)
- Pachyrhinus elegans (Couper, 1865)
- Pachyrhinus eusomoides (Desbrochers des Loges, 1904)
- Pachyrhinus glabratus (Chevrolat, 1866)
- Pachyrhinus grandiceps (Desbrochers des Loges, 1894)
- Pachyrhinus inermis (Desbrochers des Loges, 1897)
- Pachyrhinus javeti (Desbrochers des Loges, 1872)
- Pachyrhinus kocheri (Hoffmann, 1961)
- Pachyrhinus lethierryi (Desbrochers des Loges, 1875)
- Pachyrhinus lopezi (Hoffmann, 1956)
- Pachyrhinus marginipennis Morimoto, 2015
- Pachyrhinus metallicus (Desbrochers des Loges, 1884)
- Pachyrhinus minutioculatus (Gandhi & Pajni, 1984)
- Pachyrhinus oxycedri (Fairmaire, 1884)
- Pachyrhinus phoeniceus (Fairmaire, 1883)
- Pachyrhinus pineti (Fairmaire, 1884)
- Pachyrhinus raffrayi (Desbrochers des Loges, 1872)
- Pachyrhinus scutellaris (Roelofs, 1873)
- Pachyrhinus squamosus (Kiesenwetter, 1852)
- Pachyrhinus squamulosus (Herbst, 1795)
- Pachyrhinus variabilis (Desbrochers des Loges, 1890)
- Pachyrhinus vidali (Hustache, 1946)
- Pachyrhinus warioni (Marseul, 1876)
- Pachyrhinus yasumatsui (Kono & Morimoto, 1960)
