= Eurasian cave lion =

Eurasian cave lion may refer to:

- Panthera fossilis, the Middle Pleistocene Eurasian cave lion
- Panthera spelaea, the Late Pleistocene Eurasian cave lion
