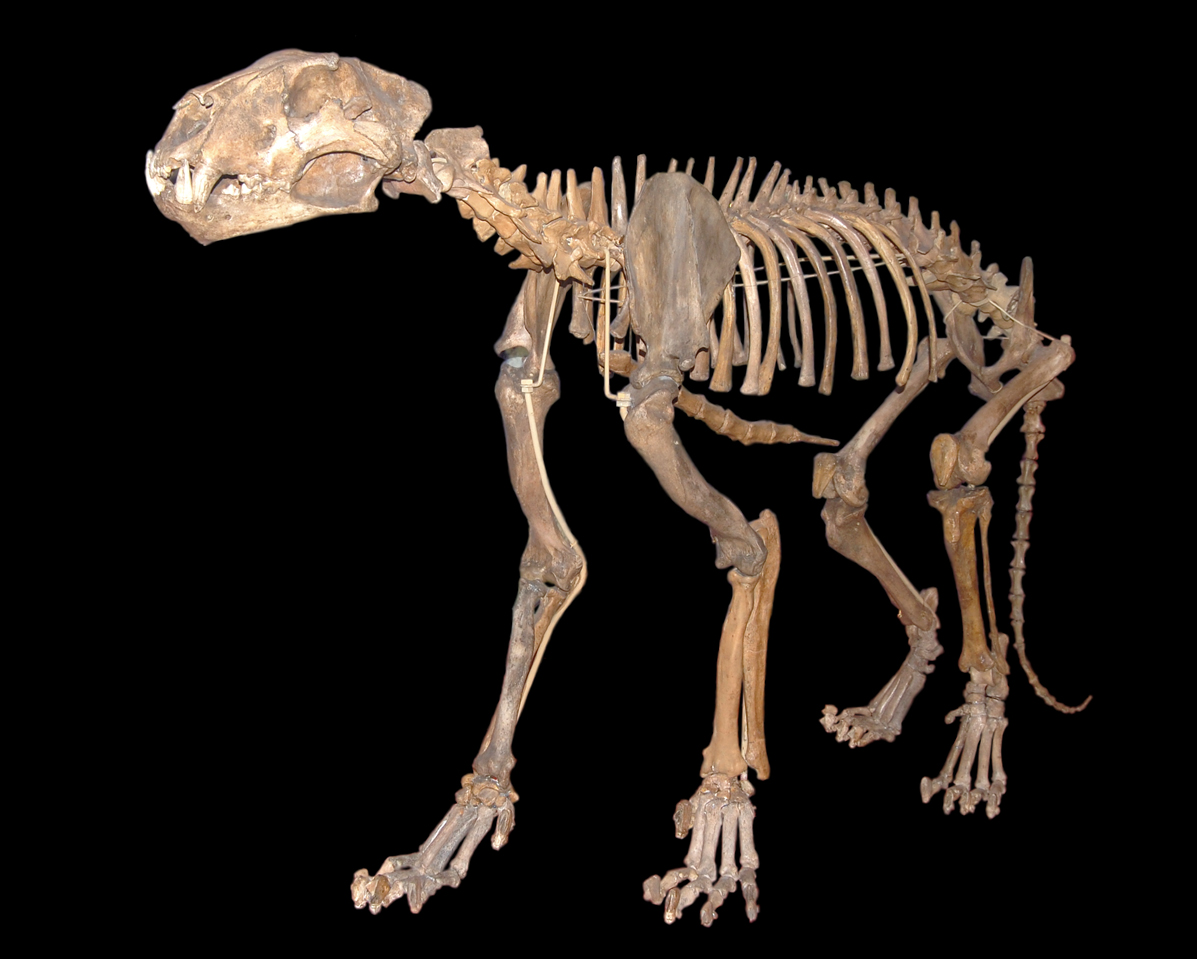
- Skeleton in Natural History Museum, Vienna

Scientific classification
- Kingdom: Animalia
- Phylum: Chordata
- Class: Mammalia
- Order: Carnivora
- Family: Felidae
- Genus: Panthera
- Species: †P. spelaea

Binomial name
- †Panthera spelaea Goldfuss, 1810

Subspecies
- Panthera spelaea fossilis? (Reichenau, 1906); Panthera spelaea intermedia (Argant & Brugal, 2017 ); Panthera spelaea spelaea (Goldfuss, 1810); Panthera spelaea vereshchagini (Baryshnikov & Boeskorov, 2001)
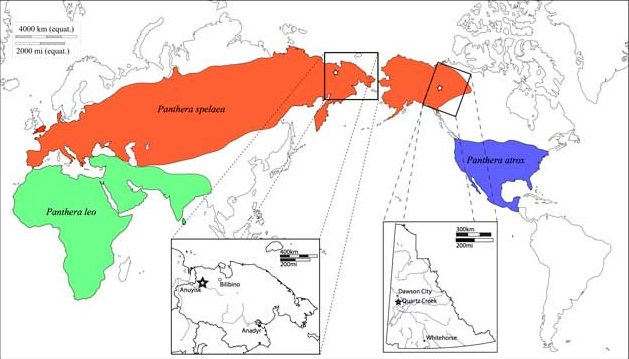
- Red indicates the general of Panthera spelaea, blue Panthera atrox, and green Panthera leo. Range is outdated as it does not include some areas now known to be inhabited by P. spelaea such as Japan.

Synonyms
- Panthera leo spelaea M. Boule & L. De Villeneuve, 1927

= Panthera spelaea =

Panthera spelaea Temporal range: Middle-Late Pleistocene, 0.3–0.013 Ma (Possible Early Pleistocene records if P. fossilis is considered a subspecies)

Extinct species of lion

Panthera spelaea, commonly known as the cave lion or in some scientific literature, the steppe lion, is an extinct species of Panthera that inhabited Eurasia and northwestern North America during the Pleistocene. Ancient DNA analyses indicate that, although closely related to the modern lion (Panthera leo), it was a genetically distinct species. Estimates place the divergence between the two lineages at approximately 500,000 to 1 million years ago.

The earliest fossils of the P. spelaea lineage (either regarded as the separate species Panthera fossilis or the subspecies P. spelaea fossilis) in Eurasia date to around 700,000 years ago (with possible late Early Pleistocene records). It is closely related and probably ancestral to the American lion (Panthera atrox). The species ranged from Western Europe to eastern Beringia in North America, and was a prominent member of the mammoth steppe fauna, and an important apex predator across its range along with other large carnivores like cave hyenas, which cave lions came into conflict with.

It closely resembled living lions with a coat of yellowish-grey fur, though depictions in cave art have led to suggestions that males lacked substantial manes unlike those present in living male lions. Whether or not cave lions lived in social groups like living lions is uncertain, but they are often suggested to have been largely solitary, similar to living tigers.

Panthera spelaea interacted with both Neanderthals and modern humans, who used their pelts and, in the case of the latter, depicted them in artistic works.

Cave lions became extinct about 13,000 years ago as part of the end-Pleistocene extinction event, the precise cause of which is unknown, though climatic change, changes in prey abundance, and competition with other carnivores and humans have been suggested as possible causal factors.

== Research history and taxonomy ==
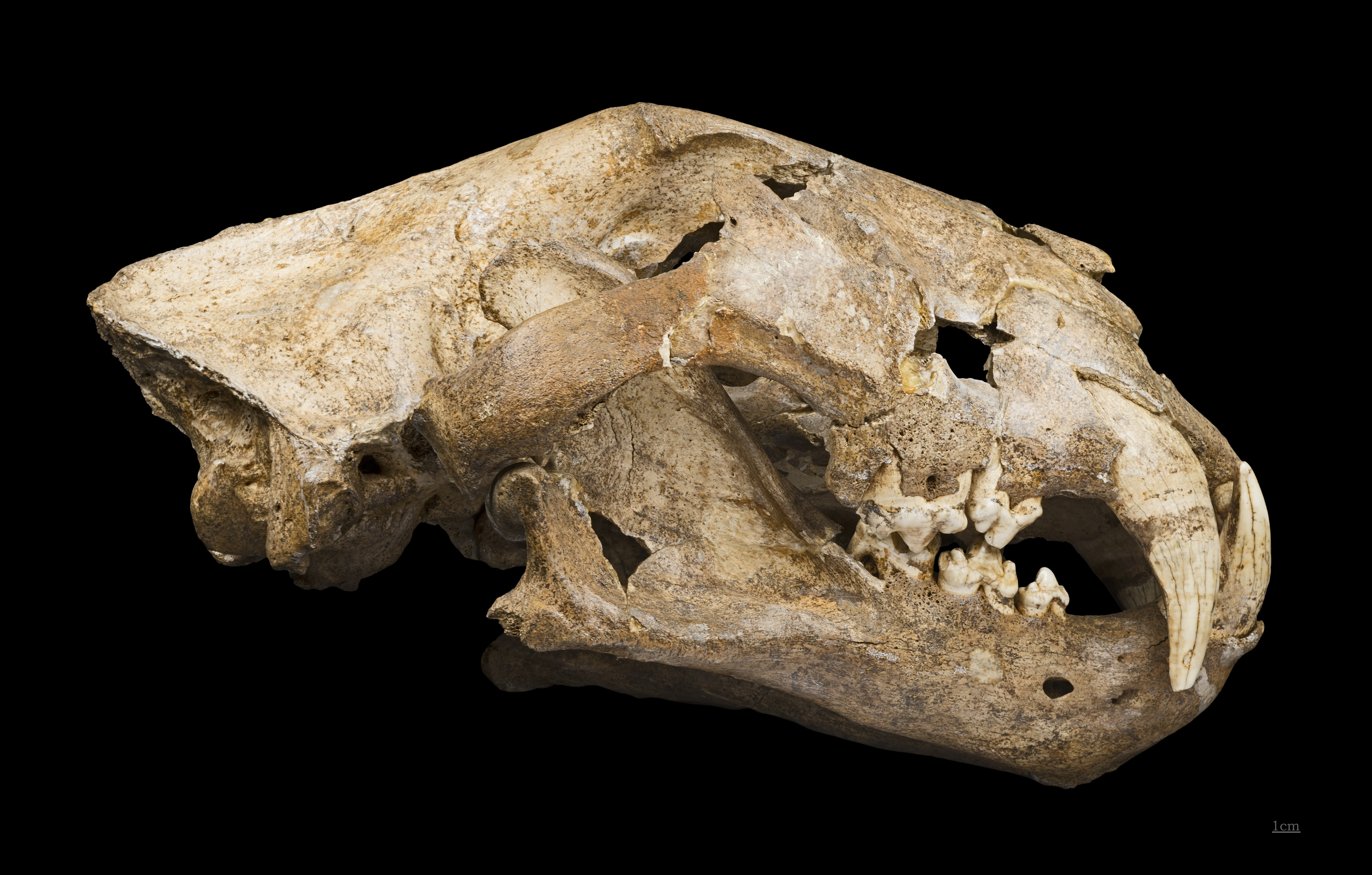
Cave lion skull exhibited in the Muséum de Toulouse, France

In 1774, the Zoolithenhöhle cave near the village of Burggaillenreuth in Bavaria, was brought to scientific attention by Johan Friedrich Esper, who realised that the bones of extinct animals were present in the cave. In 1810, a fossil skull from the cave was given the scientific name Felis spelaea by Georg August Goldfuss. It possibly dates to the Last Glacial Period.

Several anatomical studies of P. spelaea remains conducted during the early-mid 19th century revealed a similar morphology as the tiger, jaguar and a close affinity to the modern lion. At the end of the 19th century, the earliest remains of P. spelaea from Siberia were mistaken for those of a tiger. During the 20th century and the first decade of the 21st century, P. spelaea was often regarded as a subspecies of the modern lion under the name Panthera leo spelaea. However, other authors considered the cave lion to be more closely related to the tiger, based in part on a comparison of skull shapes, with some proposing that it should be considered a subspecies of the tiger as Panthera tigris spelaea. Analysis of cave lion mitochondrial genomes published in 2004 supported the modern lion as the closest relative of P. spelaea, with this result being later confirmed by analysis of the nuclear genome. Results from morphological studies showed that it is distinct in cranial and dental anatomy to justify the specific status of P. spelaea. Results of genetic studies also support this assessment.

In 2001, the subspecies Panthera spelaea vereshchagini was proposed for seven specimens found in Siberia and Yukon, which have smaller skulls and teeth than the average P. spelaea. Before 2020, genetic analysis using ancient DNA provided no evidence for their distinct subspecific status; DNA signatures from P. spelaea from Europe and Alaska were indistinguishable, suggesting one large panmictic population. However, analysis of mitochondrial genome sequences from 31 cave lions showed that they fall into two monophyletic clades. One lived across western Europe and the other was restricted to Beringia during the Pleistocene. For this reason, the Beringian population was proposed to represent a distinct subspecies, P. s. vereshchagini. Contrarily to the mitochondrial genome studies, a 2026 study based on the nuclear genome suggested that cave lions had extensive gene flow across their range, showing high genetic similarity between individuals in eastern and western Eurasia, with a lesser amount of deep local ancestry in some regions, though the Beringia population appears to have been more isolated.

=== Evolution ===
Lion-like pantherine felids first appeared in the Tanzanian Olduvai Gorge about 1.7 to 1.2 million years ago. These cats dispersed into Eurasia from East Africa around the end of the Early Pleistocene and the beginning of the Middle Pleistocene, giving rise to Panthera fossilis. The oldest widely accepted fossils of P. fossilis in Europe date to around 700,000-600,000 years ago, such as that from Pakefield in England, with possible older fossils from Western Siberia dating to the late Early Pleistocene, with a 2024 study suggesting a presence in Spain by 1 million years ago during the latest Early Pleistocene around the same age as the Siberian specimen. Different authors considered Panthera fossils as either a distinct species ancestral to P. spelaea, or as a subspecies of P. spelaea. Mitochondrial divergence estimates have been used to propose P. spelaea and modern lions split from each other around 1.85 Ma. A 2020 study based on the nuclear genome suggested that modern and cave lions had been separate since 500,000 years ago, while a 2026 study suggested that the divergence was earlier, around 1 million years ago based on the estimated time when their effective population sizes estimated from the genome are suggested to have diverged. While the 2020 study (which only sampled Siberian cave lions) suggested that cave lions had not interbred with modern lions since their divergence, the 2026 study (which sampled cave lions across their range) results indicated that there had been some small amounts of gene flow (less than 5% of the genome) since their divergence, with some Late Pleistocene cave lions having up to 3.2%–4.4% ancestry from modern lions. This modern lion ancestry has closest affinities to recently extinct populations of the Asiatic lion from West Asia than to other modern lion populations, suggesting that this is likely the region in which the two species contacted, likely as a result of the distribution of cave lions being pushed southwards during glacial periods.

Cladogram after Tseng et al. (2014):

- Felidae
  - Felinae
  - Pantherinae
    - Neofelis (clouded leopards)
    - Panthera
      - † Panthera palaeosinensis
      - - Panthera tigris (tiger)
        - Panthera uncia (snow leopard)
      - - Panthera onca (jaguar)
        - - Panthera pardus (leopard)
          - - Panthera leo (lion)
            - - †Panthera spelaea (cave lion)
              - †Panthera atrox (American lion)

The arrival of Panthera (spelaea) fossilis in Europe was part of a faunal turnover event around the Early-Middle Pleistocene transition in which many of the species that characterised the preceding late Villafranchian became extinct. In the carnivore guild, this notably included the giant hyena Pachycrocuta and the sabertooth cat Megantereon. Following the arrival of Panthera (spelaea) fossilis the lion-sized sabertooth cat Homotherium and the "European jaguar" Panthera gombaszoegensis became much rarer, and in the case of Homotherium, also less massive. Both became extinct in Europe during the late Middle Pleistocene, with competition with lions suggested to be a likely important factor. (Note: A single controversial finding of a Late Pleistocene Homotherium fossil from the North Sea could indicate the survival of Homotherium in more northern and eastern areas, or a brief re-colonization from northern Asia or even North America.)

Specimens intermediate between P. fossilis and Late Pleistocene P. spelaea are referred to as the subspecies P. s. intermedia. The transition from P. fossilis to Late Pleistocene P. spelaea shows significant reduction in body size, as well as changes in skull and tooth morphology. Mitochondrial DNA sequence data from fossil lion remains show that the American lion represents a sister group of Late Pleistocene P. spelaea, and likely arose when an early P. spelaea population became isolated south of the Cordilleran Ice Sheet. Initially this was suggested to be around 340,000 years ago, but later studies suggested that the split between the two species was probably younger, around 165,000 years ago, consistent with the late first appearance of P. spelaea in Eastern Beringia (now Alaska and adjacent regions) during the Illinoian (around 190–130,000 years ago).

== Description ==
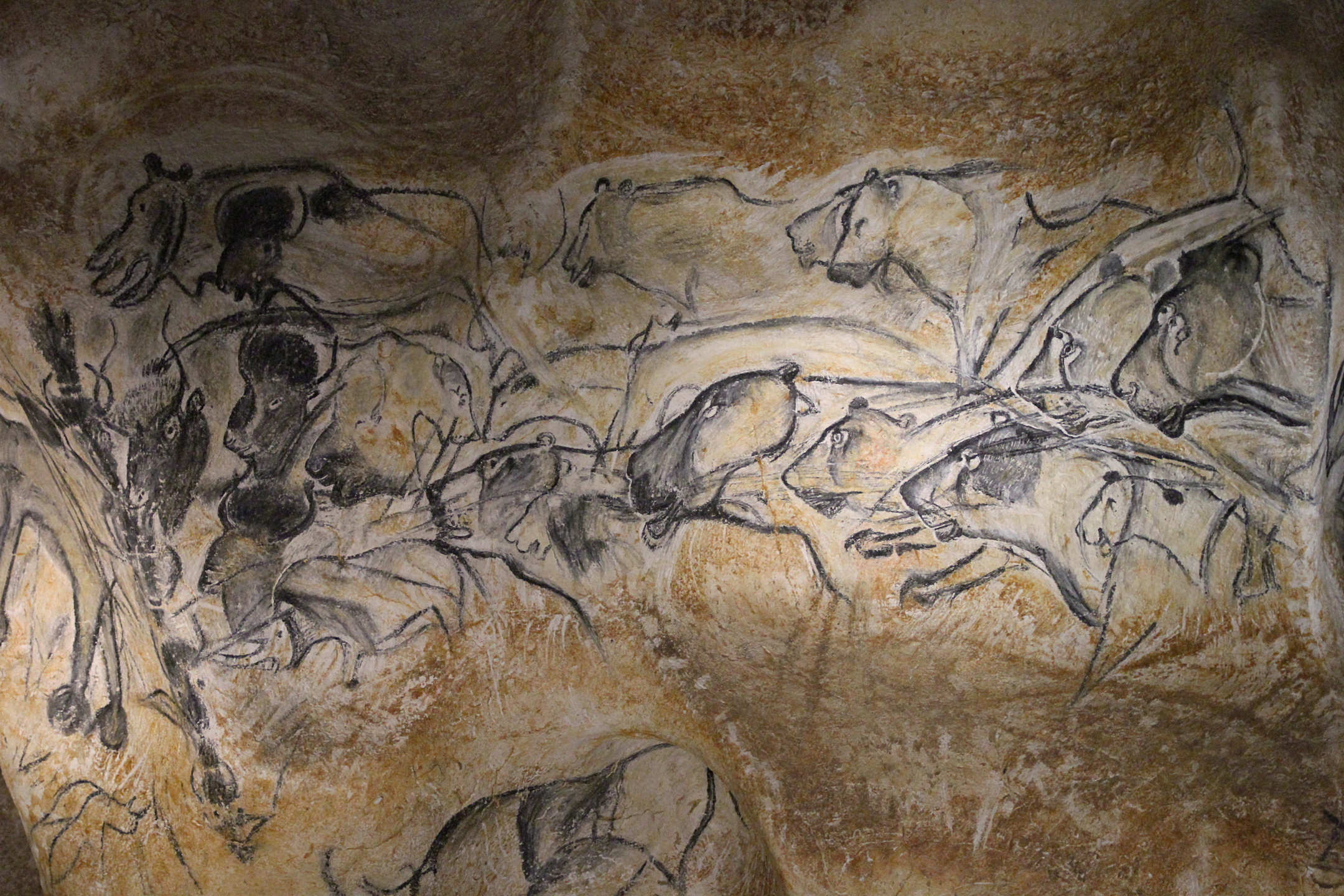
Cave lions and bison depicted in the Chauvet Cave, France

Carvings and cave paintings of cave lions were discovered in the Lascaux and Chauvet Caves in France, dating to the Upper Paleolithic. A drawing in the Chauvet cave depicts two cave lions walking together. The one in the foreground is slightly smaller than the one in the background, which has been drawn with a scrotum and without a mane. Such cave paintings suggest that male cave lions completely lacked manes, or at most had very small manes.

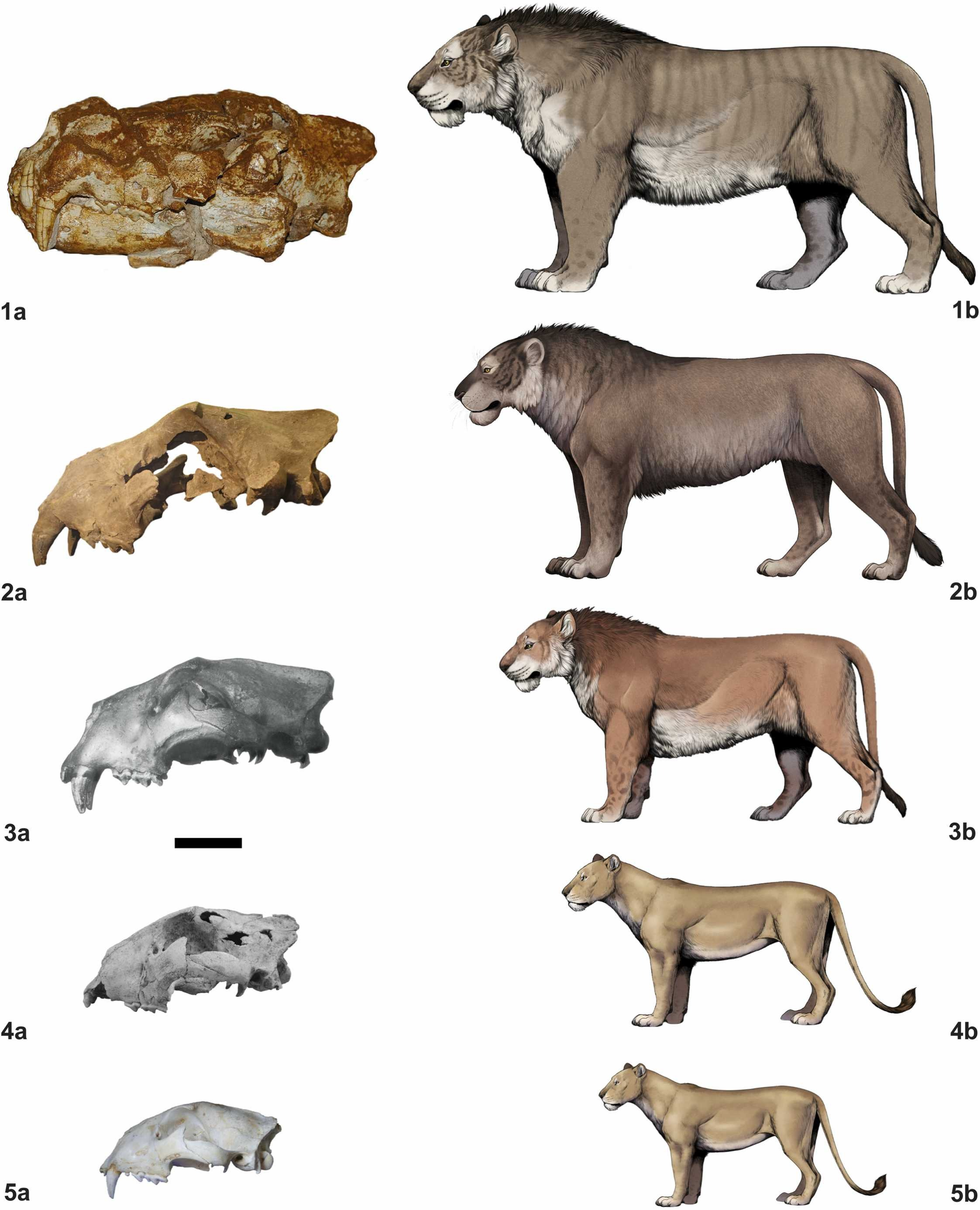
Size comparison of various specimens attributed to the P. spelaea/fossilis lineage spanning from the early Middle Pleistocene (1) to the end of the Late Pleistocene (5) (Note: 1 =P. (spelaea) fossilis male (M) from Château, France MIS (Marine Isotope Stage) 15 ~ 600,000 years ago 2= P. spelaea from Niedźwiedzia Cave, Poland, MIS 5 (130-80,000 years ago). 3 = M from Siegsdorf, Germany MIS 3 (57-29,000 years ago) 4= female (F) from Zandobbio, Italy, Last Interglacial (130-115,000 years ago) 5= F from Kryshtaleva Cave, Ukraine (21-22,000 years ago).) showing great level of size variation and decline in overall body size through time. Scale bar for skulls = 10 cm (3.9 in)

Size comparison of large individuals of Middle Pleistocene Panthera (spelaea) fossilis and Late Pleistocene Panthera spelaea compared to a human

Early members of the cave lion lineage assigned to Panthera (spelaea) fossilis during the Middle Pleistocene were considerably larger than individuals of P. spelaea from the Last Glacial Period and modern lions, with some of these individuals having an estimated length of 2.5–2.9 m (8.2–9.5 ft), shoulder height of 1.4–1.5 m (4.6–4.9 ft) and body mass of 400–500 kg (880–1,100 lb), respectively, making them among the largest cats to have ever lived. The Late Pleistocene Panthera spelaea spelaea was noticeably smaller though still large relative to living cats, with an estimated length of 2–2.1 m (6.6–6.9 ft) and shoulder height of 1.1–1.2 m (3.6–3.9 ft), respectively, The species showed a progressive size reduction over the course of the Last Glacial Period up until its extinction, with the last P. spelaea populations comparable in size to small-sized modern lions, with a body mass of only 70–90 kg (150–200 lb), a body length of 1.2–1.3 m (3.9–4.3 ft) and shoulder height of 70–75 cm (2.30–2.46 ft) respectively.

P. spelaea had a relatively longer and narrower muzzle compared to that of the extant lion, with the zygomatic region being strongly arched, with the carnassial teeth having differences in cusp morphology (displaying preparastyles). Like modern lions, females were smaller than males. Compared to the earlier P. (spelaea) fossilis, Late Pleistocene P. spelaea spelaea differs (in addition to previously mentioned size differences) in having larger incisor teeth, more narrow and flattened canines, as well narrower upper and lower third and fourth premolars, which display some differences in cusp morphology, with the lower first molar being narrower and more elongate. The orbits (eye sockets) of P. spelaea spelaea are also relatively larger and muzzle marginally narrower compared to P. (spelaea) fossilis, with the nasal region also being proportionally narrower, while the postorbital and mastoid regions of the skull are wider, with the tympanic bullae being more inflated.

In 2016, hair found near the Maly Anyuy River was identified as cave lion hair through DNA analysis. Comparison with hair of a modern lion revealed that cave lion hair was probably similar in colour as that of the modern lion, though slightly lighter. In addition, the cave lion is thought to have had a very thick and dense undercoat comprising closed and compressed yellowish-to-white wavy downy hair with a smaller mass of darker-coloured guard hairs, possibly an adaptation to the Ice Age climate. While juveniles fur coat colour was yellowish, adult cave lions are suggested to have had grey fur.

DNA analysis suggest that cave lions had a number of genetic changes not found in modern lions, in various genes relating to the "brain, central nervous system, vision, circulatory system development, and growth".

== Distribution and habitat ==
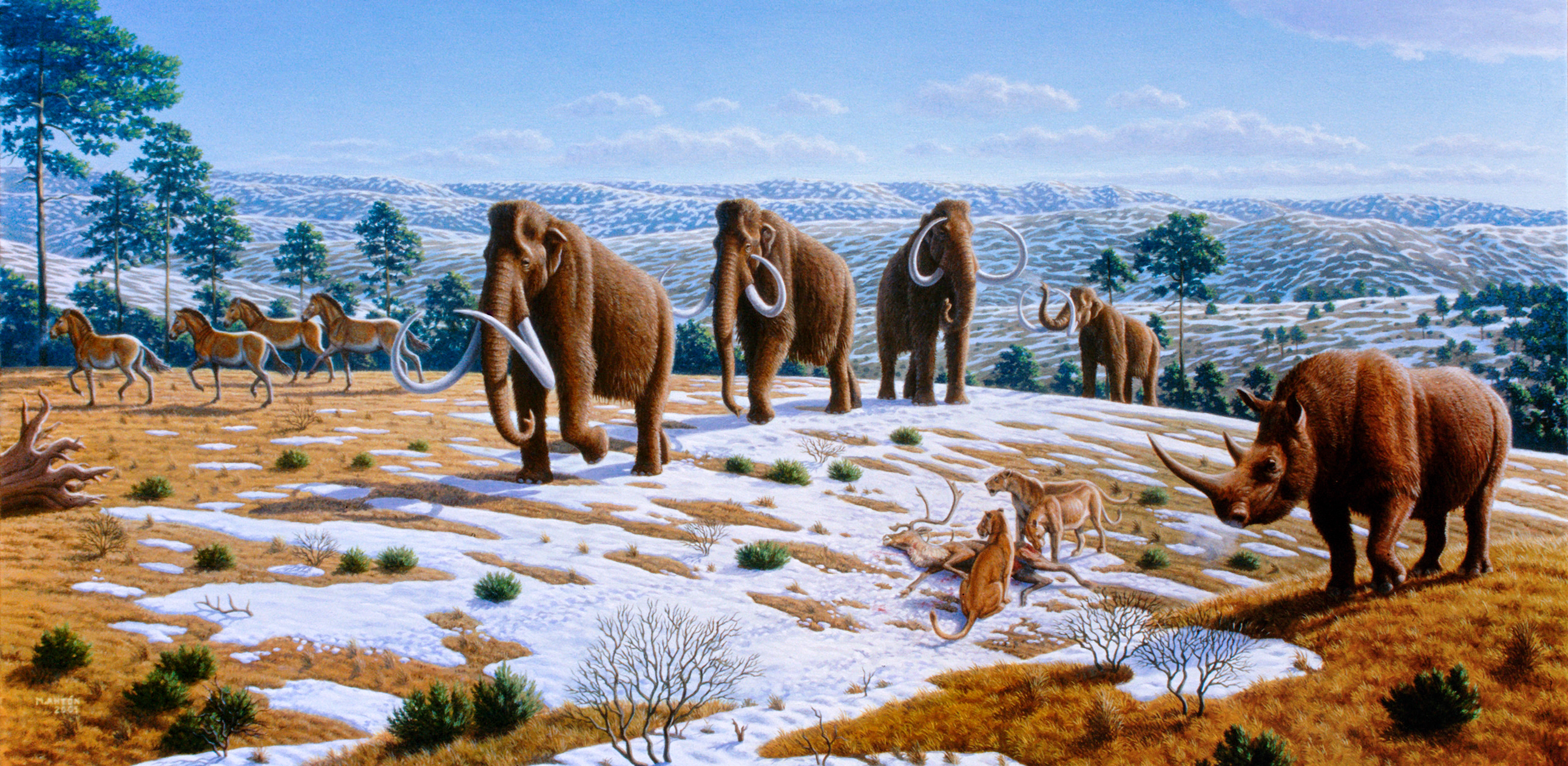
Cave lions feeding on reindeer in a mammoth steppe landscape in northern Spain also including woolly rhinoceros, woolly mammoth and wild horse. Art by Mauricio Antón

During the Last Glacial Period, P. spelaea formed a contiguous population across the mammoth steppe, from Western Europe to northwest North America. It was widely distributed in the Iberian Peninsula, Italian Peninsula, Southeast Europe, Great Britain, Central Europe, the East European Plain, the Ural Mountains, most of Northeast Asia (ranging as far south as Northeast China, Japan, and possibly the Korean Peninsula), and across the Bering land bridge into Alaska, Yukon, and possibly Alberta. While the cave lion was thought to be regionally extinct in Beringia between 33kya and 22kya due to a lack of fossils, eDNA suggests that cave lions may have been present in the Yukon ca. 29,477kya.

The cave lion had a wide elevation range, with finds extending up over 2,000 metres (6,600 ft) above sea level in the European Alps and in Buryatia in Northern Asia, though they probably did not occupy mountainous habitats all-year round. The cave lion probably inhabited predominantly open habitats such as steppe and grasslands although it would have also occurred in open woodlands as well. While during the Last Glacial Period it was often associated with cold environments, the species also inhabited temperate environments, such as in Europe during the Last Interglacial/Eemian.

== Paleobiology ==
=== Ecology ===
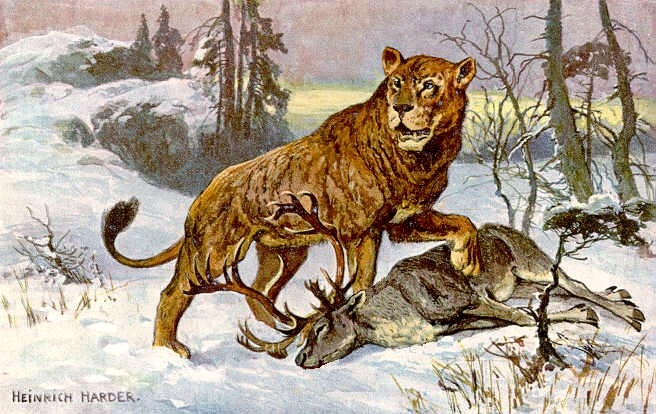
A cave lion with a reindeer, painting by Heinrich Harder

P. spelaea was one of the keystone species of the mammoth steppe, being one of the main apex predators alongside the gray wolf, cave hyena and brown bear. Large amounts of bones belonging to P. spelaea were excavated in caves, where bones of cave hyena, cave bear and Paleolithic artefacts were also found. Despite their common name, "cave lions" probably only infrequently if ever used caves, and were present in regions where caves were absent. Analysis on the ecology of cave lions found that they may have been diurnal predators.

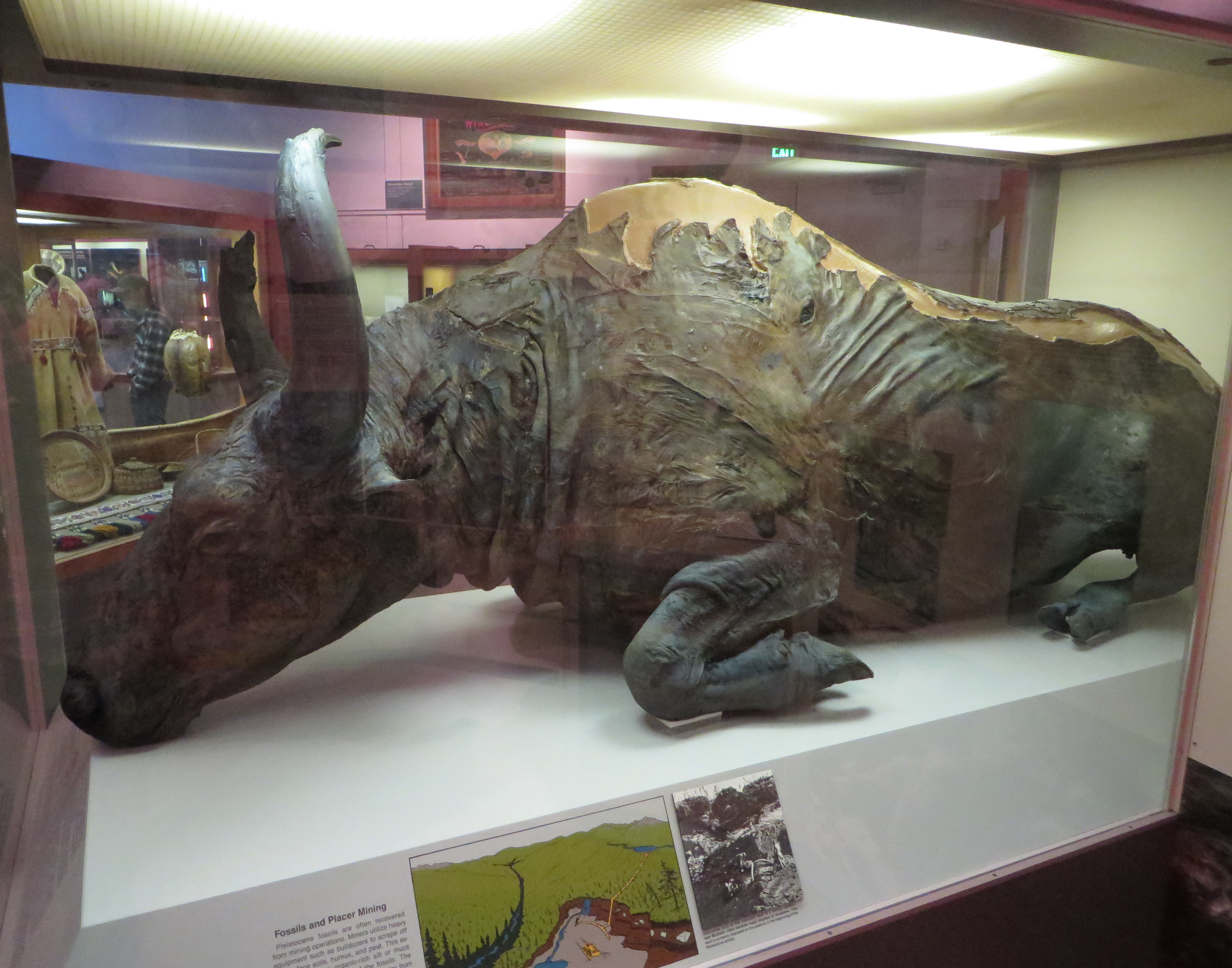
The mummy of Blue Babe, a 36,000-year-old male Steppe Bison found in Alaska with claw marks on its rear and tooth punctures in its skin, which indicate that the bison was killed by a cave lion.

Isotopic analyses of bone collagen samples extracted from remains in Europe and East Beringia indicate that reindeer were particularly prominent in the diet of cave lions in these regions during the Last Glacial Period. Cave lions also seem to have opportunistically preyed on the cubs of cave bears, with adult cave bears also likely being targeted at least on occasion. A young woolly rhinoceros skull found near Kazan in Western Russia appears to display bite marks that may have been the result of a cave lion attack. The "Blue Babe" frozen steppe bison specimen from Alaska displays bite marks that match the dimensions of cave lions, with a lion tooth fragment having been found embedded in the hide. Based on the ratio of males to females, suggests among healthy specimens, male cave lions were expected to have hunted cave bears. Isotopic analysis of other European specimens suggests a diet including wild horse, woolly mammoth and cave bears for these individuals. It may have sought out hibernating bears in montane caves as a food source during the winter. Bite marks found on the bones of straight-tusked elephants in Neumark Nord, Germany, dating to the Last Interglacial, have been suggested to be the result of scavenging by cave lions.

=== Competitors ===
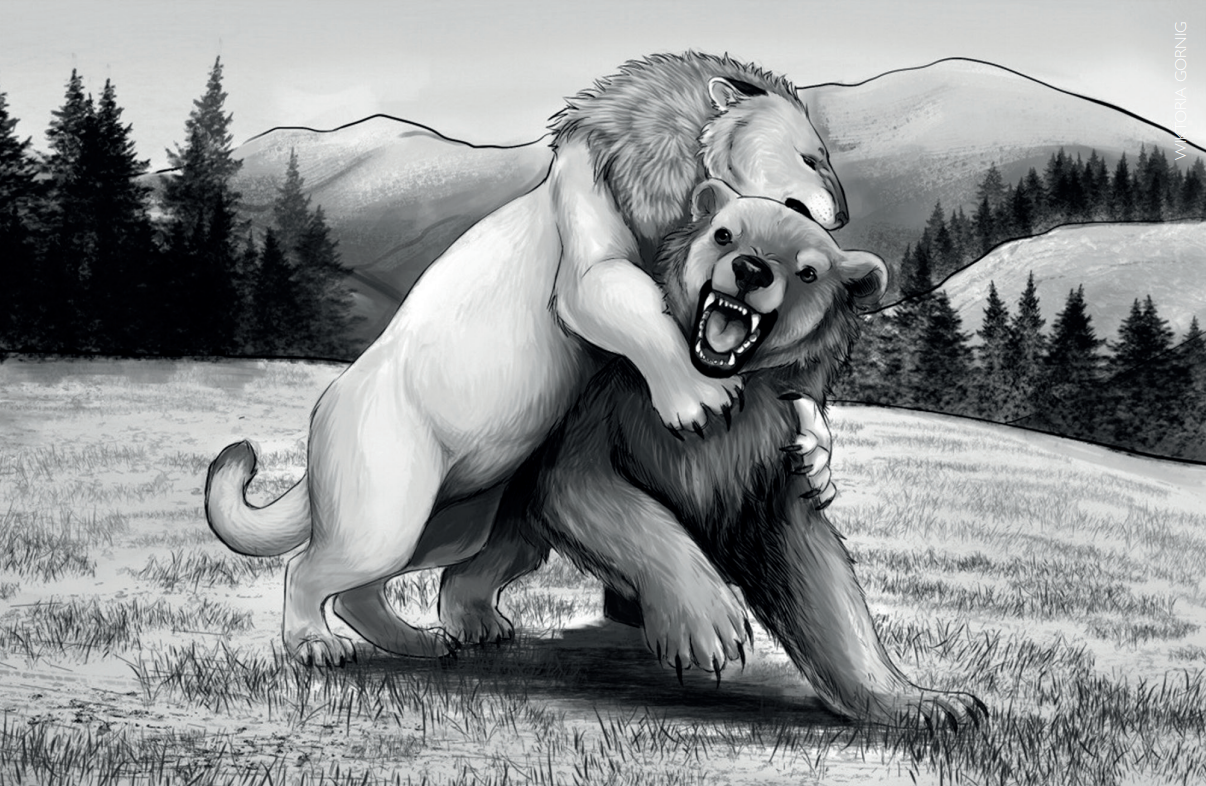
Illustration of a cave lion attacking a steppe brown bear

It likely competed for prey with the European leopards, cave hyenas, brown bears and grey wolves in Eurasia, along with short-faced bears, the sabertooth cat Homotherium, and Beringian wolves in Beringia. Some of these accumulations of cave lion bones in cave hyena dens have been attributed to confrontations between cave hyenas and cave lions over carcasses, with the remains of cave lions killed in these confrontations subsequently transported to the dens. A significant number of these cave lion remains do not bear any evidence of consumption, which may suggest that cave hyena refrained from eating killed cave lions, as is observed in conflicts between living spotted hyenas and African lions. Cave lion cubs and juveniles have also been recovered in cave hyena dens, along with weakened or ill adults. The presence of weakened or ill adults was likely the result of cave lions entering caves to hunt cave bears or to steal prey from cave hyenas which resulted in their deaths. Some caves, such as Zoolithen cave, had a high concentration of males cave lions. This suggests much like modern male lions, male cave lions may have ventured into caves and actively killed cave hyenas. Additionally, cave hyena skulls have been found with bite marks that may have been the result of cave lions attacking cave hyenas. Isotopic analysis suggests cave hyenas and cave lions may have hunted different prey species due to competitive exclusion.

Cave lions may have predated upon smaller brown bears, although they likely lost their kills to larger brown bears. In contrast to tigers, cave lions coexisted with large, robust wolves, which would have been serious competitors, in great numbers, were capable of killing solitary cave lions. After MIS 3, with the appearance of smaller and even dwarf individuals made cave lions increasingly vulnerable to attacks from wolves, which became most notable during MIS 2. Much like cave hyenas, wolves likely competitively excluded cave lions from hunting large prey and probably outcompeted cave lions in accessing prey post-LGM period. In areas where the lion and the cave wolf overlapped, the lion tended to rely on animals not commonly hunted by wolves, like reindeer and bears.

=== Social behavior ===
Cave lion cubs appear to have lived in dens during their earliest stages of life, like modern lion cubs and were likely solely raised by females, like living Panthera species. Whether or not cave lions were gregarious like modern lions is unclear. Sabol and Puzachenko in their 2024 paper stated that the cave lions are "generally thought" to have been solitary, but that "opinions on this vary" and that the question remained open. Some experts, such as Guthrie argue that the cave lion lived solitarily or only in small family groups, based primarily on the lack of manes (which are highly important to the social hierarchy of modern lions) depicted on Paleolithic cave art. This argument was criticized by Yamaguichi and colleagues, they argued that the emergence of group living in lions probably predates the split between cave lions and modern lions and the evolution of manes in modern lions. On the other hand, authors argued gregariousness via sexual dimorphism. Sexual dimorphism within canine dimensions suggests cave lions had similar sexual dimorphism to lions, and in evolutionary context may suggests they lived in groups according to Yamaguichi and colleagues. Boeskorov and their colleagues suggested that the more extreme sexual dimorphism seen in cave lions could suggest that they lived in larger prides. However they admitted that there isn't enough evidence to conclude on their social structure. On the contrary, Valkenburgh and Sacco warned that sexual dimorphism isn't a reliable way to determine group behavior, as leopards are also very sexually dimorphic in canine dimensions but live a solitary lifestyle.

Isotopic analysis on cave lions by Hervé Bocherens and colleagues lead them to suggest that cave lions may have been solitary, due to cave lions shifting their diets after the disappearance of cave hyenas, carcasses being consumed the cave hyenas as well, suggests they were at a competitive disadvantage, and the scattering of isotopic data between individuals. Within mountain ranges and higher altitude environments, cave lions may have also been solitary or hunt in mating pairs, much like today's lions. Lions tend to hunt in prides only in altitudes below 1,500 meters. This proposed behavior for cave lions is supported by the ratios of males and females from Moravian Karst being 1:1.

== Relationship with humans ==
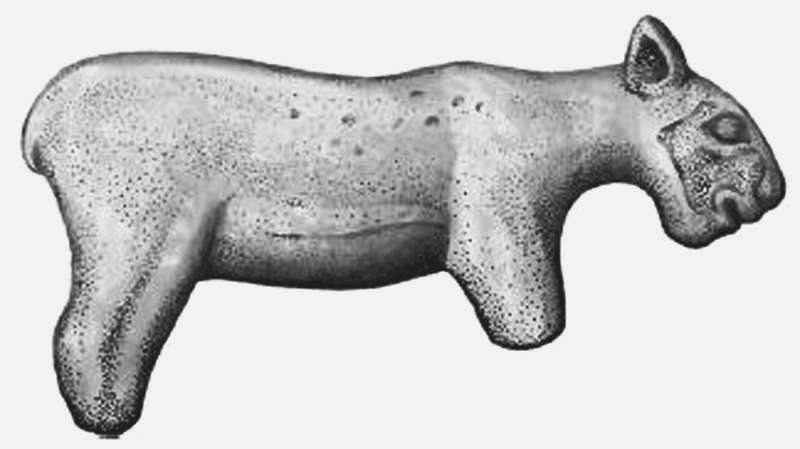
Drawing of a now-lost Palaeolithic sculpture of a cave lion from Isturitz, France

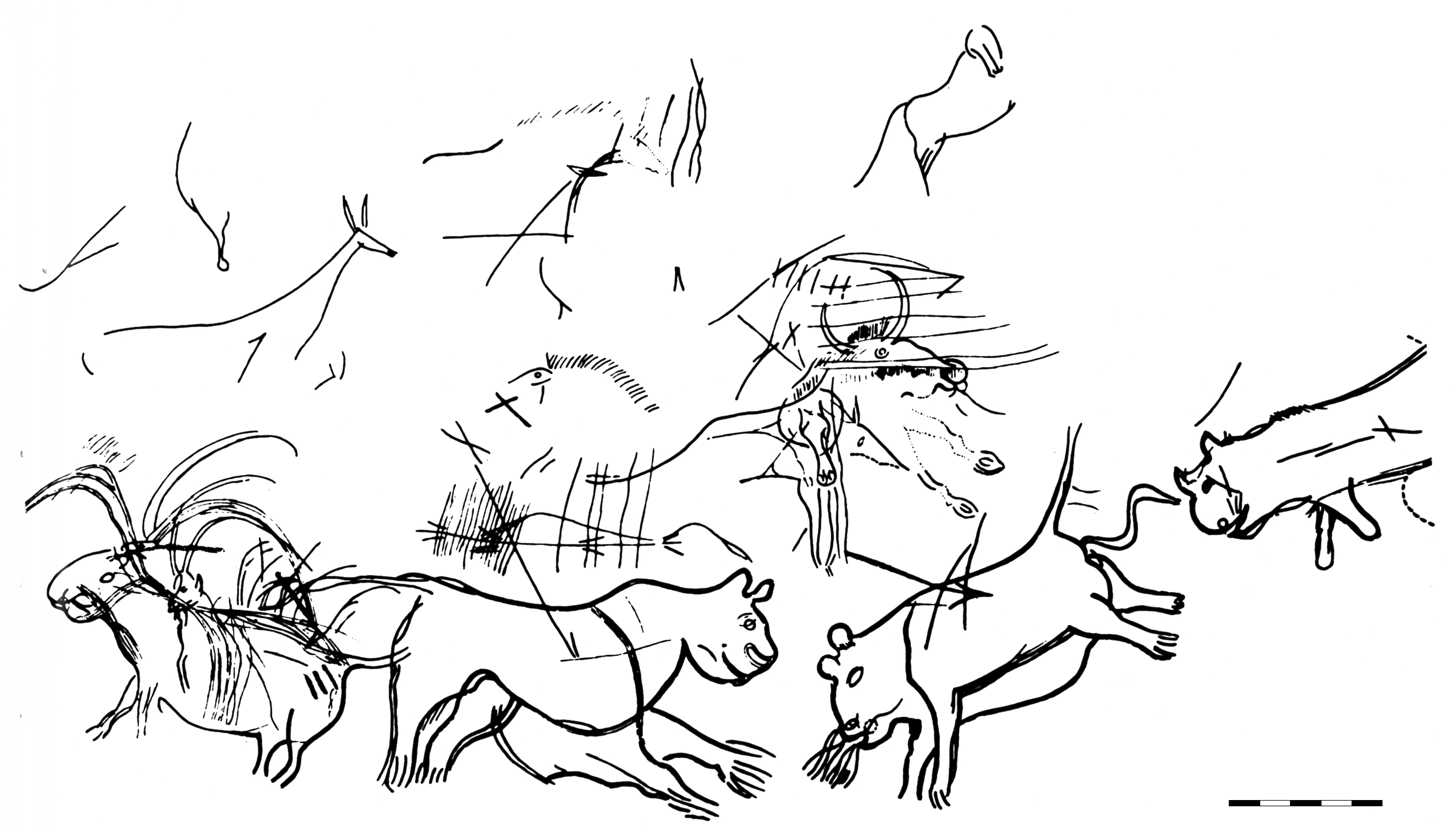
Drawing of cave lions in the Chamber of Felines, Lascaux caves

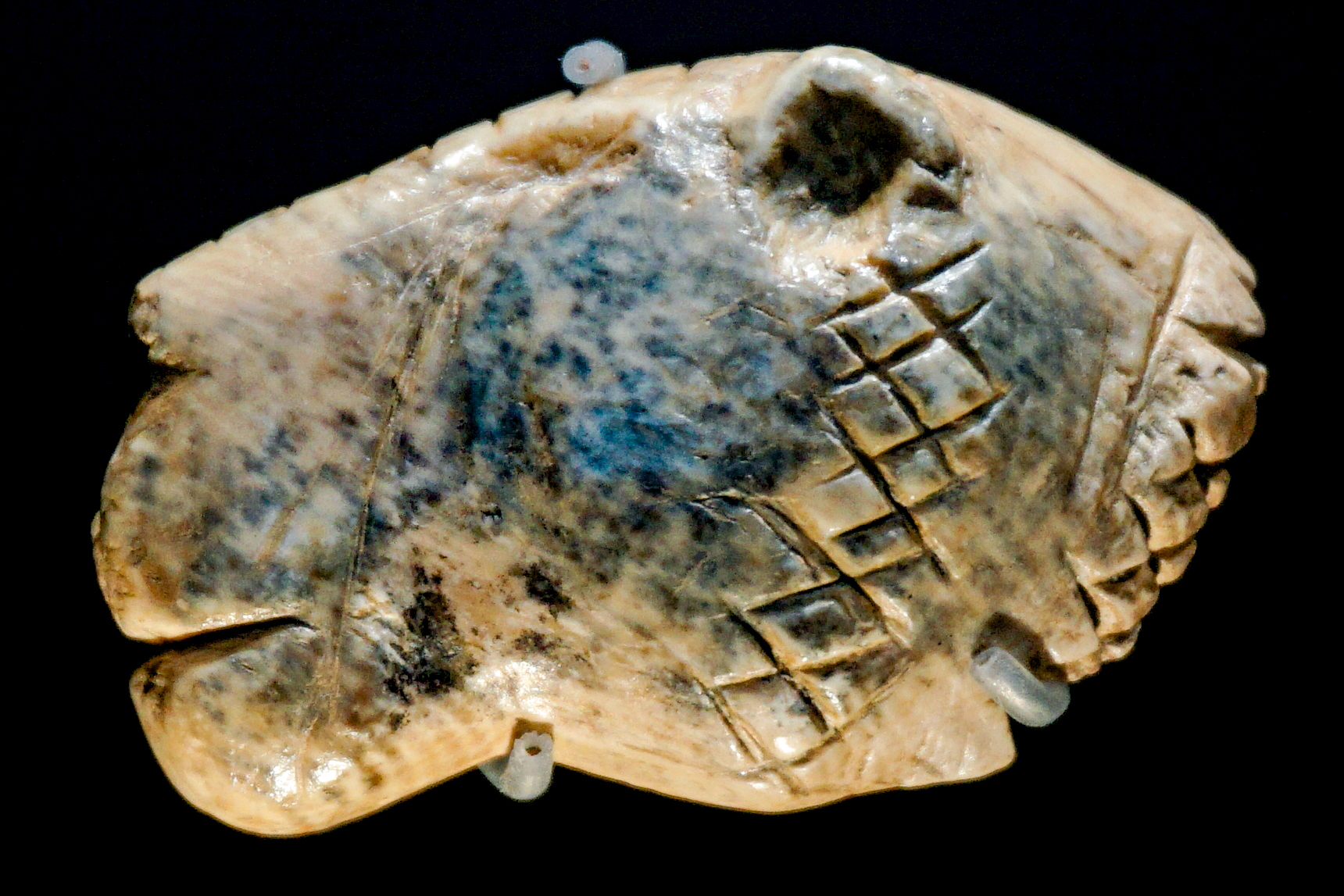
Carving of a Panthera spelaea head from Vogelherd Cave, dating to around 35–40,000 years ago

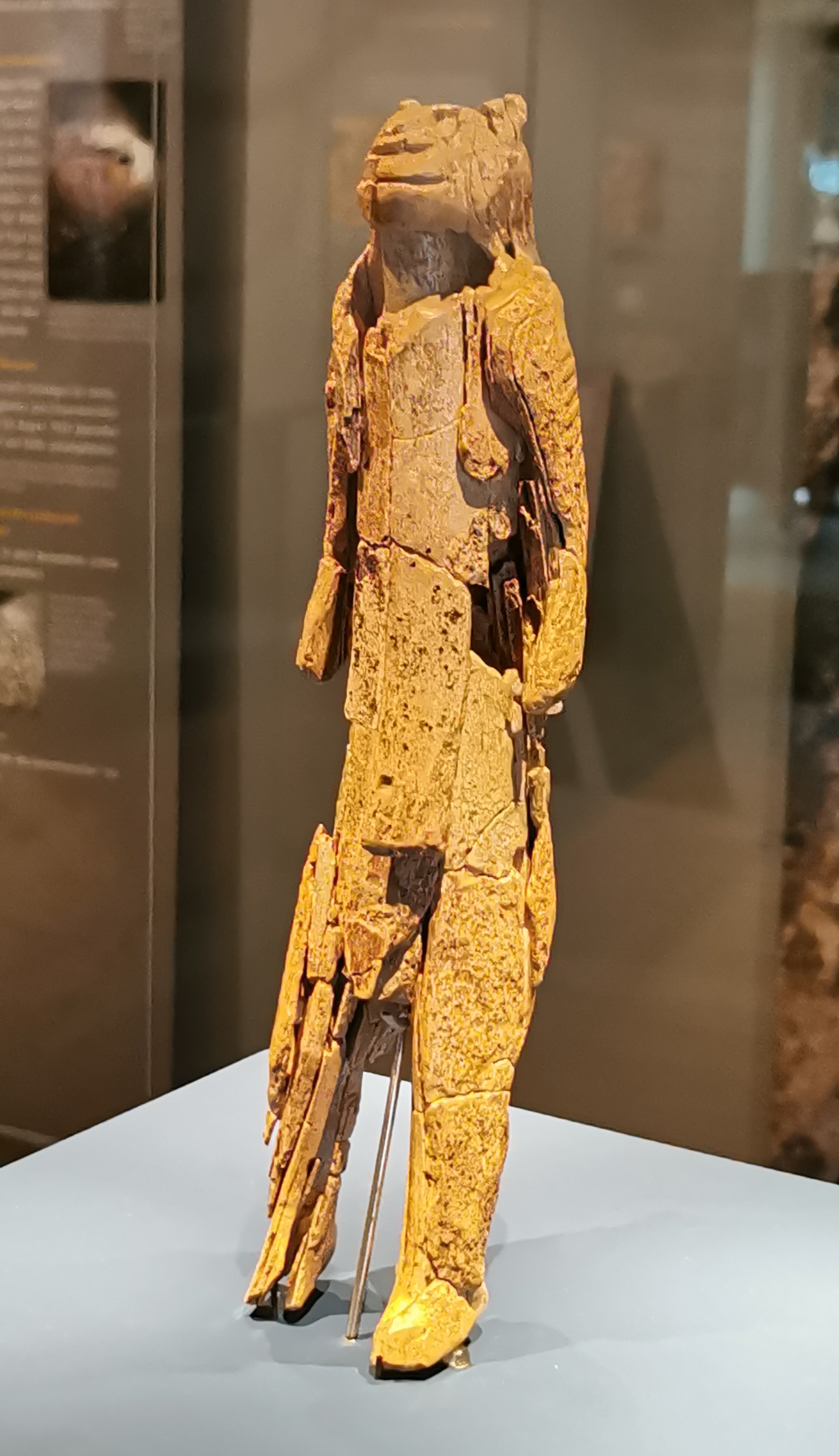
Anthropomorphic Lion-man of Hohlenstein-Stadel figurine, around 35-41,000 years old

The earliest evidence of human hunting and butchering of a cave lion (including P. fossilis) dates back to the Middle Pleistocene of Atapuerca, Spain c. 350,000-250,000 years ago. It continued to be practiced in later times by Neanderthals and modern humans alike. Findings of cave lion phalanges (hand bones) in archaeological layers from Einhornhöhle in Germany, dating to at least 190,000 years ago, are suggested to represent remains of a skinned cave lion pelt that had been transported to the site by Neanderthals. Cave lion bones at Scladina Cave in Belgium, dating to around 130,000 years ago, were fashioned by Neanderthals into tools that were used to retouch stone artifacts. At Siegsdorf in Germany, a cave lion skeleton dating to around 48,000 years ago has a puncture wound on the underside of a rib, suggested to have been produced when the cave lion was killed by a wooden spear thrust into its chest, again probably by Neanderthals, with cut marks found on other bones suggesting that it was subsequently butchered.

Following the arrival of modern humans into Europe into the Upper Paleolithic, they drew cave paintings of cave lions, engraved their likeness on bones and created sculptures of them, including the famous anthropomorphic lion-man (Löwenmensch) figure from Hohlenstein-Stadel cave in Germany dating to around 41–35,000 years ago with the body of a human and the head of a lion. Cave lion canines with perforated holes may have been worn as personal ornaments. Decorated stones with engravings representing cave lions have been found in southern Italy. Like Neanderthals, modern humans also utilized their pelts, as evidenced by phalanges found at the La Garma site in Spain dating to the Magdalenian, around 16,800 years ago. Some bones of cave lions found in Upper Paleolithic layers such as the Aurignacian and Gravettian of the Swabian Jura in southern Germany display cut marks and modification into tools. This may represent evidence of hunting, though evidence of hunting cave lions by modern humans during the Upper Paleolithic is uncommon.

== Extinction ==
The cave lion appears to have undergone a population bottleneck that considerably reduced its genetic diversity between 47,000 and 18,000 years ago, probably driven at least in part by climatic instability. Radiocarbon dating suggests that the species went extinct almost simultaneously across its range during the last few thousand years of the Late Pleistocene, around 14,000-15,000 years ago, likely surviving around 1000 years more in the far east North American portion of its range, until around 13,000 years ago. This timing roughly corresponds to the onset of the Bølling–Allerød Interstadial warm period and the consequent collapse of the mammoth steppe ecosystem. The precise cause of its extinction is unclear, but possibly involved environmental change from open habitats to closed forests, changes in prey abundance, as well as human impact, though it is difficult to disentangle the precise causes of its extinction. Competition with wolves may have been an important factor in its extinction.

The extinction formed part of the broader end-Pleistocene extinction event, in which most large terrestrial mammals globally became extinct, including many large carnivores.

== Mummified specimens ==
In 2008, a well-preserved mature cave lion specimen was unearthed near the Maly Anyuy River in Chukotka Autonomous Okrug, which still retained some clumps of hair.

In 2015, two frozen cave lion cubs, estimated to be between 25,000 and 55,000 years old, were discovered close to the Uyandina River in Yakutia, Siberia in permafrost. Research results indicate that the cubs were likely barely a week old at the time of their deaths, as their milk teeth had not fully erupted. Further evidence suggests the cubs were hidden at a den site until they were strong enough to follow their mother back to the pride, as with modern lions. Researchers believe that the cubs were trapped and killed by a landslide, and that the absence of oxygen underground hindered their decomposition and allowed the cubs to be preserved in such good condition. A second expedition to the site where the cubs were found was planned for 2016, in hopes of finding either the remains of a third cub or possibly the cubs' mother.

In 2017, another frozen specimen, thought to be a lion cub, was found in Yakutia on the banks of the Tirekhtyakh River (Russian: Тирехтях), a tributary of the Indigirka River. This male cub was thought to be slightly older than the 2015 cubs at the time of its death; it is estimated to have been around one and a half to two months. In 2018, another preserved carcass of a cub was found in a location 15 m (50 ft) away. It was considered to be around a month old when it died approximately 50,000 years ago, and presumed to be a sibling of the male cub. However, carbon dating showed them to have lived about 15,000 years apart, with the female estimated to have lived 28,000 years ago, and the male 43,448 years ago. Both cubs were well preserved, albeit with a few damages, with the female possibly being the "best preserved" animal discovered from the Ice age.

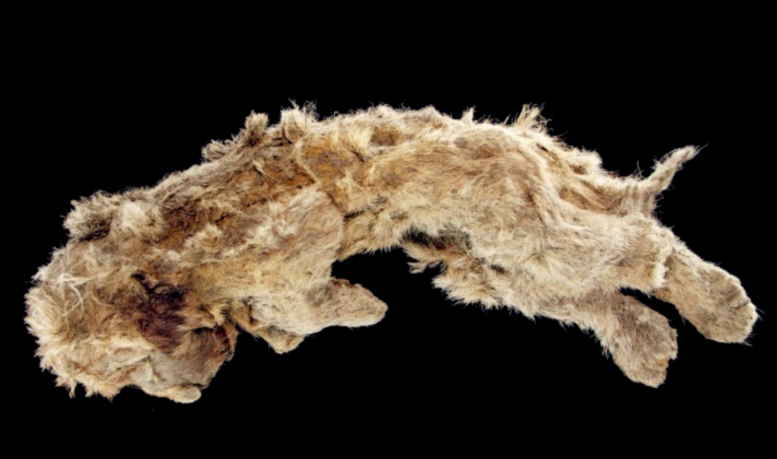
"Sparta", a 28,000 year old mummified female cave lion cub from the banks of the Semyuelyakh River in Siberia.

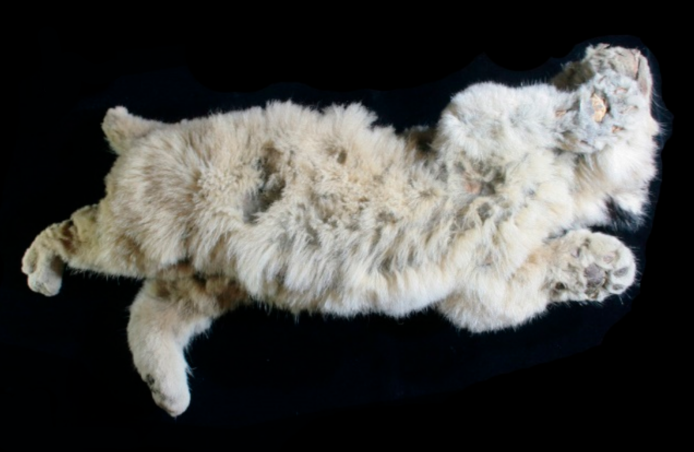
"Boris", a 44,000 year old mummified cave lion cub from the banks of the Semyuelyakh River in Siberia.

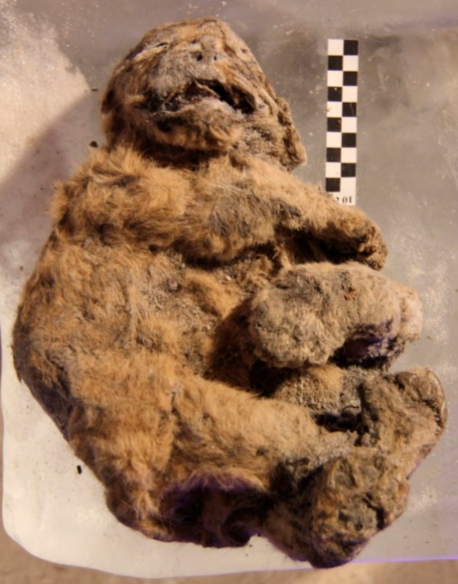
"Uyan", a 25,000-55,000 year old mummified cave lion cub from the Uyandina River, Yakutia.

== See also ==
- History of lions in Europe
- Megafauna
- Panthera atrox
- Panthera blytheae
- Panthera gombaszoegensis
- Panthera palaeosinensis
- Panthera shawi
- Panthera youngi
- Panthera zdanskyi
- Panthera leo sinhaleyus
- Panthera leo fossilis
