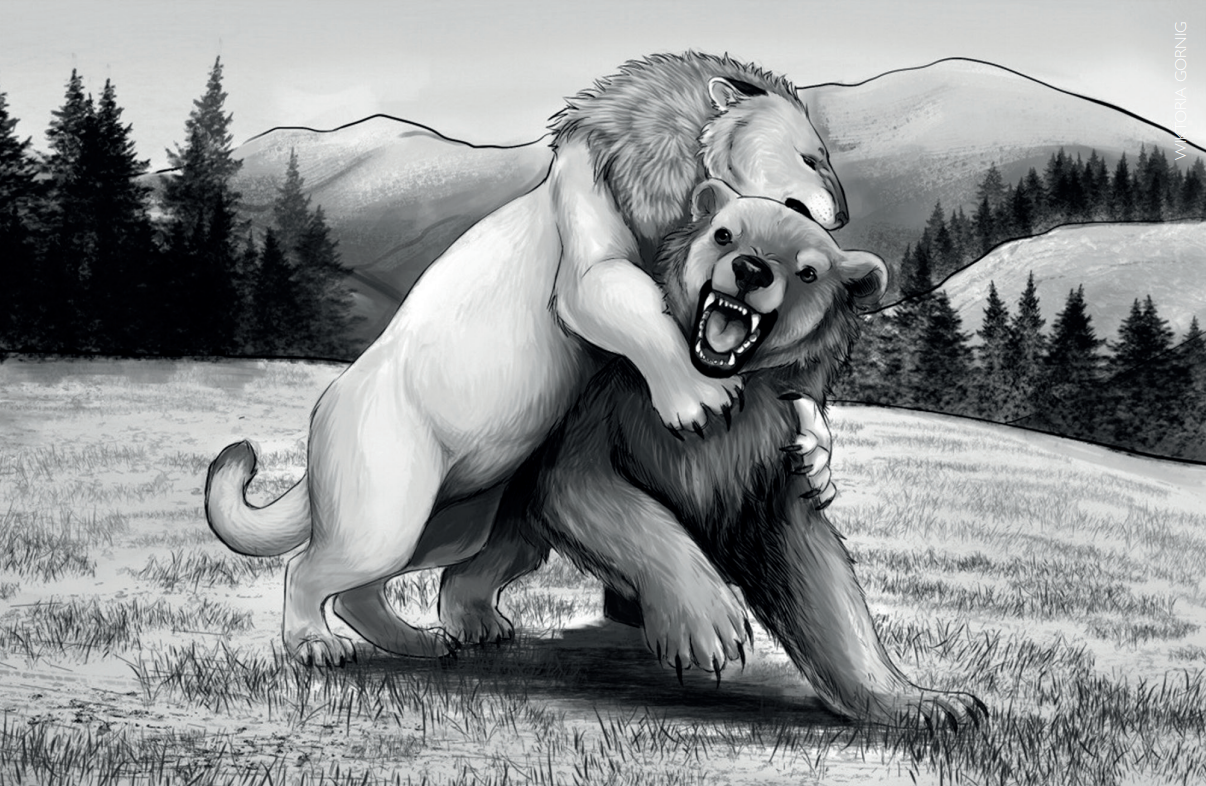
- Illustration of a steppe brown bear battling a cave lion

Scientific classification
- Kingdom: Animalia
- Phylum: Chordata
- Class: Mammalia
- Order: Carnivora
- Family: Ursidae
- Subfamily: Ursinae
- Genus: Ursus
- Species: U. arctos
- Subspecies: †U. a. priscus

Trinomial name
- †Ursus arctos priscus Goldfuß, 1818

Synonyms
- Ursus priscus; Ursus fossilis

= Steppe brown bear =

Steppe brown bear Temporal range: Pleistocene

Disputed extinct subspecies of brown bear

The steppe brown bear (Ursus arctos priscus) is a disputed extinct subspecies of brown bear that lived in Eurasia during either the Pleistocene or the early Holocene epochs, but its geological age is uncertain. Fossils of the bear have been found in various caves in Slovakia, particularly those of Vazec, Vyvieranie, Lisková, Kupcovie Izbicka, and Okno. Other authors have argued that the subspecies should be rendered invalid, as its geological age is unclear and "its skull is identical to modern U. arctos."

== Description ==
Adult males in average would have weighed 700–800 kg (1,500–1,800 lb), with the largest individuals weighing up to 1,000 kg (2,200 lb). It would have been more carnivorous than a modern brown bear, consuming 50 kg (110 lb) of meat per day.
