= History of lions in Europe =

Lions in prehistoric and historic Europe

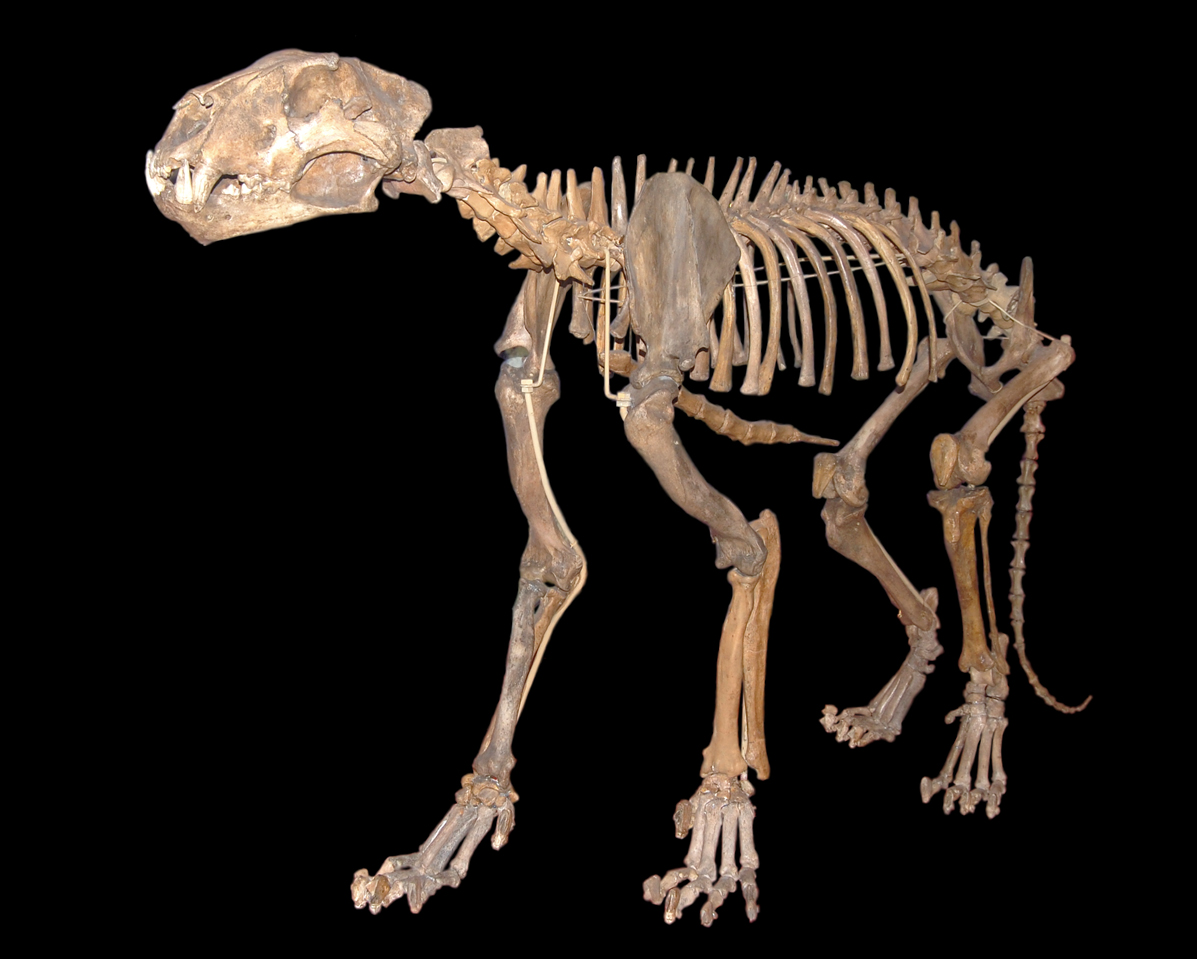
Skeleton of a cave lion (P. spelaea) in the Natural History Museum, Vienna

The history of lions in Europe is part of the wider history of the lion species complex. The rediscovery and confirmation of its presence in Europe, already known from myths, historical accounts and ancient art, was made possible by the finding of remains of Pleistocene and Holocene lions excavated in Europe since the early 19th century. The oldest remains of a lion in Europe, assigned to the species Panthera fossilis, are over 600,000 years old. This species represents one of the largest known felids to have ever existed; it eventually evolved into the smaller, modern lion-sized cave lion (Panthera spelaea), which is widely depicted in Palaeolithic European cave painting. Remains of P. fossilis and P. spelaea are known from across Europe. Cave lions became extinct around 14,000 years ago at the end of the Pleistocene. During the early-middle Holocene from around 8,000-6,000 years ago, the modern Asiatic lion colonised Southeast Europe and parts of Central and Eastern Europe, before becoming extinct in Europe likely during classical times, or as late as the Middle Ages.

Lions have appeared in European literature since the times of Ancient Greece, such as in the Iliad, or with the story of the Nemean lion. Ancient Greeks also depicted them in sculpture, such as with the Lion Gate of Mycenae or in the island-sanctuary of Delos, where various sculptures of lions survive to this day.

During the Roman Republic and later Roman Empire, using lions in gladiatorial games and public spectacles was a prized endeavor. North African Barbary lions were imported into Europe during the Middle Ages.

== Distribution ==
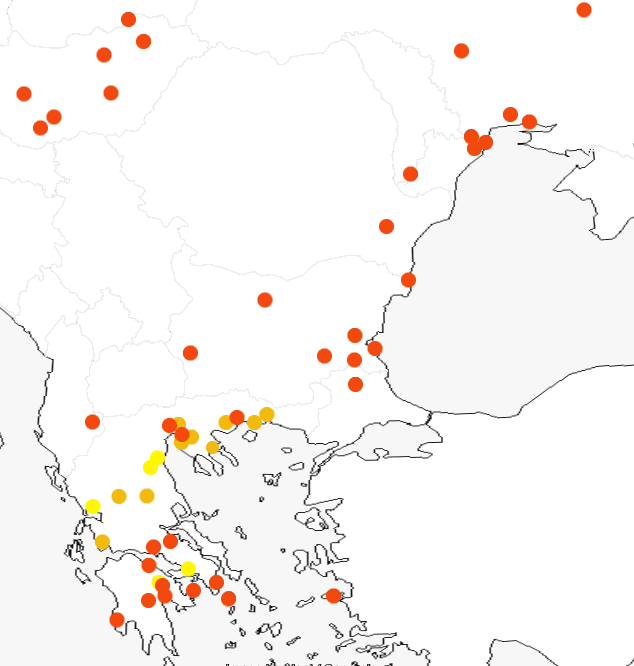
Records of modern lion in southeastern Europe
Red: excavated lion remains
Orange: locations mentioned by ancient Greek authors
Yellow: locations mentioned in Greek legends

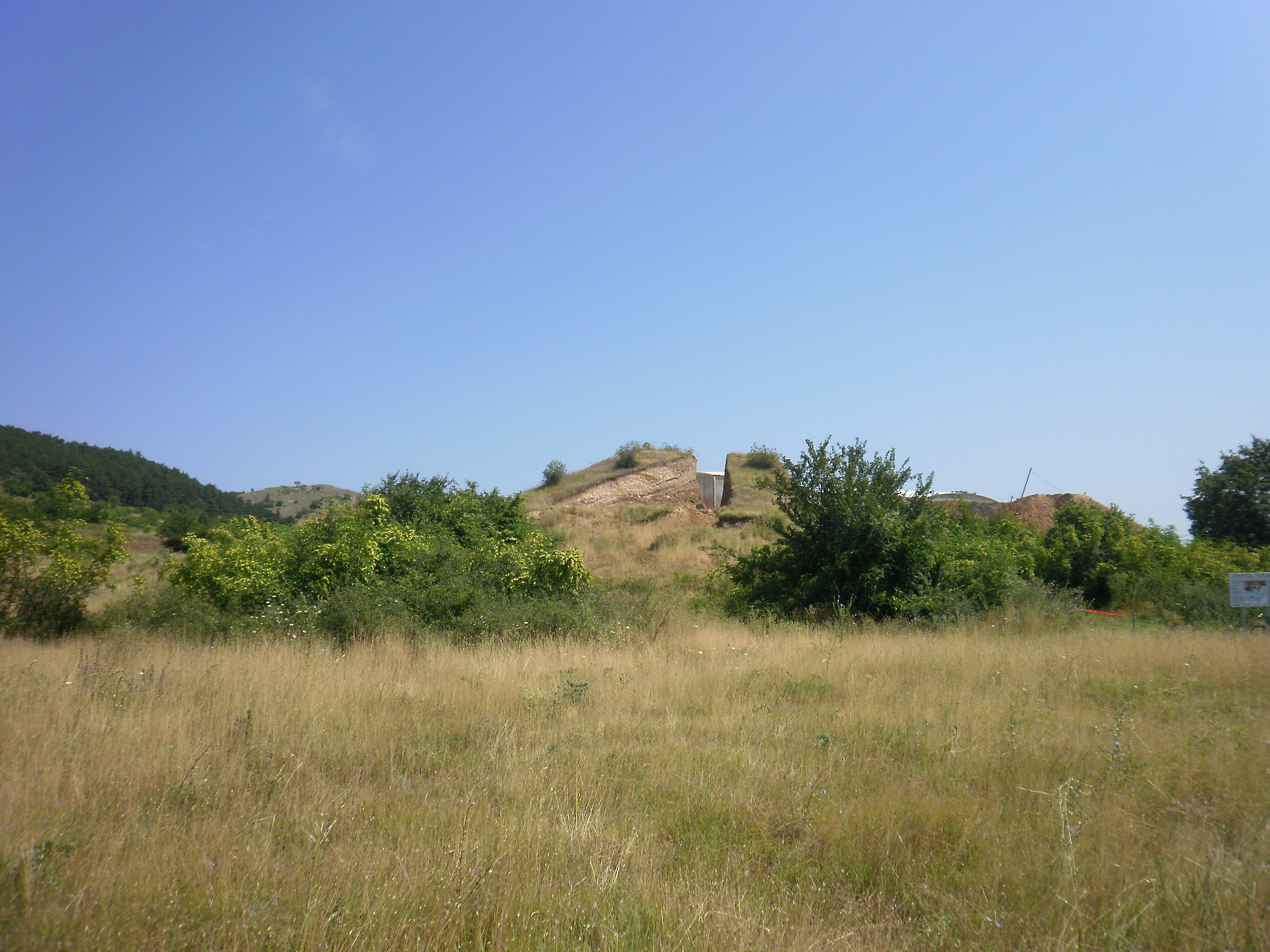
Karanovo, Nova Zagora Municipality in Bulgaria, where the fragments of a lion's tooth about 6,000 years old were found

=== Pleistocene records ===
Lions seem to have first evolved in east Africa around the Plio-Peistocene boundary (ca. 2 million years ago). The earliest remains of lions in Eurasia have been dated to around 1 million years ago, and lions became ubiquitous in Europe around 700-600,000 years ago. These fossils are classified as Panthera fossilis and Panthera (spelaea) fossilis. Some specimens have been estimated at around 500 kg (1,100 lb) in life, which would make Panthera fossilis one of the largest felids that ever lived. This lion was widespread in Europe and across Asia, eventually giving rise to the true cave lion (Panthera spelaea) of the later Pleistocene, which was still large, but experienced a drastic size reduction during the late Pleistocene around 50 to 45,000 years ago. The range of the cave lion seems to have collapsed across Eurasia around 14,000 years ago, and its extinction around the same time is to be considered within the broader context of the Late Pleistocene extinctions and the collapse of the mammoth steppe.

=== Holocene records ===
Although there are some claimed records of early Holocene cave lion fossils from Italy, the dating of these fossils are uncertain. The oldest confirmed remains of modern lion in Europe date to the early Holocene, around 8,000-6,000 years ago. European Holocene lions are suggested to represent part of the same population as living Asiatic lions.

A Neolithic lion tooth fragment representing the Atlantic Period was found in Karanovo, Bulgaria, and is estimated 6,000 years old. In Greece, lions first appeared around 6,500–6,000 years ago as indicated by a front leg bone found in Philippi. Bone fragments of the modern lion were excavated in Hungary and in Ukraine's Black Sea region, which are estimated at around 5,500 to 3,000 years old. Remains were also found in Romania and European Turkey. A human skeleton found near the Kozareva mound (Eastern Bulgaria) and dating to ca. 4600–4200 BC, bears lesions that indicate a big carnivore attack, most likely done by a lion.

=== Historic range of Panthera leo ===
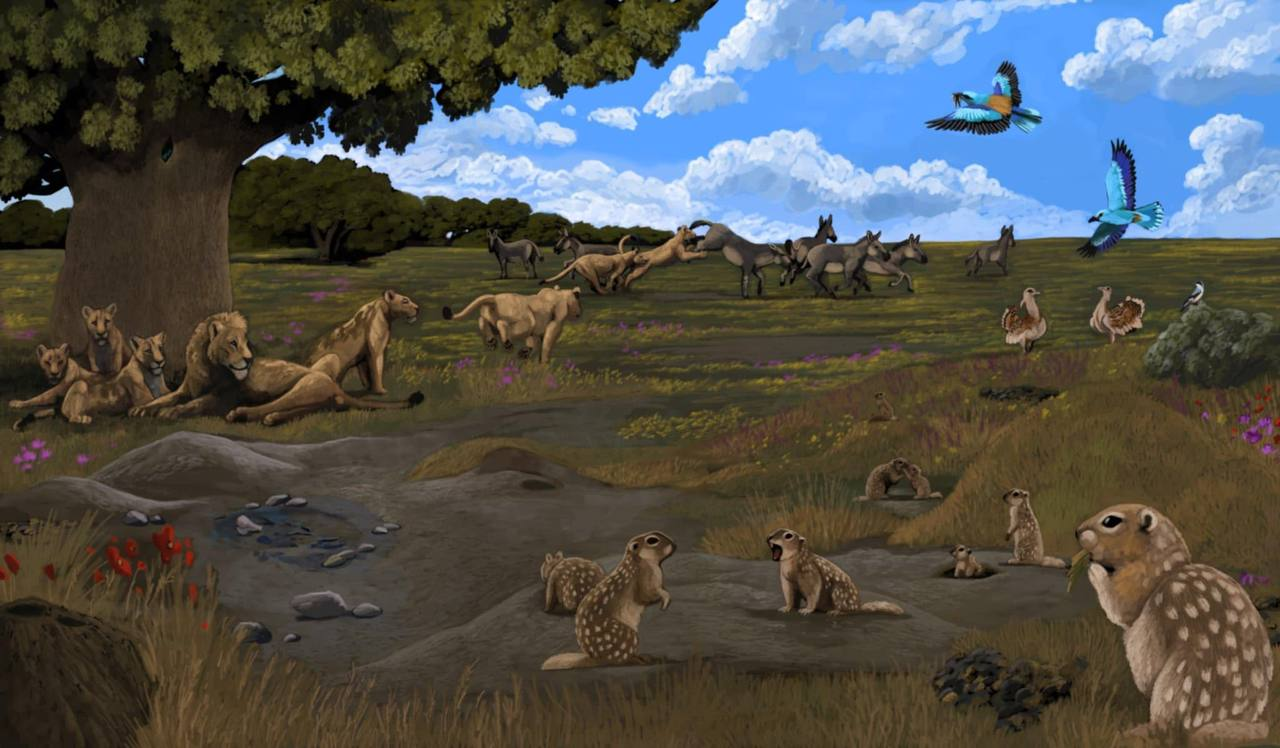
A Pannonian early-mid Holocene scene, featuring, from left to right, Asiatic lions, European wild ass, Pannonian sousliks, European rollers, great bustards and a lesser grey shrike.

In Southeast Europe, the modern lion (Panthera leo) inhabited part of the Balkan Peninsula as well as adjacent areas, ranging northwestwards to Hungary and eastwards Ukraine during the Neolithic period. It survived in Bulgaria until the 4th or 3rd century BC. Around 1000 BC, it became extinct in the Peloponnese. It disappeared from Macedonia around the first century AD, from Western Thrace not before the 2nd century AD and from Thessaly possibly in the 4th century CE; Themistius regretted that no more lions could be furnished for beast-shows. Some authors have argued that the lion may have survived in Ukraine as late as the High Middle Ages, based on a report of the 12th century Kievan Rus' prince Vladimir Monomakh encountering a 'fierce beast', which some have conjectured to be a lion. Some records potentially belonging to Panthera leo have been reported from the early Holocene of the northern Iberian Peninsula and Northern Italy, including Cueva La Riera in Spain and Grotta all'Onda in Italy, though these fossils are poorly dated and fragmentary, making it impossible from morphology to determine whether they represent modern P. leo or cave lions.

In Transcaucasia, the lion was present until the 10th century. The peak of its historic range covered all of the plains and foothills of eastern Transcaucasia, westward almost to Tbilisi in modern Georgia. Northwards, its range extended through the eastern Caucasus, from the Apsheron Peninsula to the mouth of the Samur River near the current Azerbaijan-Russia border, extending to the Araks river. From there, the boundary of its range narrowly turned east to Yerevan in modern Armenia, with its northern boundary then extending westward to Turkey.

== In culture ==
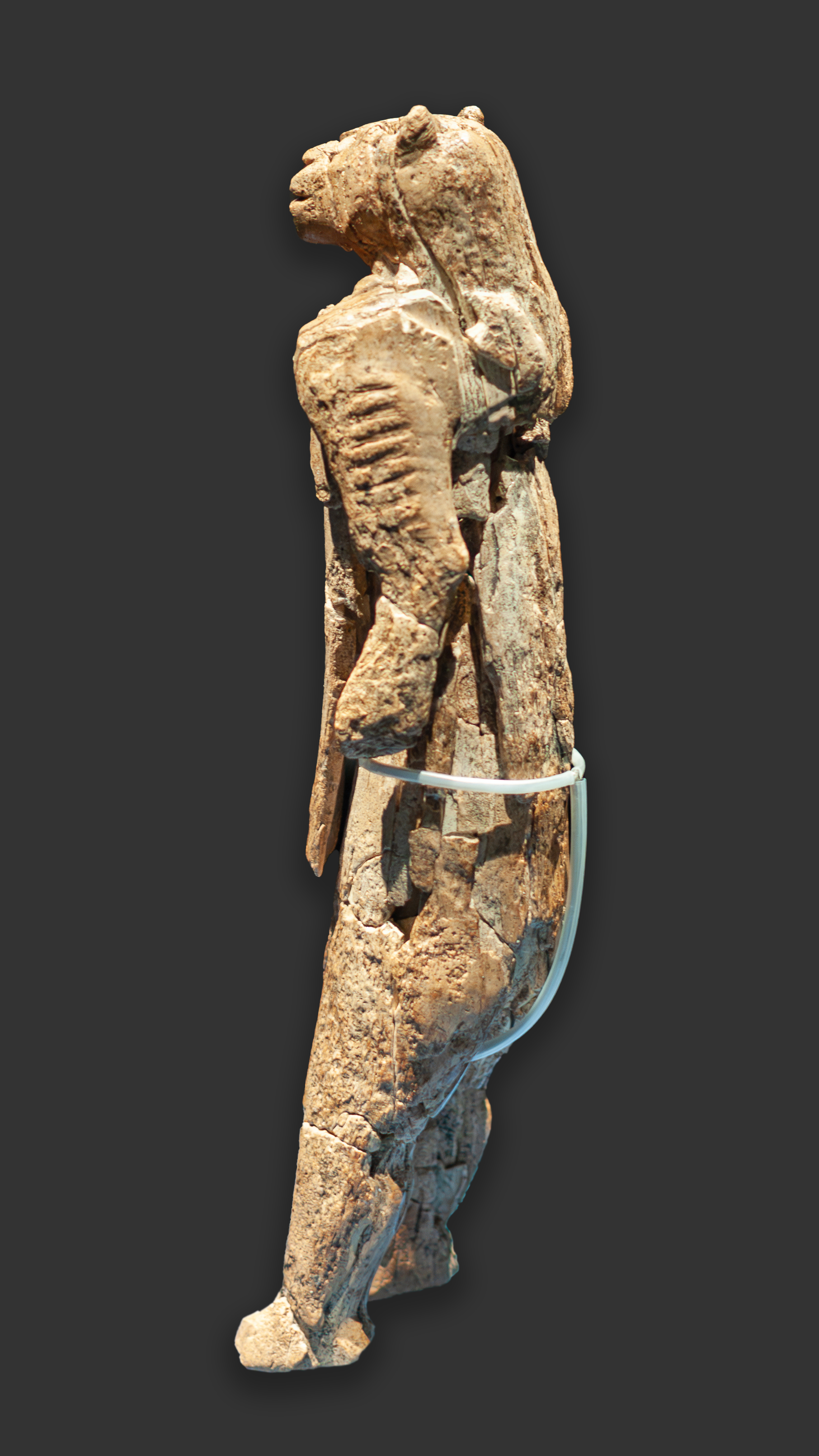
The anthropomorphic Löwenmensch figurine

Cave lions feature in a number of works of Palaeolithic art, though depictions are comparatively rare. These include cave paintings, engravings, and sculptures, notably including the anthropomorphic Lion-man of Hohlenstein-Stadel figurine with a human-like body and a cave lion head.

Lions feature in ancient Greek mythology and writings, including the myth of the Nemean lion, which was believed to be a supernatural lion that occupied the sacred town of Nemea in the Peloponnese. Homer mentioned lions 45 times in his poems, but this could have been due to his experience in Asia Minor. Phalaecus, a tyrant of Ambracia, modern-day Arta, was allegedly killed by a female lion due to him holding a newborn lion cub, after finding it on a hunting expedition. Conon refers to the myth of how the city of Olynthus got its name around the period of the Trojan War, when Olynthos, son of King Strymon, was killed by a lion during a lion hunt. According to Herodotus, lions occurred between Achelous river and Nestus, being plentiful between Akanthos and Thermi. When Xerxes advanced near Echedorus in 480 BC, the troops' camels were attacked by lions. Xenophon stated around 400 BC that lions were hunted around Mount Kissos, Pangaio, the Pindus mountains and elsewhere. Aristotle in the 4th century BC provided some data on lion distribution, behaviour, breeding and also anatomy. According to him, lions were more numerous in North Africa than in Europe; they had approached towns, and attacked people only if they were old, or had poor dental health. Pliny the Elder mentions that European lions were stronger compared to those from Syria and Africa. In the 2nd century AD, Pausanias referred to lion presence east of Nestus in Thrace, in the area of Abdera. He also referred to a story about Polydamas of Skotoussa, an Olympic winner in the 5th century BC, who allegedly used his bare hands to kill a lion on Thessalian part of Mount Olympus; the legend of Mermerus who was killed during a hunt by a lioness, opposite Corfu; and to one about Caranus of Macedon who according to the Macedonians, raised a trophy that was thrown down and destroyed by a lion that was rushing down from Mount Olympus.

The Romans used Barbary lions from North Africa for lion-baiting, and lions from Greece for gladiatorial games.

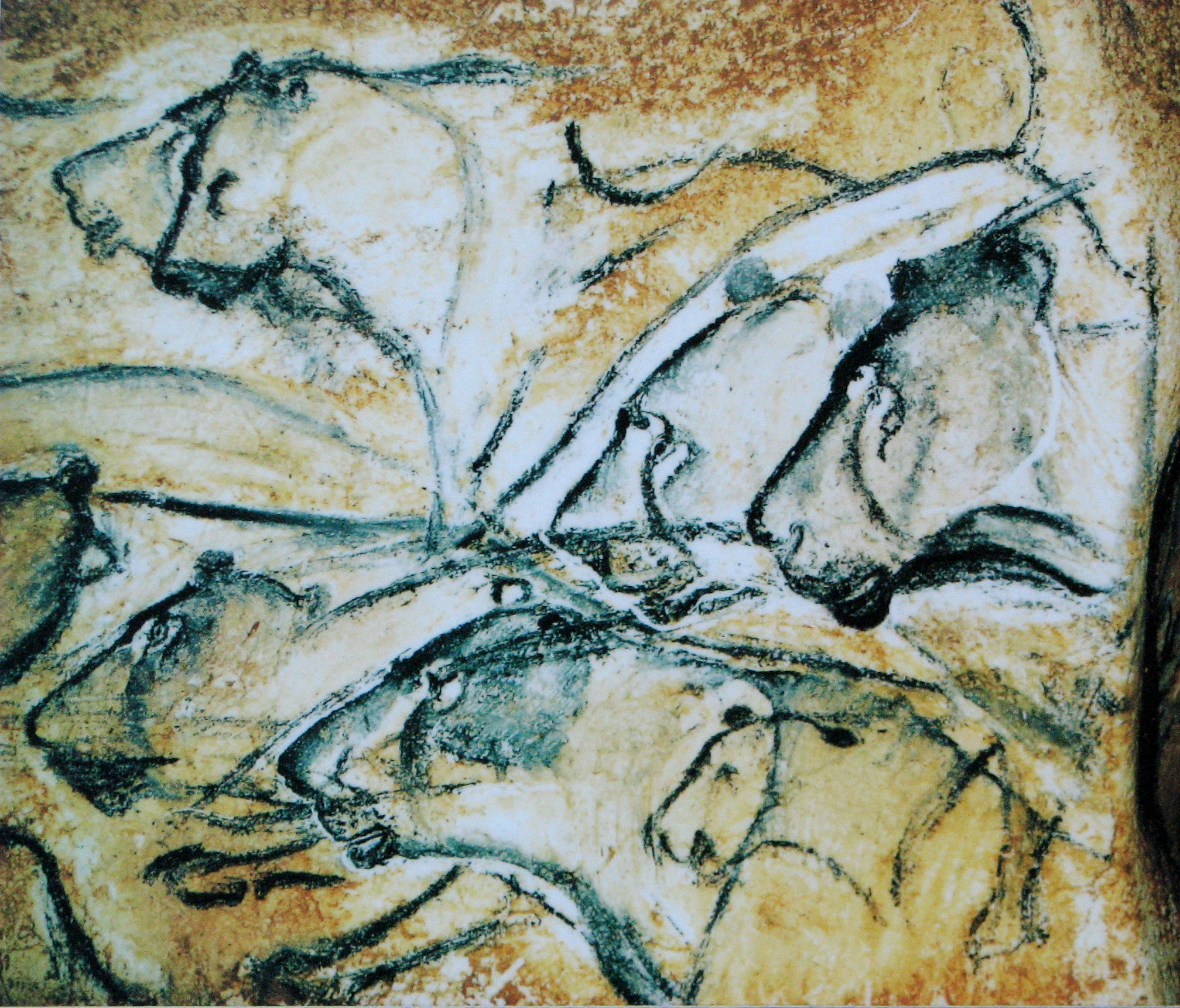
Upper Paleolithic cave painting depicting cave lions, found in the Chauvet Cave, France

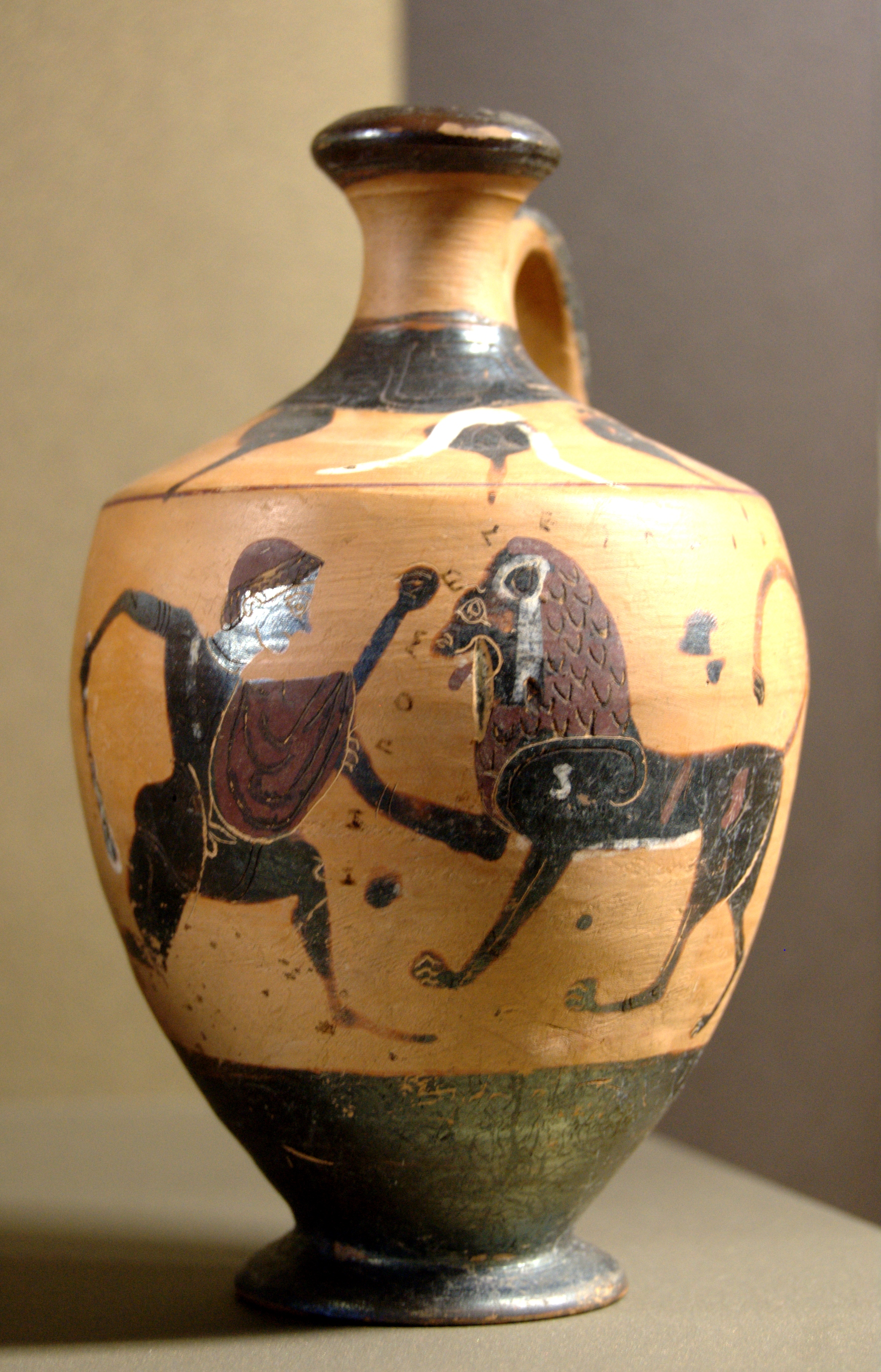
Heracles and the Nemean lion, c. 540 BC, Boeotia, Greece

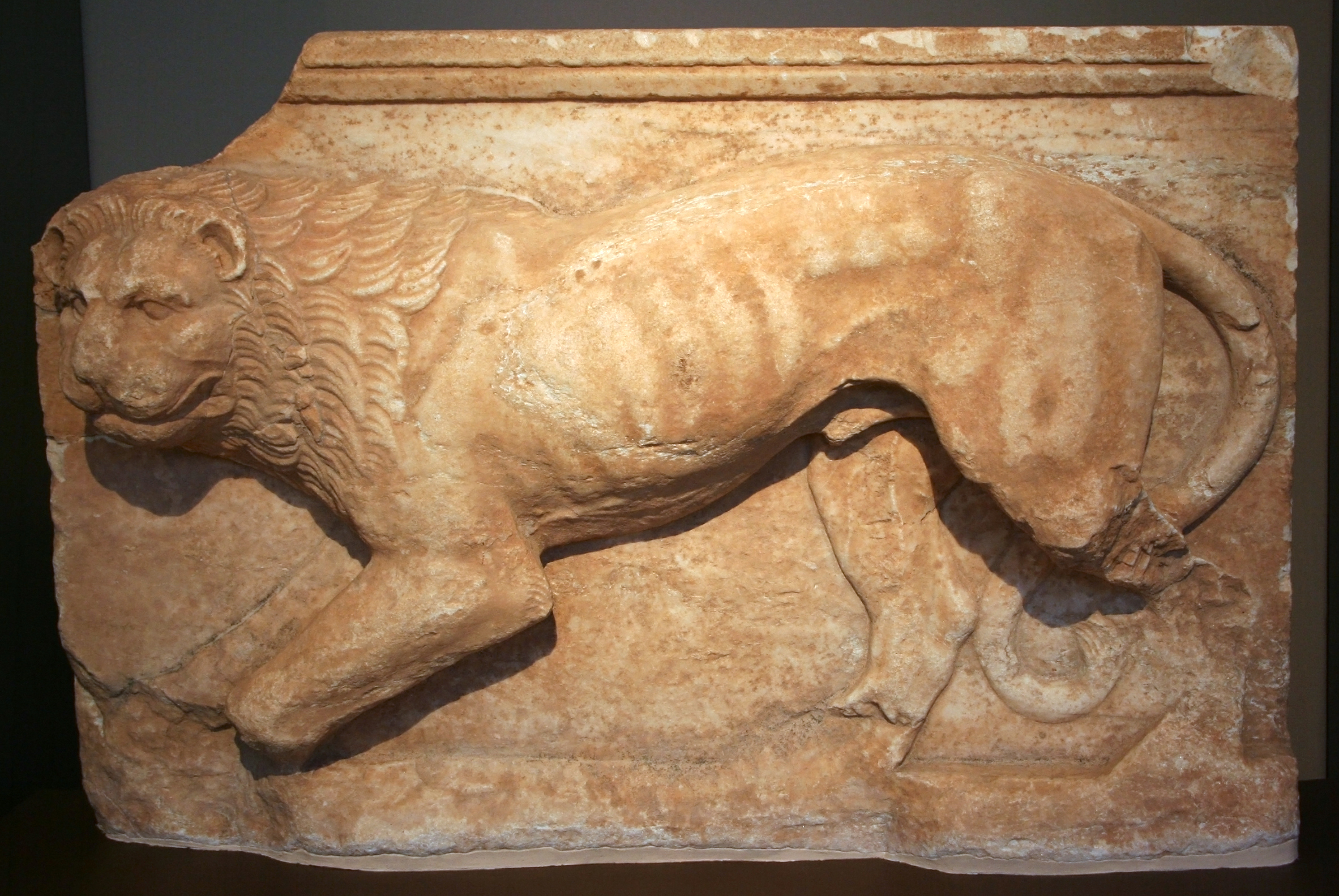
Lion sculpture, 4th century BC, Koropi, Greece

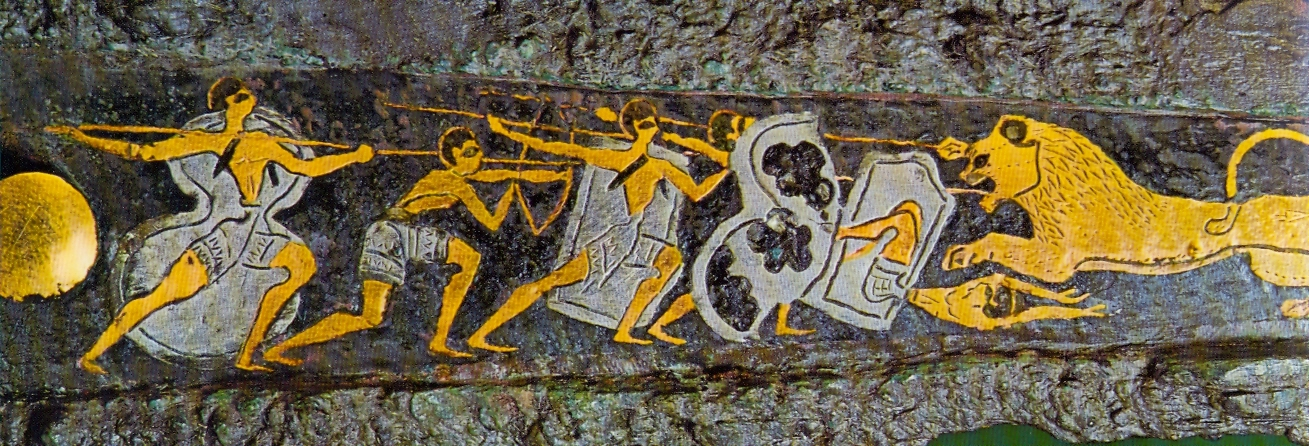
Depiction of a hunting scene on a dagger found in Mycenae, Greece, 16th century BC

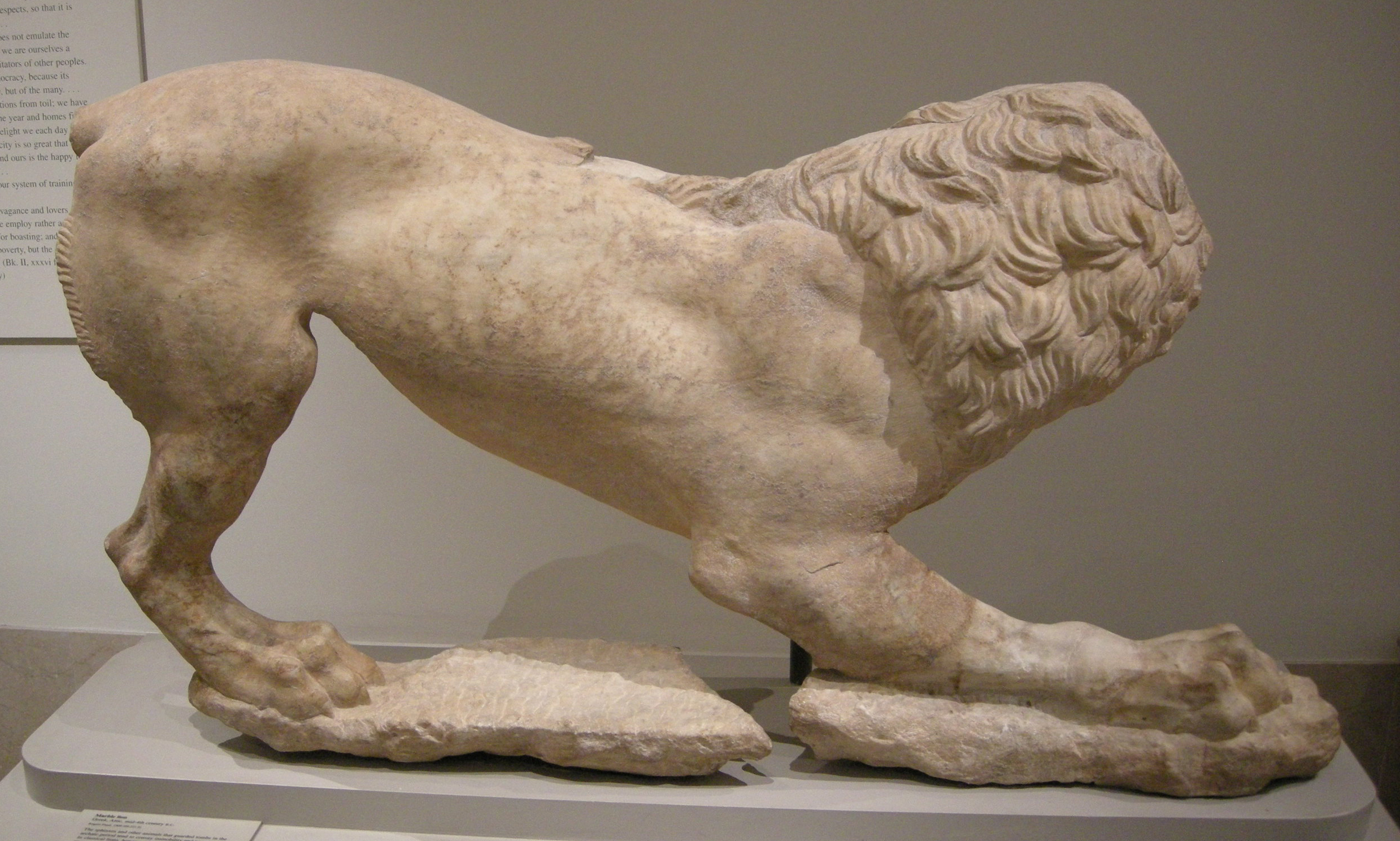
Marble lion from Greece, mid-4th century BC

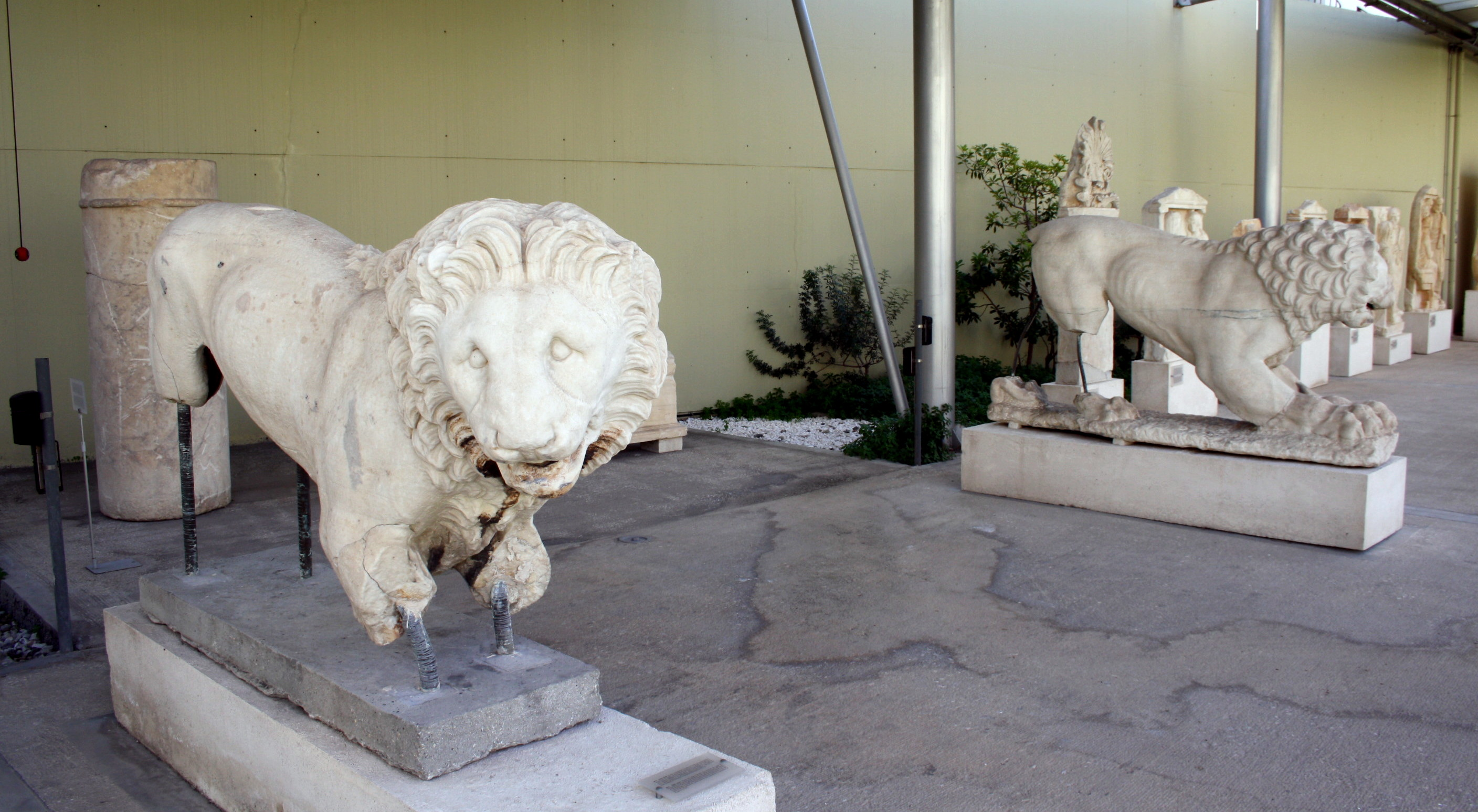
Depiction of the lion from the 4th century BC, Greece

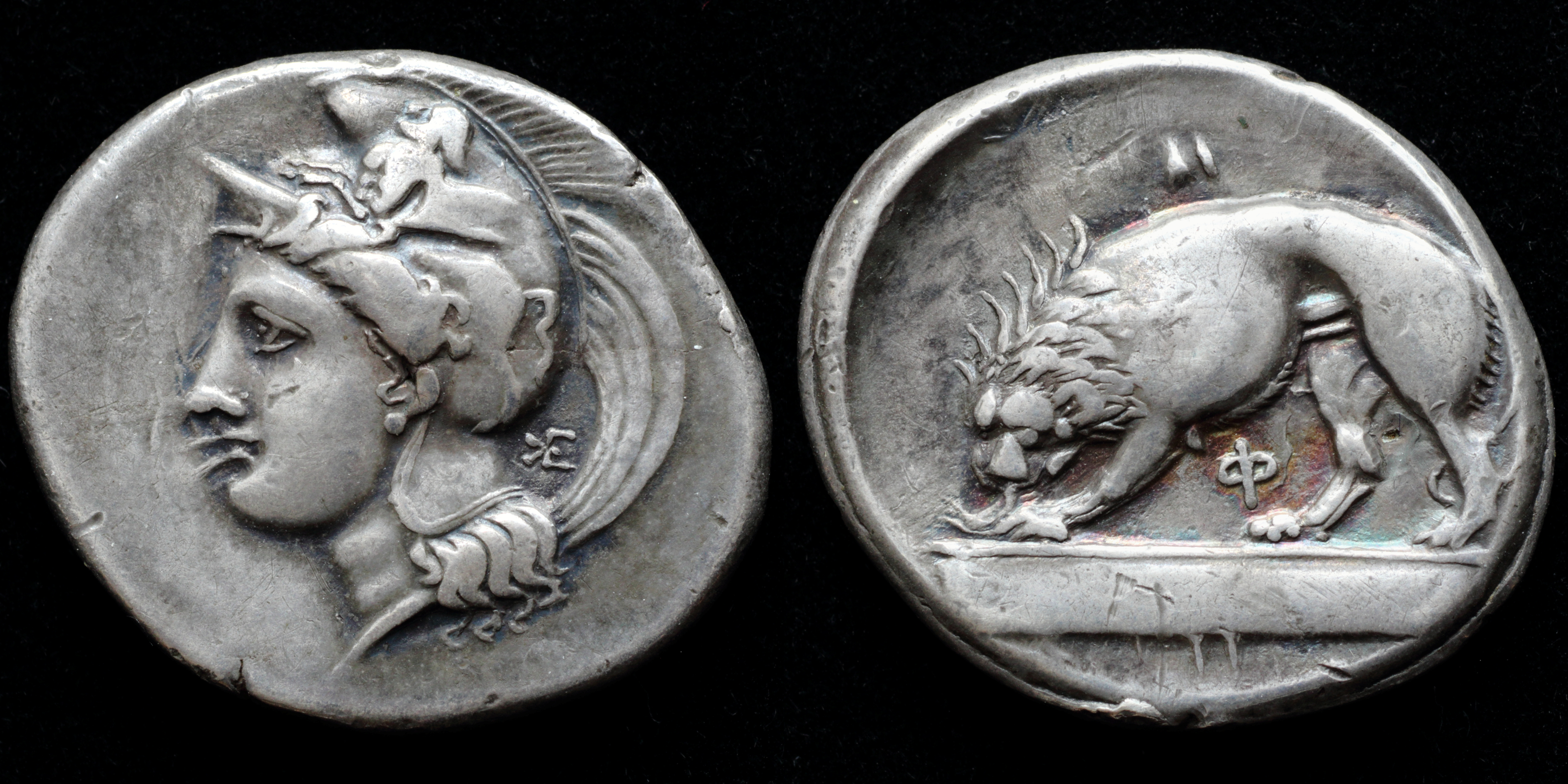
Silver stater struck in Velia 334-300 BC depicting Athena wearing a Phrygian helmet decorated with a centaur and lion devouring prey

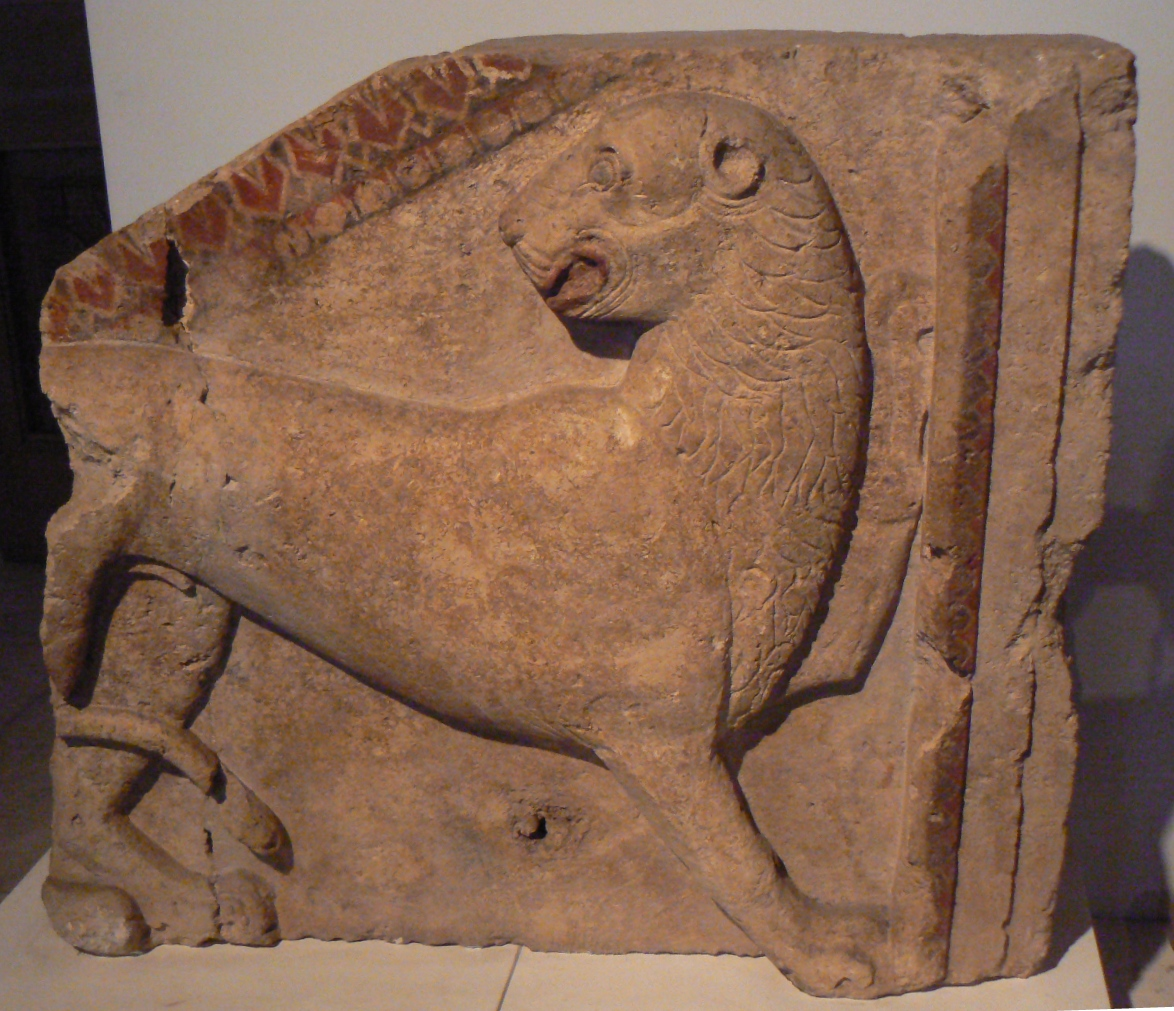
Stone relief of a lion with a polychrome decorations, Zhaba Mogila, Strelcha, Bulgaria, 5th century BC.

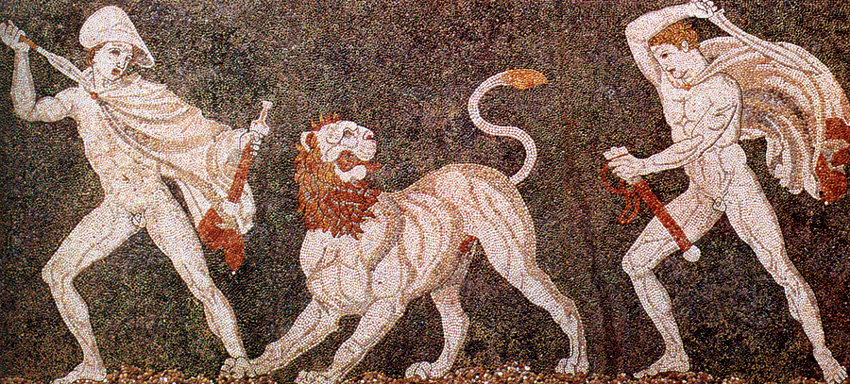
Mosaic from Pella (ancient Macedonia), late 4th century BC, depicting Alexander the Great and Craterus.

== See also ==
- Panthera leo leo
- Asiatic lion
- Cape lion
- Barbary lion
- Panthera atrox
- Cultural depictions of lions
