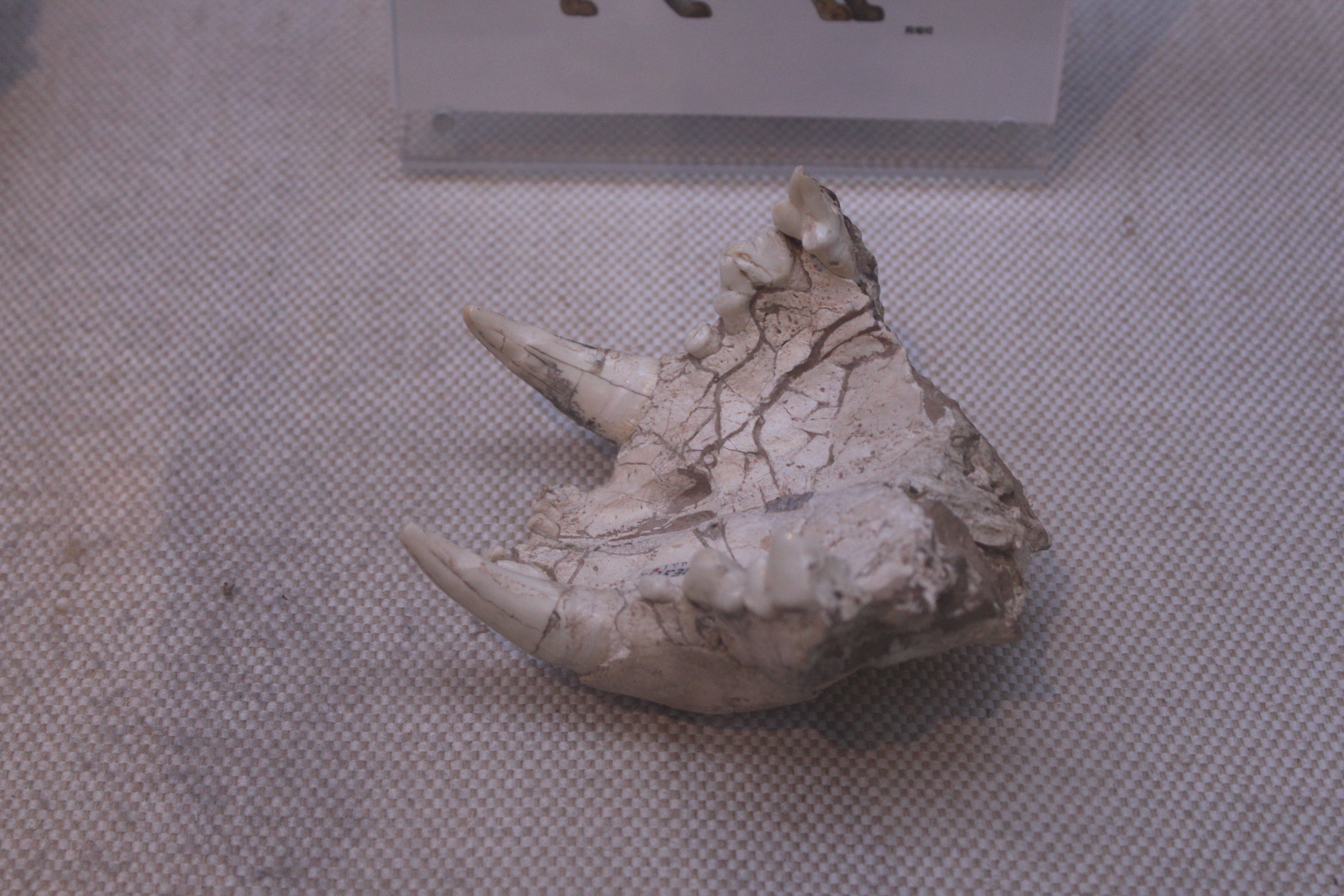
- Partial skull (IVPP V13538), Paleozoological Museum of China

Scientific classification
- Kingdom: Animalia
- Phylum: Chordata
- Class: Mammalia
- Order: Carnivora
- Family: Felidae
- Genus: Panthera
- Species: †P. palaeosinensis

Binomial name
- †Panthera palaeosinensis (Zdansky, 1924)

Synonyms
- Felis palaeosinensis Zdansky, 1924; Panthera zdanskyi? Mazák, Christiansen & Kitchener, 2011

= Panthera palaeosinensis =

Panthera palaeosinensis Temporal range: Early Pleistocene, 2.5–1.9 Ma

Extinct species of carnivore

Panthera palaeosinensis is an extinct species of big cat belonging to the genus Panthera known from the Pleistocene of northern China. It is often incorrectly referenced as the ancestor of the tiger, Panthera tigris, although it shares features with all living large cats. Recent studies place it close to the base of the genus Panthera.

Panthera palaeosinensis was first described in 1924 as Felis paleosinensis by Otto Zdansky in his work "Jungtertiäre Carnivoren Chinas". The dating is not certain, but estimates place it around the Plio-Pleistocene boundary at two to three million years old. Panthera paleosinensis's skull has an A-P length of 262 mm (10.3 in) and a mandibular length of 169 mm (6.7 in) and the living creature would have appeared like a jaguar, stout and strong. The conical upper canines were not present in the fossil, but the lower canines bear the vertical grooves typical of Panthera.

As of 2025, at least three recent studies considered Panthera zdanskyi likely to be a synonym of P. palaeosinensis, noting that its proposed differences from that species fell within the range of individual variation. In 2026, Jiangzuo and colleagues suggested that P. palaeosinensis may be ancestral to the extant tiger (Panthera tigris).
