= Panthera leo sinhaleyus =

Panthera leo sinhaleyus Temporal range: Pleistocene

Scientific classification
- Kingdom: Animalia
- Phylum: Chordata
- Class: Mammalia
- Infraclass: Placentalia
- Order: Carnivora
- Family: Felidae
- Genus: Panthera
- Species: P. leo
- Subspecies: †P. l. sinhaleyus

Trinomial name
- †Panthera leo sinhaleyus Deraniyagala, 1938

Extinct subspecies of carnivoran

Panthera leo sinhaleyus is an extinct prehistoric subspecies of lion, excavated in Sri Lanka. It is believed to have become extinct prior to the arrival of humans c. 37,000 years BCE.

== History and taxonomy ==
In 1938, the paleontologist Paulus Deraniyagala named a new prehistoric subspecies of lion, Panthera leo sinhaleyus, based on a single left lower carnassial (m1) tooth excavated from deposits in Kuruwita as the holotype. It was recorded as specimen BMNH M51883 in the British Museum Natural History collections. The subspecific name sinhaleyus is derived from the Sinhala term "Sinharaja", meaning Royal Lion Forest, which itself reflects historical legends of lions inhabiting Sri Lanka.

A second fossil was discovered in 1947 approximately four miles from the site of the holotype, in what was thought to be the same stratigraphic layer. This fossil, a right lower canine tooth (Rathnapura Museum F43A), was poorly preserved. That same year Deriyangala assigned it to P. l. sinhaleyus.

It was further described, but named only as Panthera leo, in a 2005 study of felid fossils from the Kuruwita site.

== Description ==
Deraniyagala called the holotype "narrower and more elongate" but otherwise provided little information on what distinguished P. l. sinhaleyus from other lion subspecies, and distinguished it only from the teeth of tigers by its larger size. The 2005 study also described it in more detail.

== Paleobiology and paleoecology ==
Rodrigo and Bohingamuwa in 2025 hypothesized that P. l. sinhaleyus inhabited the lowland wet zones of Sri Lanka, which have dense vegetation and plentiful water sources. It likely lived alongside the Rathnapura fauna, which included the Sri Lankan leopard subspecies, elephants Hypselephas hysudricus, Palaeoloxodon namadicus, and Elephas maximus sinhaleyus, and the hippopotamus Hexaprotodon sivalensis.

== See also ==
- Asiatic lion
- Panthera fossilis
