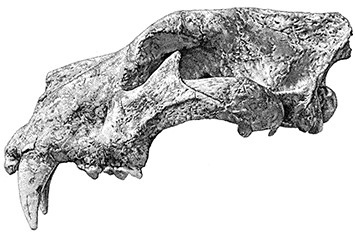
- Skull from Azé, France
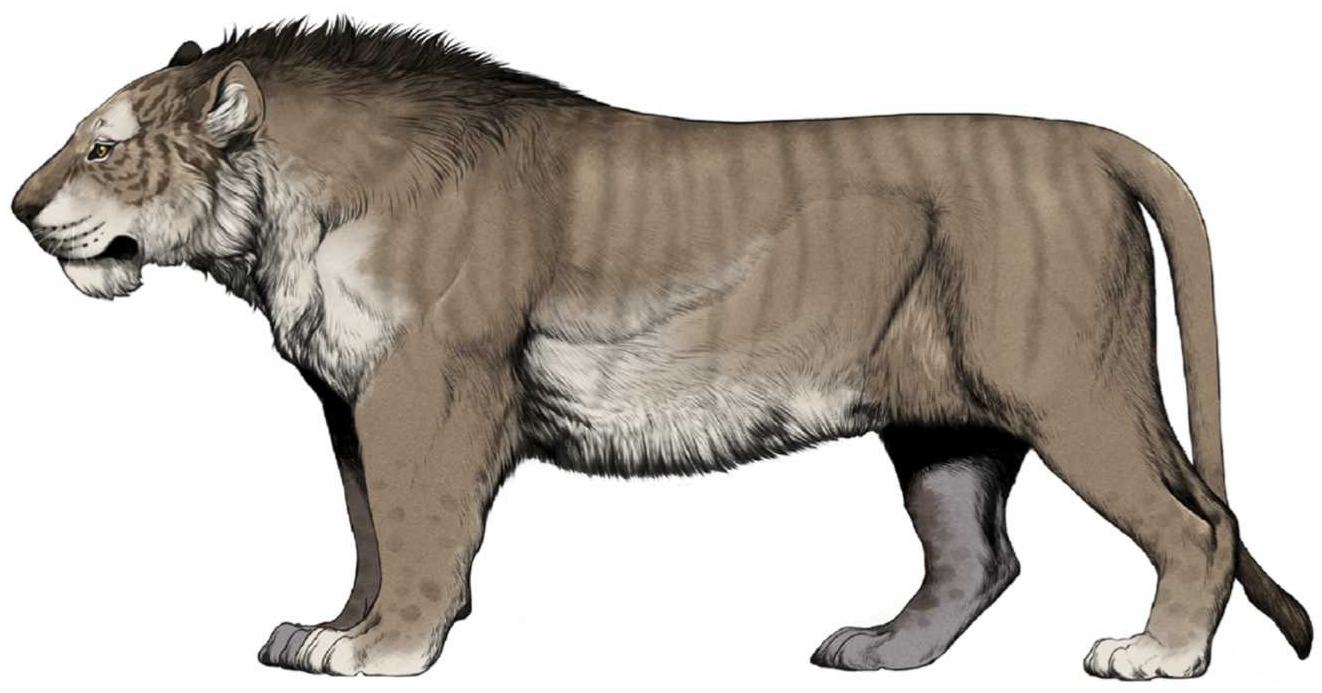
- Life restoration

Scientific classification
- Kingdom: Animalia
- Phylum: Chordata
- Class: Mammalia
- Order: Carnivora
- Family: Felidae
- Genus: Panthera
- Species: †P. fossilis

Binomial name
- †Panthera fossilis (Reichenau, 1906)

Synonyms
- Panthera leo fossilis; Panthera spelaea fossilis

= Panthera fossilis =

Panthera fossilis Temporal range: Middle Pleistocene 0.7–0.3 Ma Possible Early Pleistocene records.

Extinct species of lion

Panthera fossilis, also known as Panthera leo fossilis and Panthera spelaea fossilis, is an extinct species of felid belonging to the genus Panthera known from fossil remains found in Eurasia spanning the Middle Pleistocene, with possible Early Pleistocene records.

Although often historically considered a subspecies of the living lion (Panthera leo), Panthera fossilis is currently considered either a distinct species that is ancestral to, or a chronosubspecies of, Panthera spelaea (with both P. fossilis and P. spelaea having the common name "cave lion"). In comparison to Late Pleistocene Panthera spelaea specimens, Panthera fossilis tends to be considerably larger, up to 400–500 kg (880–1,100 lb), considerably exceeding modern lions in size, and making them among the largest cats to have ever lived, along with the South American sabertooth Smilodon populator.

== Taxonomic history ==
The species was first described by Wilhelm von Reichenau in 1906 from remains excavated near Mauer in Germany. P. fossilis was historically considered a modern lion (P. leo) subspecies as Panthera leo fossilis. The placement of Panthera fossilis and its descendant Panthera spelaea as subspecies of the modern lion has been strongly questioned in recent scholarship, due to the genetic distinctiveness of P. spelaea from P. leo. Some authors consider P. fossilis a subspecies of Panthera spelaea (Panthera spelaea fossilis) while others treat it as a distinct species. Some employ a subgenus of Panthera, "Leo", to contain several lion-like members of Panthera, including P. leo, P. spelaea, P. atrox and P. fossilis. A 2022 study concluded that P. fossilis and P. spelaea represented a chronospecies lineage, with most differences between the two species explainable by size differences.

=== Evolution ===
The lion lineage is thought to have originated in Africa, with fossils of the lineage on the continent extending back to the Late Pliocene, with the ancestors of Panthera fossilis migrating out of Africa during the Early-Middle Pleistocene transition around 0.8 - 1 million years ago, with amongst the earliest confirmed lion fossils outside of Africa being from El-Kowm, Syria, dating to approximately 1 million years ago.

The earliest confirmed records of Panthera fossilis in Europe are from Kozi Grzbiet in Poland, which dates to around 750-700,000 years ago, with records of equivalent age also known from Pakefield, England in sediments of the Cromer Forest Bed. The earliest confirmed records in Southern Europe are from the Notarchirico site in Italy, dating to ~660–612,000 years ago. Possible earlier European records are known from the Vallparadís locality in Spain, suggested to date to around 1 million years ago.^{including supplemental material} Remains of Panthera fossilis in Western Siberia are suggested to date to the late Early Pleistocene, around 1 million years ago.

The estimated time the split between the cave lion and modern lion lineages has been estimated at 500,000 to 1 million years ago, with only small limited amounts of interbreeding since their divergence.

The arrival of Panthera (spelaea) fossilis in Europe was part of a faunal turnover event around the Early-Middle Pleistocene transition in which many of the species that characterised the preceding late Villafranchian became extinct. In the carnivore guild, this notably included the giant hyena Pachycrocuta and the sabertooth cat Megantereon. Following the arrival of Panthera (spelaea) fossilis, the lion-sized sabertooth cat Homotherium and the "European jaguar" Panthera gombaszogensis became much rarer, ultimately becoming extinct in the late Middle Pleistocene, with competition with lions suggested to be a likely important factor. The arrival of Panthera fossilis into Europe was also accompanied by that of the cave hyena (close relatives of the modern spotted hyena), as well as leopards. Between 300,000 and 100,000 years ago, Panthera fossilis evolved into the cave lion (Panthera spelaea), marked by a reduction in body size and a number of changes to its skeletal anatomy (with intermediates between the two dubbed Panthera spelaea intermedia).

== Description ==
Size comparison of the largest individuals of Panthera fossilis as well as its descendant Panthera spelaea with humans

Remains of P. fossilis indicate that it was larger than the modern lion and was among the largest known cats ever, with the largest specimens suggested to have a body length of 2.5–2.9 metres (8.2–9.5 ft), shoulder height of 1.4–1.5 metres (4.6–4.9 ft) and body mass of 400–500 kilograms (880–1,100 lb). Skeletal remains of P. fossilis populations in Siberia measure larger than those in Central Europe. Compared to its descendant Panthera spelaea. P. fossilis had a slightly wider muzzle and nasal region of the skull, though the postorbital and mastoid are narrower, the orbits (eye sockets) are smaller, the bullae are less inflated, the canine teeth are more narrow and less flattened, the incisors are smaller, the upper second premolar and upper fourth premolar are narrower, the upper and lower third premolar and lower fourth premolars have smaller cusps. Another notable difference is that the front part of the upper skull surface (the frontal-nasal region) is typically concave, while this is less frequent in Panthera spelaea. The differences between the skulls of P. fossilis and P. spelaea have been described as relatively subtle.

In comparison to the modern lion, in addition to being larger, the upper second premolar of P. fossilis is larger, and the cusp morphology of the upper fourth premolar is different (having a shorter metastyle).

== Ecology ==
During the Middle Pleistocene, Panthera fossilis was the dominant apex predator in European ecosystems, likely able to displace every other contemporaneous predator species from kills/carcasses.

Herbivores that coexisted with the lion included the hippopotamus, rhinoceroses of the genus Stephanorhinus such as Merck's rhinoceros and the narrow-nosed rhinoceros, straight-tusked elephant, moose, steppe bison, red deer, roe deer and fallow deer. Sympatric predators included brown bears, wolves, cave hyenas, the large sabertooth cat Homotherium, European leopards, and the "European jaguar" Panthera gombaszogensis.

== Relationship with humans ==
The only evidence of human interaction with Panthera fossilis is from Gran Dolina, Spain, dating to Marine Isotope Stage 9 (~300,000 years ago), where a specimen of Panthera fossilis displays cut marks thought to be produced by archaic humans (probably the Sima de los Huesos hominins), who are suggested to have butchered the animal for its flesh.

== See also ==
- History of lions in Europe
- Panthera leo sinhaleyus
- Panthera pardus spelaea
