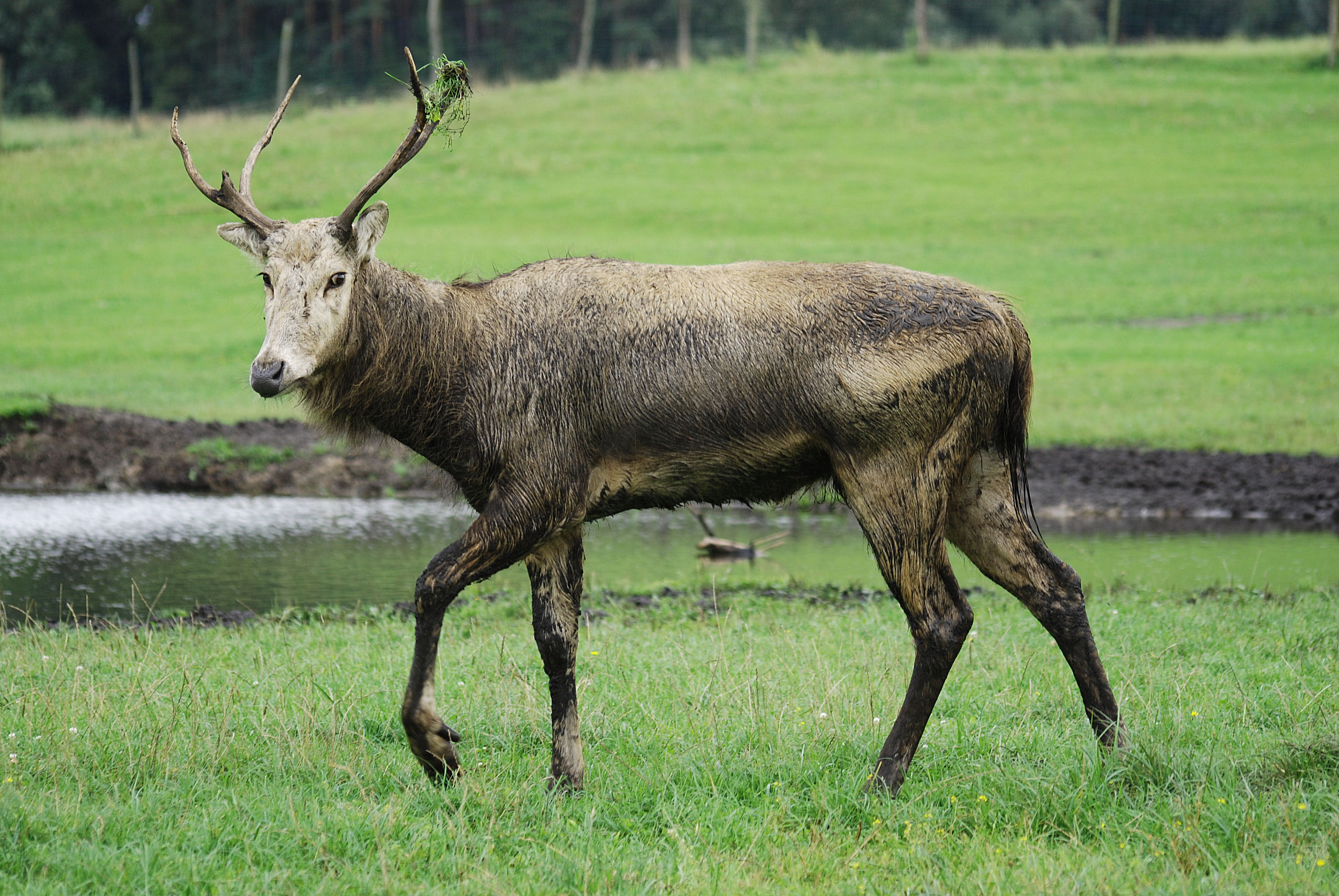
- Père David's deer (Elaphurus davidianus)
- Chital (Axis axis)

Scientific classification
- Kingdom: Animalia
- Phylum: Chordata
- Class: Mammalia
- Order: Artiodactyla
- Family: Cervidae
- Subfamily: Cervinae; Goldfuss, 1820

Tribes
- Muntiacini; Elaphodus; Muntiacus; Cervini; Dama; Axis; Rucervus; Elaphurus; Rusa; Cervus; For extinct genera, see text

= Cervinae =

Cervinae Temporal range: Late Miocene to recent ~11.63–0 Ma

Subfamily of deer

The Cervinae or the Old World deer, are a subfamily of deer. Alternatively, they are known as the plesiometacarpal deer, due to having lost the parts of the second and fifth metacarpal bones closest to the foot (though retaining the parts away from the foot), distinct from the telemetacarpal deer of the Capreolinae (which have instead retained these parts of those metacarpals, while losing the parts away from the foot instead).

== Classification and species ==
The following species are recognised in extant genera:

- Tribe Muntiacini
  - Genus Elaphodus
    - Tufted deer (E. cephalophus)
  - Genus Muntiacus
    - Bornean yellow muntjac (M. atherodes)
    - Hairy-fronted muntjac (M. crinifrons)
    - Fea's muntjac (M. feae)
    - Gongshan muntjac (M. gongshanensis)
    - Malabar red muntjak (M. malabaricus)
    - Northern red muntjac (M. vaginalis)
    - Southern red muntjac (M. muntjak)
    - Sumatran muntjac (M. montanum)
    - Pu Hoat muntjac (M. puhoatensis)
    - Leaf muntjac (M. putaoensis)
    - Reeves's muntjac (M. reevesi)
    - Roosevelt's muntjac (M. rooseveltorum)
    - Truong Son muntjac or Annamite muntjac (M. truongsonensis)
    - Giant muntjac (M. vuquangensis)
- Tribe Cervini ("true" deer)
  - Genus Dama
    - Common fallow deer (D. dama)
    - Persian fallow deer (D. mesopotamica)
  - Genus Axis
    - Chital (A. axis)
    - Calamian deer (A. calamianensis)
    - Bawean deer (A. kuhlii)
    - Indian hog deer (A. porcinus)
  - Genus Rucervus
    - Barasingha (R. duvaucelii)
    - Eld's deer (R. eldii)
    - †Schomburgk's deer (R. schomburgki)
  - Genus Elaphurus
    - Père David's deer (E. davidianus)
  - Genus Rusa
    - Visayan spotted deer or Prince Alfred's deer (R. alfredi)
    - Philippine deer or Philippine sambar (R. mariannus)
    - Javan rusa deer (R. timorensis)
    - Sambar (R. unicolor)
  - Genus Cervus
    - Thorold's deer (C. albirostris)
    - Elk or American wapiti (C. canadensis)
    - Red deer (C. elaphus)
    - Central Asian red deer (C. hanglu)
    - Sika deer (C. nippon)

The taxonomy of Cervini is poorly resolved due to conflict between nuclear DNA and mitochondrial DNA phylogenies:

Mitchondrial DNA phylogeny after Heckeberg (2020) and Xiao et al. 2023

- Cervidae
  - Capreolinae
  - Cervinae
    - Muntiacini
      - Elaphodus (tufted deer)
      - Muntiacus (muntjacs)
    - Cervini
      - - Rucervus (Schomburgk's deer and barasingha)
        - Axis (chital, hog deer)
      - - - Dama (Fallow deer)
          - †Megaloceros giganteus (Irish elk) + †Sinomegaceros
        - - - Elaphurus (Père David's deer)
            - Panolia/Rucervus eldii (Eld's deer)
          - - - Rusa alfredi (Visayan spotted deer)
              - Rusa marianna (Philippine deer)
            - - - Rusa timorensis (Javan rusa)
                - Rusa unicolor (Sambar deer)
              - Cervus (red deer, elk, sika deer)

Nuclear DNA phylogeny after Heckeberg (2020)

- Cervidae
  - Capreolinae
  - Cervinae
    - Muntiacini
      - Elaphodus (tufted deer)
      - Muntiacus (muntjacs)
    - Cervini
      - Dama (Fallow deer)
      - - - Elaphurus (Père David's deer)
          - - Cervus elaphus (red deer)
            - Cervus nippon (sika deer)
        - Cervus albirostris (Thorold's deer)
        - - Rusa unicolor (Sambar deer)
          - - Rusa timorensis (Javan rusa)
            - Panolia/Rucervus eldii (Eld's deer)
            - Rucervus duvaucelii (barasingha)
            - Axis (chital, hog deer)

=== Extinct genera ===
- †Amphiprox
- †Cervavitus? (Eurasia, Late Miocene-Early Pleistocene)
- †Croizetoceros?
- †Dicrocerus
- †Euprox
- †Praesinomegaceros
- †Heteroprox
- †Metacervocerus
- †Praeelaphus
- †Megaloceros (Eurasia, Early/Middle Pleistocene-Holocene, ~5700 BC)
- †Praemegaceros (Europe, Early Pleistocene-Holocene, ~5500 BC)
- †Pseudodama (Eurasia, Early Pleistocene)
- †Sinomegaceros (Central and East Asia, Early-Late Pleistocene)
- †Megaceroides (North Africa, Late Pleistocene-Holocene, ~ 4000 BC)
- †Eucladoceros (Eurasia, Late Pliocene-Early Pleistocene)
- †Candiacervus (Crete, Late Pleistocene)
- †Haploidoceros (Europe, Middle-Late Pleistocene)
- †Xenocervulus (Europe, Early Pliocene)

== Evolution ==
Cervinae is suggested to have split from Capreolinae at least 13.8 million years ago based on the first appearance of Euprox, suggested to be a stem-group cervine in Europe at this time. Modern Cervinae first appeared during the Late Miocene in Eastern Asia, arriving in the Indian subcontinent and Europe during the Early Pilocene. The ancestor of Cervinae probably had a bifurcated antlers similar to muntjacs, with the complex antlers of Cervini evolving independently from those of Capreolinae. Cervinae radiated during the Early Pleistocene, becoming the dominant group of deer across Eurasia.
