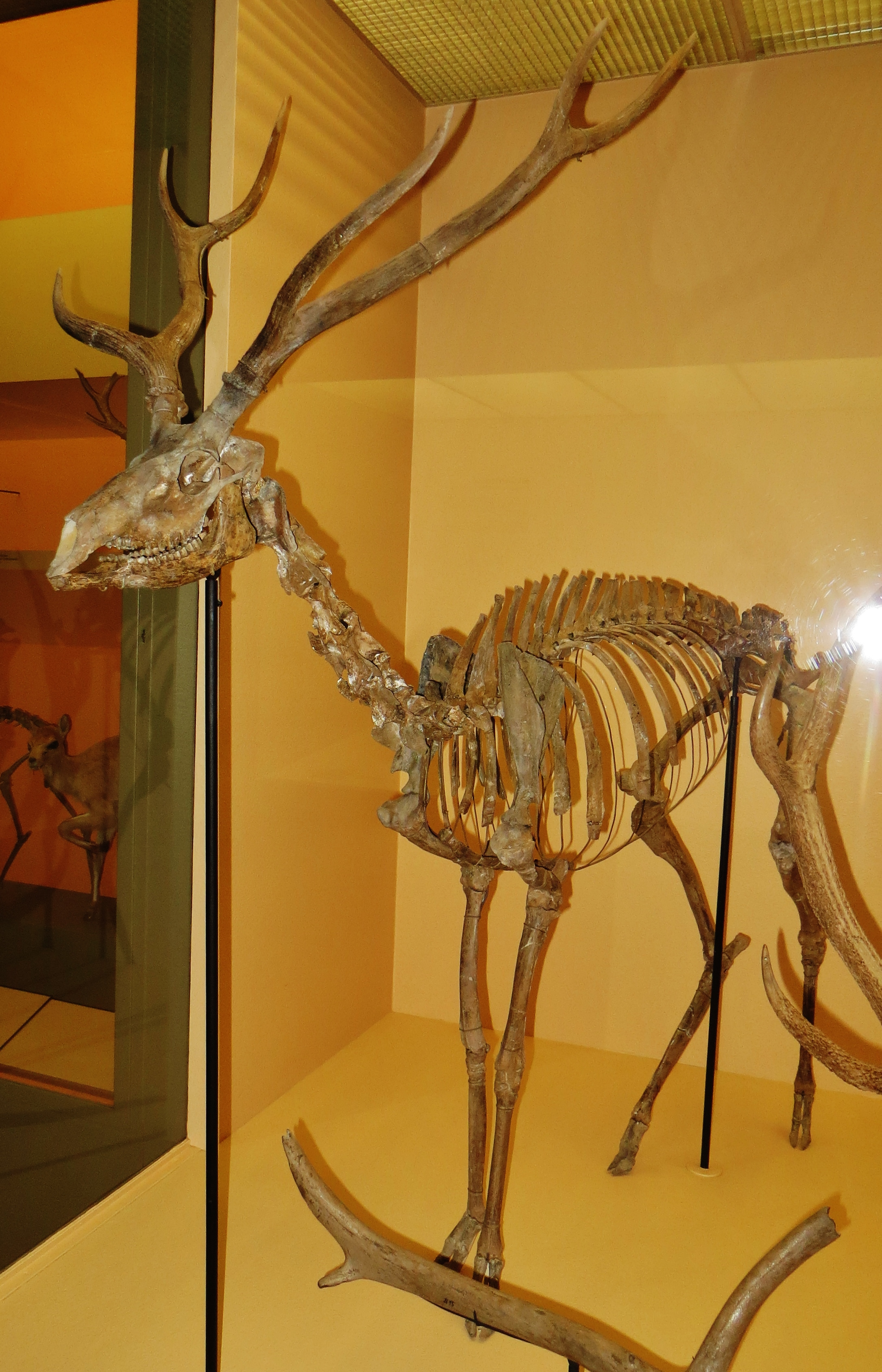
- Skeleton of Metacervoceros rheanus philisi

Scientific classification
- Kingdom: Animalia
- Phylum: Chordata
- Class: Mammalia
- Infraclass: Placentalia
- Order: Artiodactyla
- Family: Cervidae
- Genus: †Metacervocerus; Dietrich, 1938

Species
- †Metacervocerus pardinensis Croizet and Jobert, 1828; †Metacervocerus philisi (Schaub, 1941); †Metacervocerus punjabiensis Brown, 1926; †Metacervocerus rhenanus Dubois, 1904; †Metacervocerus shansius Teilhard de Chardin and Trassaert, 1937

Synonyms
- Pseudodama Azzaroli, 1992

= Metacervocerus =

Metacervocerus Temporal range: Pliocene–Pleistocene

Extinct genus of cervid

Metacervocerus (also spelled Metacervoceros) is an extinct genus of deer that lived in Eurasia during the Pliocene and Pleistocene epochs.

== Taxonomy ==
The genus was originally named as a subgenus of Cervus. The type species of the genus is Metacervocerus pardinensis. Metacervocerus philisi is generally regarded as a synonym or subspecies of Metacervocerus rheanus. Metacervocerus is considered to be a member of the subfamily Cervinae, and has been posited to either be closely related to fallow deer (genus Dama) or to the genus Axis, which contains the Indian chital, among others.

== Description ==
The type species, Metacervocerus pardinensis is only known from antlers and teeth, while Metacervocerus rhenanus is known from better material including skulls. Metacervocerus pardinensis has been estimated to have had a body mass of approximately 60 kilograms (130 lb), while Metacervocerus philisi/rheanus has been considered comparable in size to small fallow deer. The antlers of Metacervocerus are three-pointed.

== Distribution ==
Metacervocerus pardinensis is known from Europe, including France, Britain (Red Crag), Moldova, Bulgaria, Romania, Poland and Slovakia. Metacervocerus philisi/rheanus is known from remains spanning across Europe, from Spain and France in the West to Greece and Romania in the east, but noticeably absent from the Italian peninsula. M. shansius inhabited China. M. punjabiensis hails from the Sivalik Hills of the Indian Subcontinent.

== Chronology ==
Metacervocerus pardinensis is exclusively known from the Pliocene. Metacervocerus philisi is known from remains spanning from the earliest Pleistocene 2.5 million years ago, until near the end of the Early Pleistocene around 900,000 years ago.

== Ecology ==
Dental microwear analysis as well as the shape of its skull, suggests that Metacervocerus rheanus had a browsing based diet on leaves. Metacervocerus rheanus coexisted alongside other deer species in Early Pleistocene Europe, including Croizetoceros ramosus and Eucladoceros ctenoides. Isotopic analysis of the ecosystem of Venta Micena in southern Spain, dating to the Early Pleistocene, suggests that at this locality Metacervocerus rhenanus was a key prey species of the "European jaguar" Panthera gombaszogensis.
