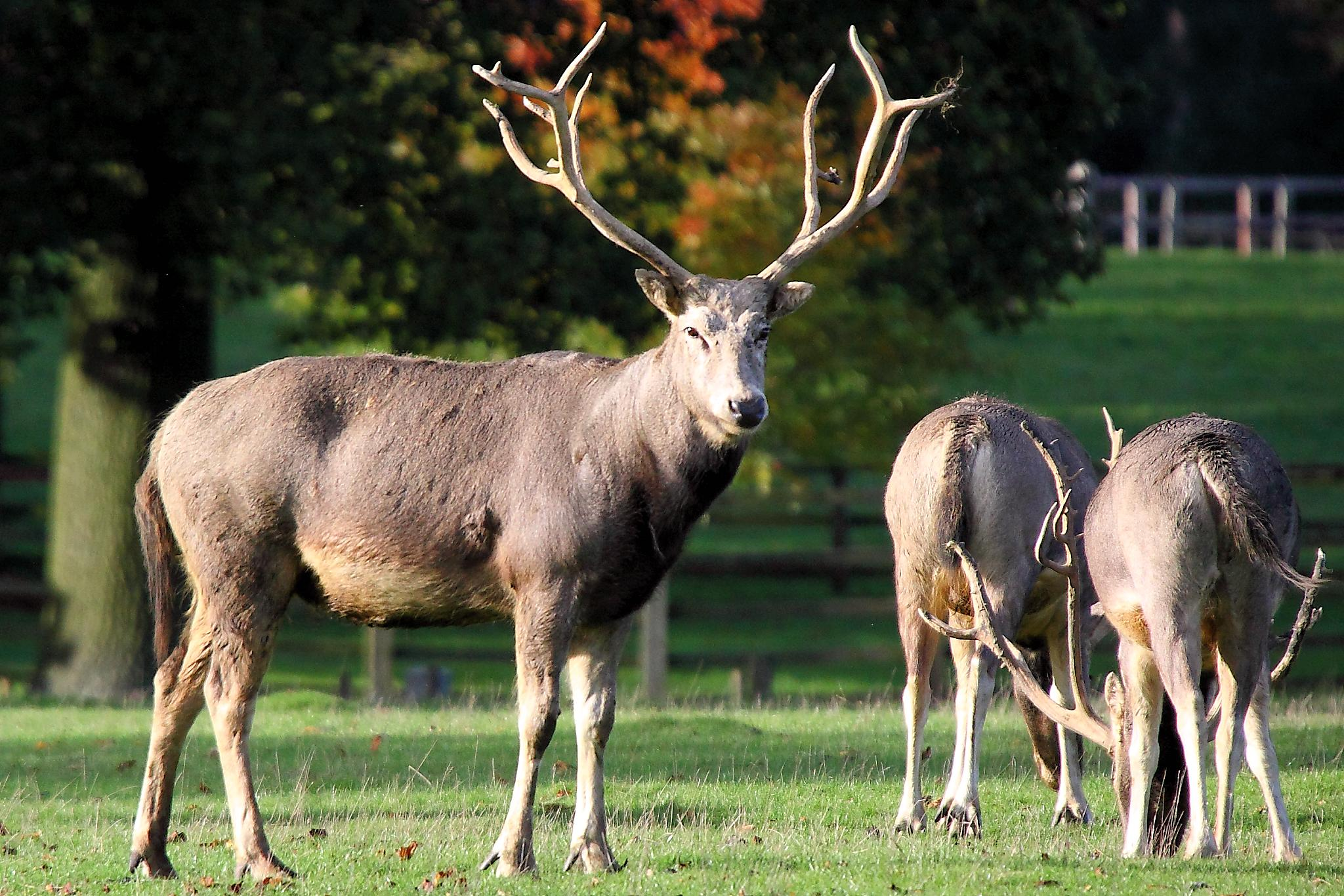
- Elaphurus davidianus

Scientific classification
- Domain: Eukaryota
- Kingdom: Animalia
- Phylum: Chordata
- Class: Mammalia
- Order: Artiodactyla
- Family: Cervidae
- Tribe: Cervini
- Genus: Elaphurus; A. Milne-Edwards, 1866

Type species
- Elaphurus davidianus A. Milne-Edwards, 1866

= Elaphurus =

Genus of deer

Elaphurus is a genus of deer. E. davidianus is the only extant species and several fossil species are described.

== Species ==
As of 2019, the following living and fossil species were recognised:

- Elaphurus Milne-Edwards, 1866.
  - Elaphurus davidianus Milne-Edwards, 1866; Père David's deer
  - †Elaphurus bifurcates Teilhard de Chardin et Piveteau, 1930.
    - †Elaphurus bifurcatus shikamai Otsuka, 1968
  - †Elaphurus eleonorae Vislobokova, 1988.
  - †Elaphurus chinnaniensis Chia et Wang, 1978.
  - †Elaphurus formosanus Shikama, 1937.
