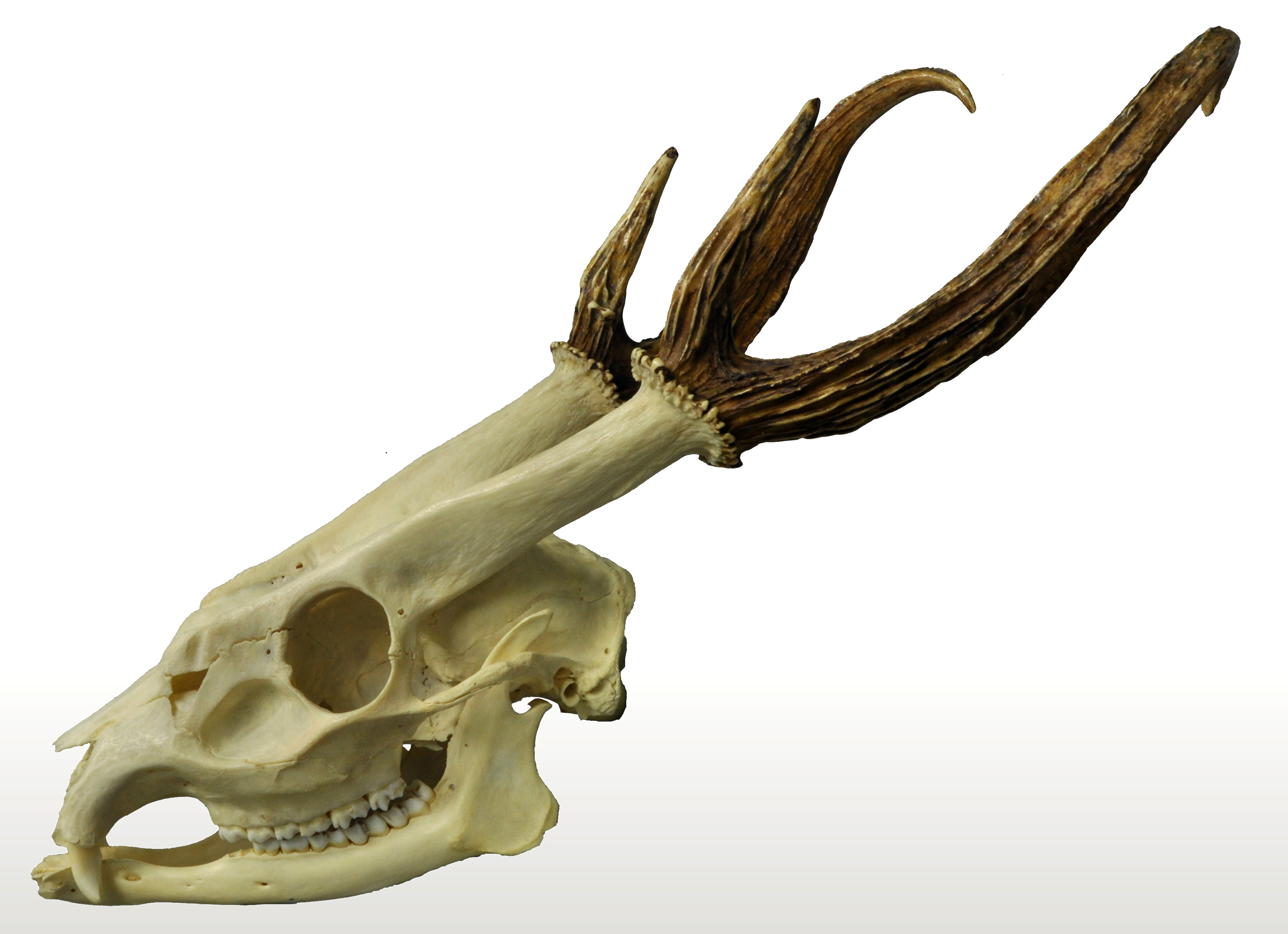
- Skull

Conservation status
- Critically Endangered (IUCN 3.1)
- CITES Appendix I

Scientific classification
- Kingdom: Animalia
- Phylum: Chordata
- Class: Mammalia
- Order: Artiodactyla
- Family: Cervidae
- Genus: Muntiacus
- Species: M. vuquangensis

Binomial name
- Muntiacus vuquangensis (Tuoc, Dung, Dawson, Arctander and Mackinnon, 1994)
- Geographic range

Synonyms
- Megamuntiacus vuquangensis (Tuoc et al., 1994)

= Giant muntjac =

Species of deer

The giant muntjac (Muntiacus vuquangensis), sometimes referred to as the large-antlered muntjac, is a species of muntjac deer. It is the largest muntjac species and was discovered in 1994 in Vũ Quang, Hà Tĩnh Province of Vietnam and in central Laos. During inundation of the Nakai Reservoir in Khammouane Province of Laos for the Nam Theun 2 Multi-Purpose Project, 38 giant muntjac were captured, studied, and released into the adjacent Nakai-Nam Theun National Protected Area. Subsequent radio-tracking of a sample of these animals showed the relocation was successful. The species is also located in parts of eastern Cambodia, as well as the Annamite Mountains (Trường Sơn Mountains).

The giant muntjac is commonly found in evergreen forests and weighs about 66–110 lb (30–50 kg). It has a red-brown coat and is an even-toed ungulate. Due to slash-and-burn agriculture, combined with hunting, the giant muntjac is considered critically endangered. It is preyed upon by animals such as the tiger and leopard. It is most closely related to Muntiacus muntjak (common muntjac).
