= Xenocervulus =

Xenocervulus Temporal range: Zanclean

Scientific classification
- Kingdom: Animalia
- Phylum: Chordata
- Class: Mammalia
- Order: Artiodactyla
- Family: Cervidae
- Genus: †Xenocervulus; Croitor, 2025
- Species: †X. ruscinensis

Binomial name
- †Xenocervulus ruscinensis (Depéret, 1890)

Extinct genus of artiodactyl

Xenocervulus is an extinct genus of cervine deer that lived in Europe during the Zanclean stage of the Pliocene epoch.

== Palaeobiology ==
=== Palaeoecology ===
The brachydont, small cheek teeth in the maxilla suggest that X. ruscinensis was a folivorous browser.
