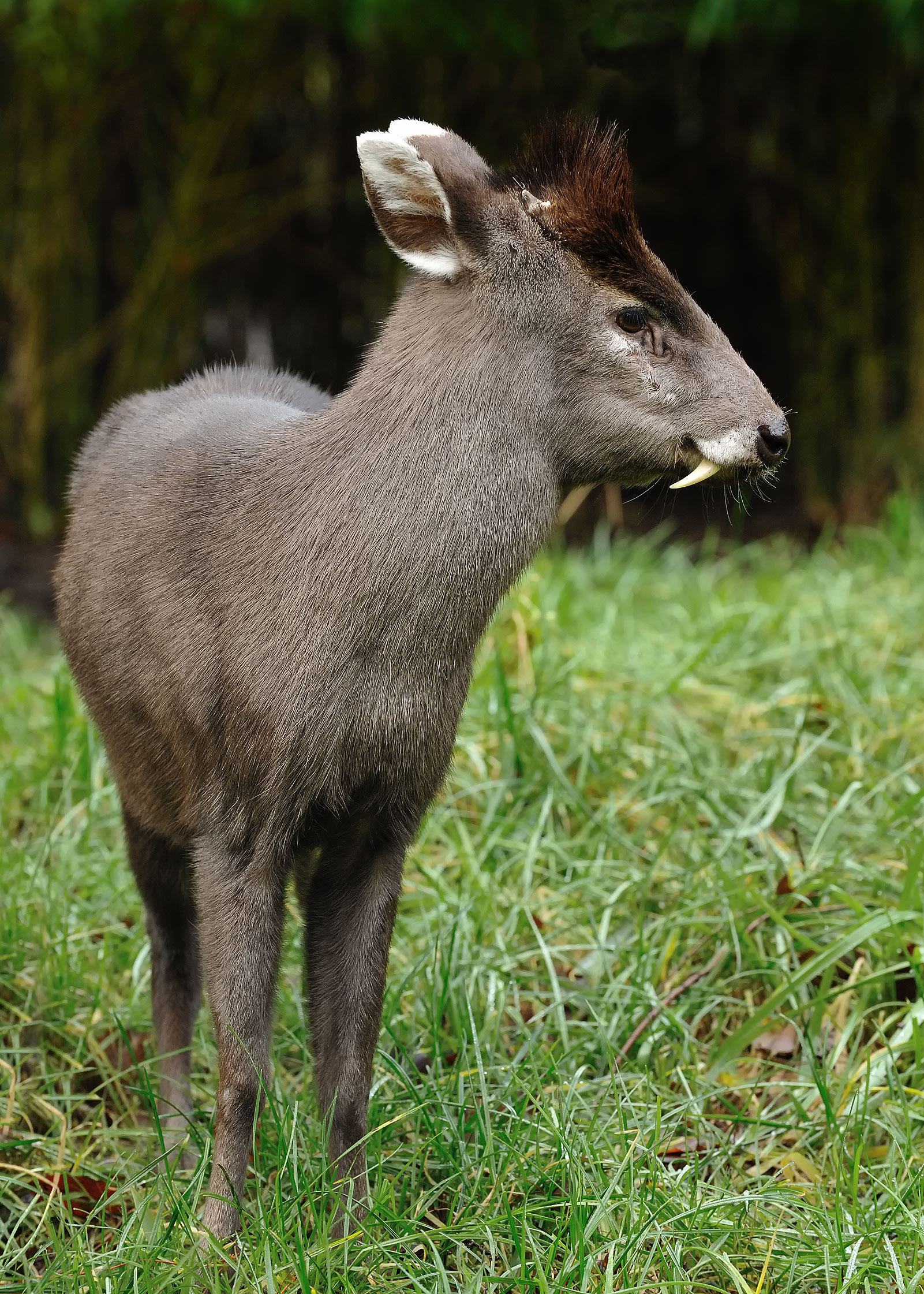
- Male
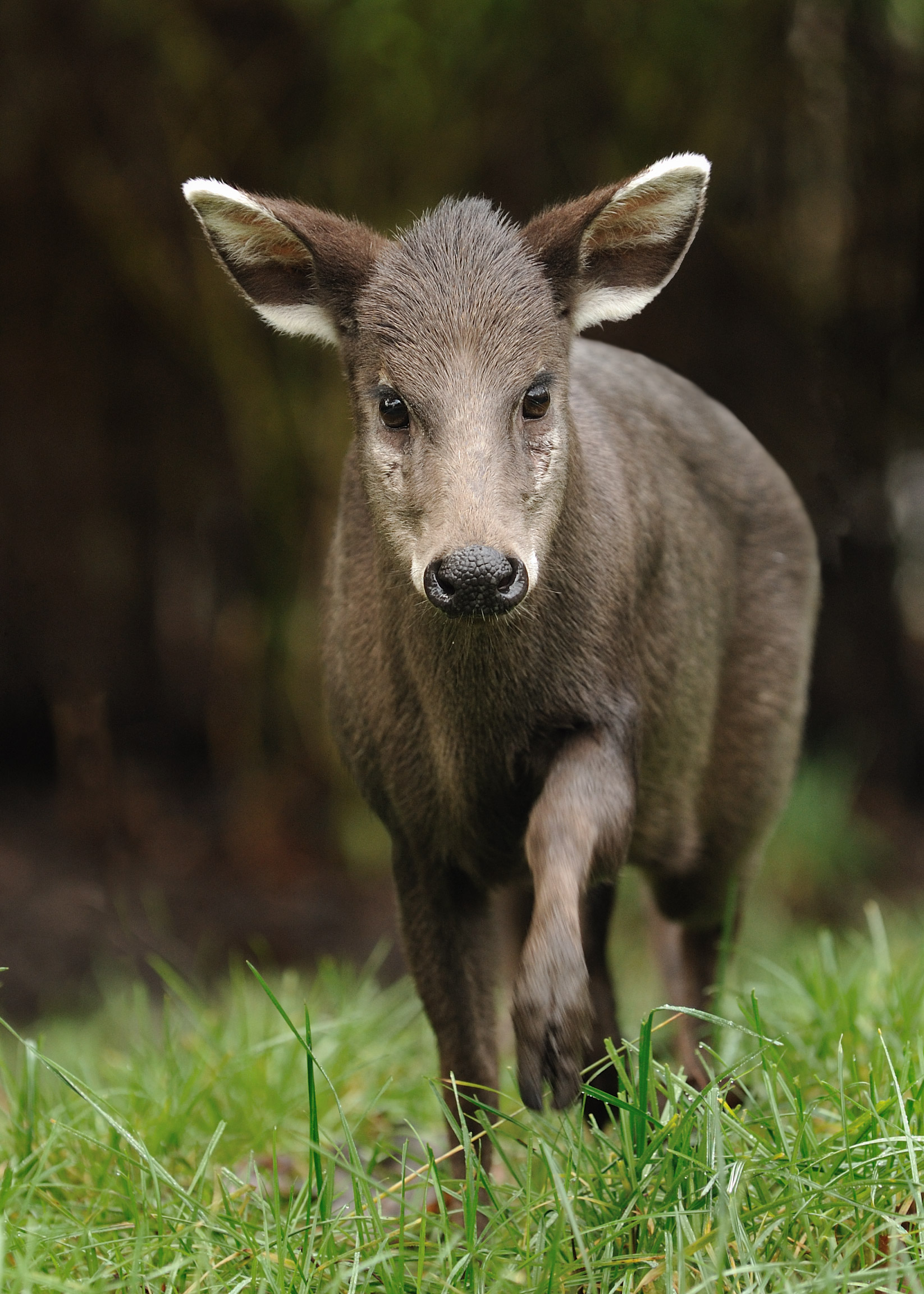
- Female

Conservation status
- Near Threatened (IUCN 3.1)

Scientific classification
- Kingdom: Animalia
- Phylum: Chordata
- Class: Mammalia
- Order: Artiodactyla
- Family: Cervidae
- Genus: Elaphodus; Milne-Edwards, 1872
- Species: E. cephalophus

Binomial name
- Elaphodus cephalophus Milne-Edwards, 1872

= Tufted deer =

Species of mammals

The tufted deer (Elaphodus cephalophus) is a small species of deer characterized by a prominent tuft of black hair on its forehead and fang-like canines for the males. It is a close relative of the muntjac, living somewhat further north over a wide area of central China and northeastern Myanmar. Suffering from overhunting and habitat loss, this deer is considered near-threatened. It is the only member of the genus Elaphodus.

== Subspecies ==
Four subspecies of the tufted deer are recognized, with one having doubtful taxonomic status:

- E. c. cephalophus – the largest subspecies, brownish coat, found in southwestern China and northeastern Myanmar.
- E. c. michianus – has a relatively narrow snout, found in southeastern China.
- E. c. ichangensis – has a relatively broad snout, with a grey-brown coat, found in Central China.
- E. c. forciensus – doubtful subspecies, distribution unclear.

== Description ==
The tufted deer is similar to a muntjac in appearance, but the longer necks and legs give it a slightly leaner appearance. The coat is coarse with short and stiff hairs, being almost black in the winter and chocolate brown in the summer. The lips, tip of the ears, and the underside of the tails are white. A tuft of horseshoe-shaped hair is present on the forehead and upper neck, being brown to black, and can be up to 17 centimetres (6.7 in) long.

Perhaps the most striking feature of this deer is the fang-like canines in the males of the species. These can grow up to 2.6 cm (1.0 in) long, or longer in rare cases.

The tufted deer is a small deer, but still larger than most muntjac species. It stands at 50–70 centimetres (20–28 in) at the shoulder, and the weight varies from 17 to 30 kilograms (37 to 66 lb). The tail is short at around 10 cm (3.9 in). The antler is only present in males and is extremely short, almost hidden by its long tuft of hair.

== Habitat and distribution ==
The tufted deer is found mainly in China, where it occurs in the south from eastern coast to eastern Tibet. It is absent from the extreme south of the country. There are old records of this species in northeastern Myanmar, but recent surveys failed to find any, possibly due to the lack of surveys on the preferred habitat.

Tufted deer are highly distributed animals where it overlaps in its distribution with other species like the Sambar. It inhabits high, damp forests at 500–4,500 metres (1,600–14,800 ft) above sea level, close to the tree line. It is found in both evergreen and deciduous forests with extensive understory and nearby freshwater supply. In places such as the Gongga Mountain National Nature Reserve. In this area, the plants and trees change as you go higher in altitude. This means that the plants at the lower part of the mountain are mostly subtropical, while the ones at higher parts of the mountain are those that can survive cold, harsh conditions such as snow. The tufted deer's preference for montane forests emphasizes its ability to live in regions with different temperature variation. Additionally, the availability of salt licks is also a positive factor to the presence of this animal. This deer is able to withstand minor human disturbances, and is occasionally found in cultivated lands.

== Behavior and reproduction ==
The tufted deer is mainly solitary or found in pairs. It is crepuscular and travels in fixed routes about its territory, which is vigorously defended by the males. It is a timid animal and prefer places with good cover, where it is well camouflaged. It can be easily disturbed and, when alarmed, it will let out a bark before fleeing, moving in cat-like jumps.

The mating season occurs between September and December, during which the loud barks males make could be easily heard. The gestation period lasts about 6 months and a litter of 1–2 is born in late spring and early summer. The young becomes sexually mature at the age of 1–2 years, and could live up to 10–12 years in the wild.

The mating system of the tufted deer is polygynous which can lead to male deer fighting over mates. Male adult tufted deer are also known to fight over territory to show dominance. When fighting their main weapon is their elongated canines, and they also use their antlers but they are not as dangerous.

== Diet ==
Tufted deer are herbivorous species. Their diet mainly consists of leaves, twigs, fruit, and different types of vegetation. Tufted deer are considered both grazers and browsers, meaning they feed on both grass and various other vegetation.

== Threats and conservation ==
Surveys from 1998 put the estimated population around 300,000–500,000 individuals, though a substantial, ongoing decline is almost certain. Overharvesting of large animals in China is a serious threat to not only this species. The hide of this deer is a fairly high-end textile material, especially after the vigorous conservation efforts made on other more endangered species. Habitat loss is also an issue in this rapidly developing country. In China, this species is listed as provincially protected species in many places, but it is not protected by the national law. It occurs in a number of protected areas. More study needs to be done on this poorly known species for efficient protection.

The tufted deer is part of the yellow species survival plan program by the association of zoos and aquariums, because it cannot maintain 90% gene diversity for 10 generations. To prevent gene diversity to continue dropping, the program plans to work on ex situ populations by increasing the number of exhibit places in zoos and making sure that animals can breed. Prior to this the tufted deer population was also decreasing in captivity due to lack of interest in the species, even though captive breeding has greatly helped to conserve this species by facilitating interbreeding and gene diversity.
