= Praesinomegaceros =

Scientific classification
- Domain: Eukaryota
- Kingdom: Animalia
- Phylum: Chordata
- Class: Mammalia
- Order: Artiodactyla
- Family: Cervidae
- Subfamily: Cervinae
- Genus: †Praesinomegaceros

Praesinomegaceros is an extinct genus of deer that lived in Eurasia during the Miocene and Pliocene epochs.

== Distribution ==
The earliest species, P. venustus, lived in Tuva during the Late Miocene. P. bakri inhabited the Indian Subcontinent during the Pliocene. P. asiaticus lived in Mongolia during the Early Pliocene.
