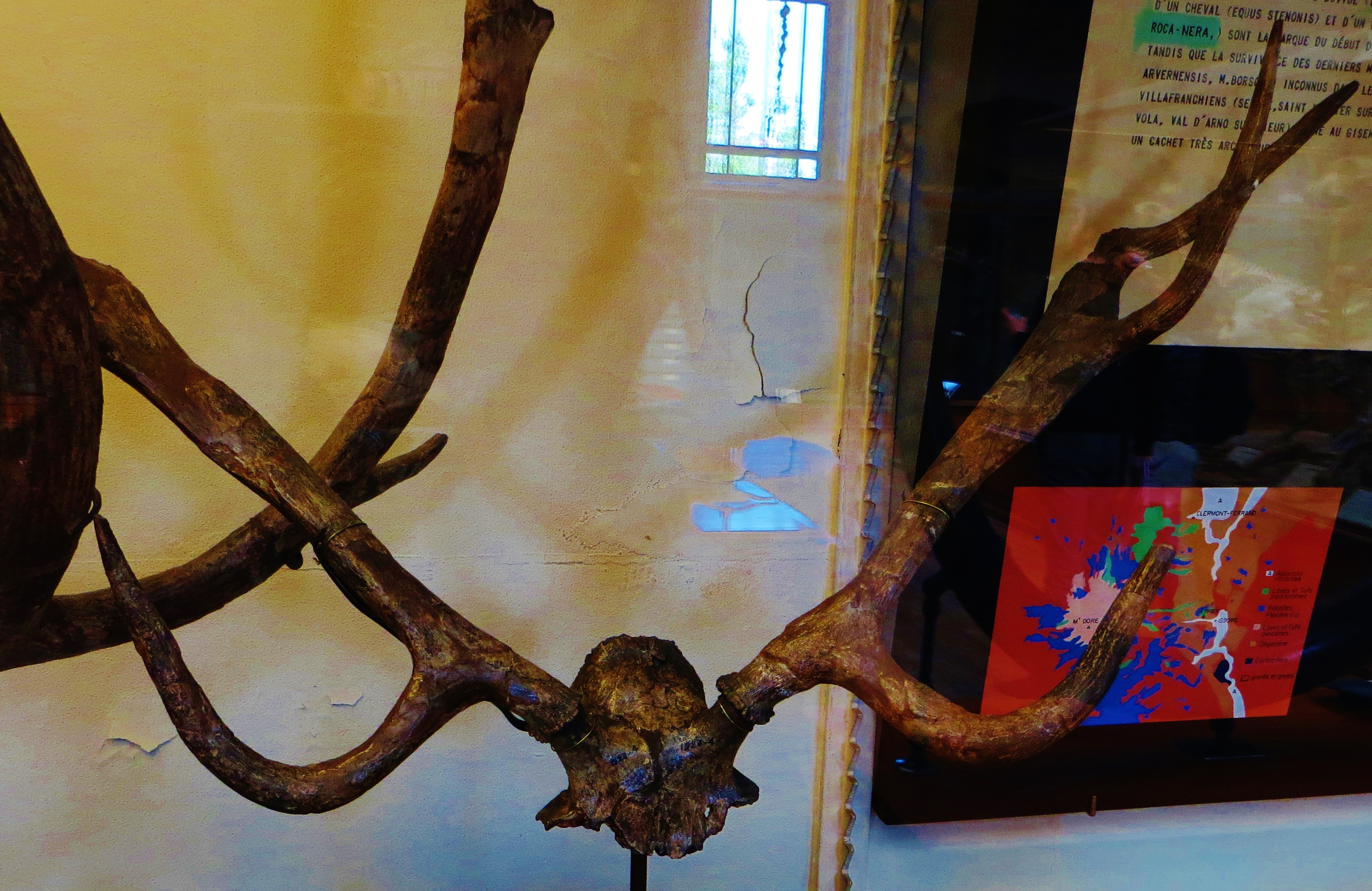
- Skull of Croizetoceros ramosus at the Gallery of Paleontology and Comparative Anatomy, Paris.

Scientific classification
- Kingdom: Animalia
- Phylum: Chordata
- Class: Mammalia
- Order: Artiodactyla
- Family: Cervidae
- Tribe: Cervini
- Genus: †Croizetoceros; Heintz, 1970

Type species
- †Croizetoceros ramosus Croizet & Jobert, 1828 (as Cervus ramosus)

Species
- C. proramosus; C. ramosus

= Croizetoceros =

Croizetoceros Temporal range: 5.5–1.41 Ma Late Miocene - Early Pleistocene

Extinct genus of deer

Croizetoceros is an extinct genus of deer which lived throughout much of Europe, first appearing during the last stages of the Miocene and living until the Early Pleistocene.

== Taxonomy ==
The type species, Croizetoceros ramosus was originally classified as Cervus ramosus, but was found distinct enough to be placed into its own genus. Many subspecies of C. ramosus have been identified throughout Europe, and another species, C. proramosus, has also been described in 1996 from fossil remains found in France.

== Description ==
Croizetoceros was a mid-sized species, similar in size to the living fallow deer. It stood a little over 1 m (3.3 ft) tall and weighed around 60 kg (130 lb). Croizetoceros was one of the first modern-looking deer. It had complex antlers, with four or even five short branches. They were long and lyre-shaped, with the tines branching off tangentially from the central branch.

== Palaeobiology ==
Croizetoceros was probably a browser. Based on its dental mesowear, microwear, and geometric morphometrics from the Gelasian site of Gerakarou-1 in Greece, C. ramosus fed on a diet very similar to that of the modern red deer.
