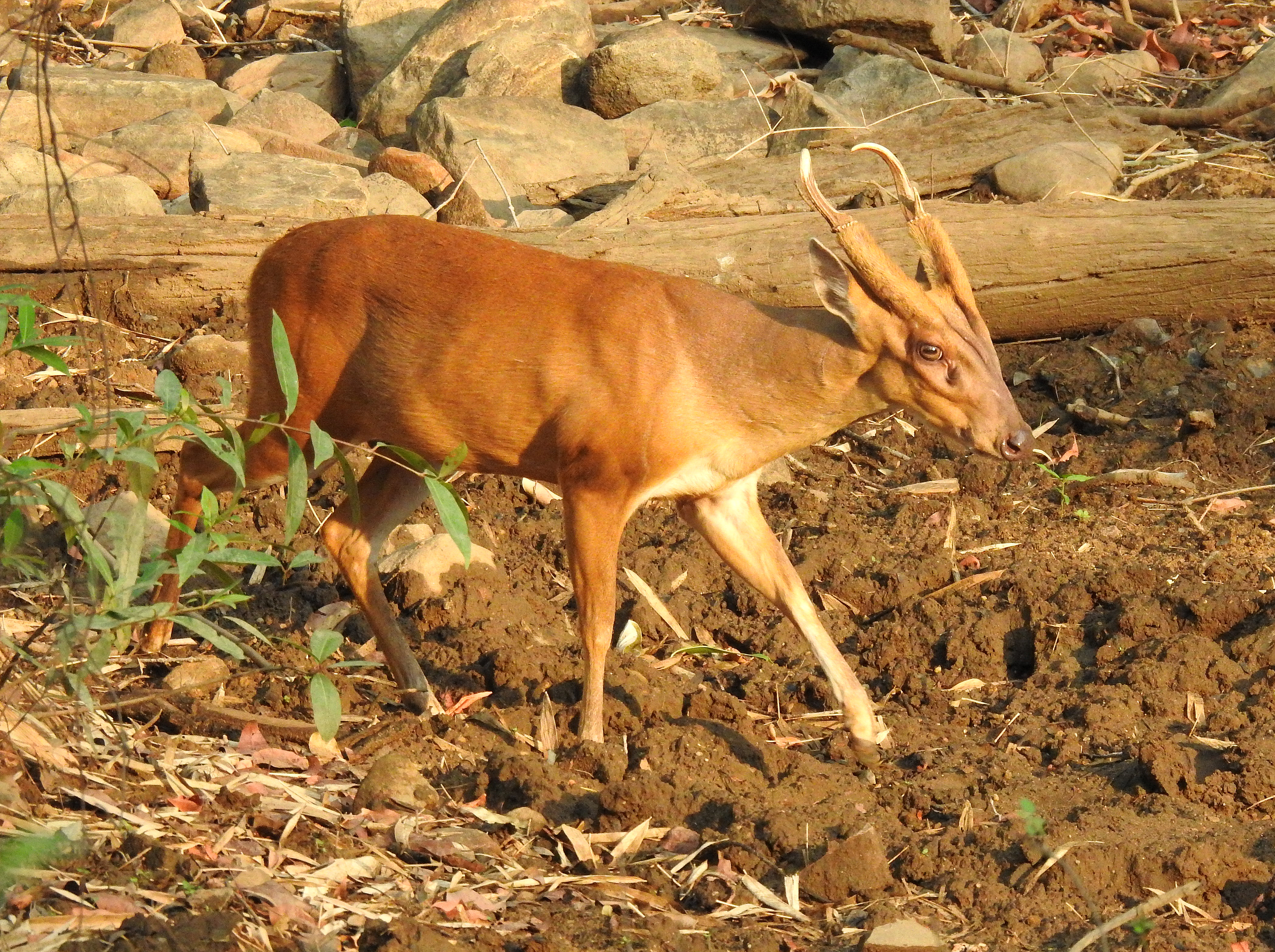
- Male southern red muntjac in Tadoba Andhari Tiger Reserve, India

Scientific classification
- Kingdom: Animalia
- Phylum: Chordata
- Class: Mammalia
- Order: Artiodactyla
- Family: Cervidae
- Tribe: Muntiacini
- Genus: Muntiacus; Rafinesque, 1815

Type species
- Cervus muntjak Zimmerman, 1780
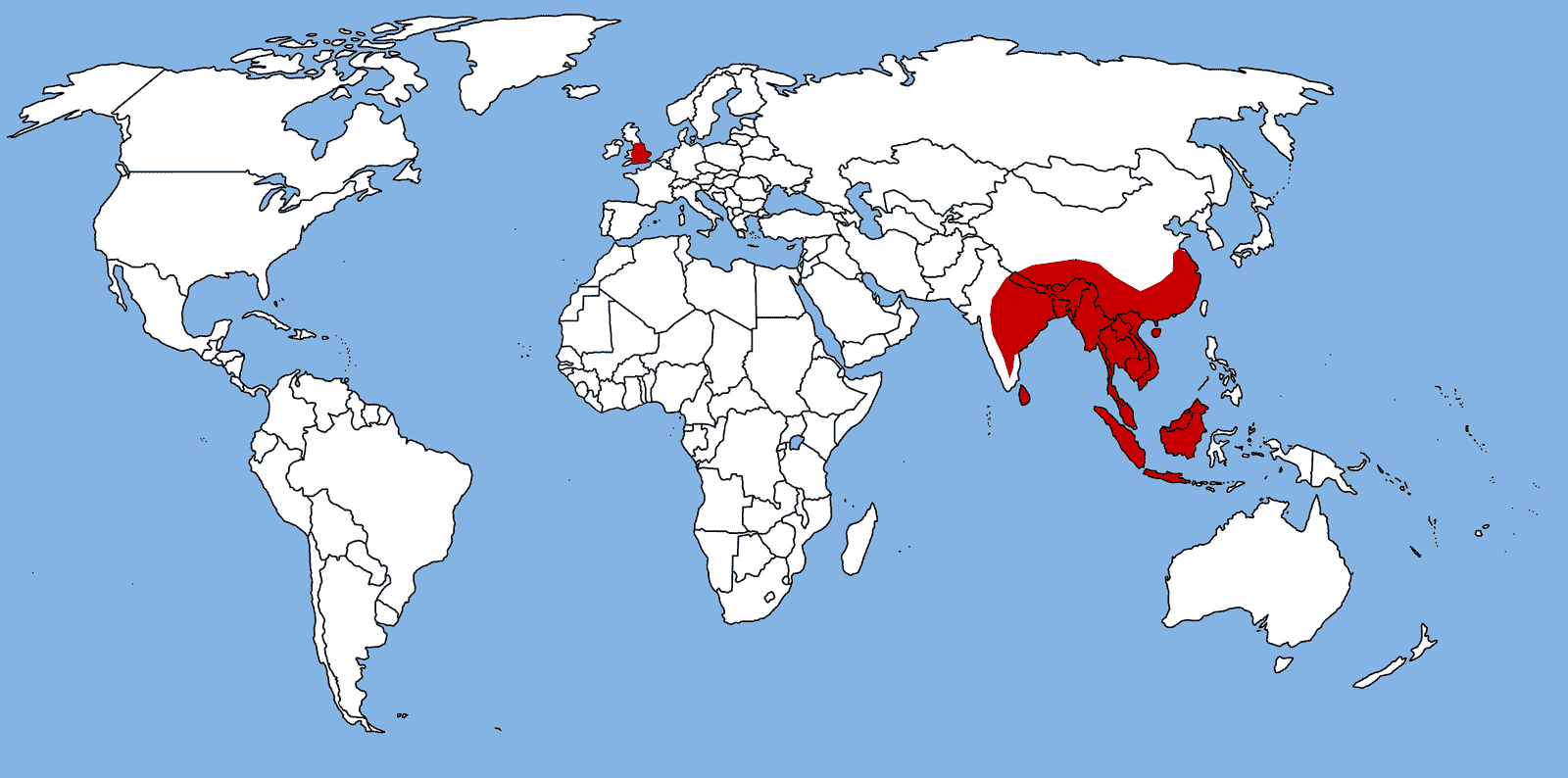
- native (Asia) and exotic (Great Britain) ranges of genus Muntiacus

= Muntjac =

Muntjac Temporal range: Miocene to present

Genus of deer

Muntjacs (/mʌntdʒæk/ MUNT-jak), also known as the barking deer or rib-faced deer, are small deer of the genus Muntiacus native to South Asia and Southeast Asia. Muntjacs are thought to have begun appearing 15–35 million years ago, with remains found in Miocene deposits in France, Germany and Poland. Most are listed as least-concern species or Data Deficient by the International Union for Conservation of Nature (IUCN), although others such as the black muntjac, Bornean yellow muntjac, and giant muntjac are vulnerable, near threatened, and critically endangered, respectively.

== Name ==
Video of a muntjac deer barking.

Muntjac is a borrowing of the Latinized form of the Dutch muntjak, which was borrowed from the Sundanese mencek (pronounced [mənt͡ʃək]). The Latin form first appeared as Cervus muntjac in Zimmerman in 1780. An erroneous alternative name of Mastreani deer has its origins in a mischievous Wikipedia entry from 2011 and is incorrect.

They are also called the barking deer because of their characteristic bark.

== Distribution ==
The present-day species are native to Asia and can be found in Thailand, Bangladesh, Pakistan, India, Sri Lanka, Myanmar, Vietnam, the Indonesian islands, Taiwan and Southern China. Their habitat includes areas of dense vegetation, rainforests, monsoon forests and they like to be close to a water source. They are also found in the lower Himalayas (Terai regions of Nepal and Bhutan).

An invasive population of Reeves's muntjac exists in the United Kingdom and in some areas of Japan. In the United Kingdom, wild muntjac descended from escapees from the Woburn Abbey estate around 1925. Muntjac have expanded rapidly, and are present in most English counties and also in Wales, although they are less common in the north-west. The British Deer Society in 2007 found that muntjac deer had noticeably expanded their range in the UK since 2000. Specimens appeared in Northern Ireland in 2009, and in the Republic of Ireland in 2010.

Inhabiting tropical regions, the deer have no seasonal rut, and mating can take place at any time of year; this behaviour is retained by populations introduced to temperate countries.

== Description ==
=== Tusks ===
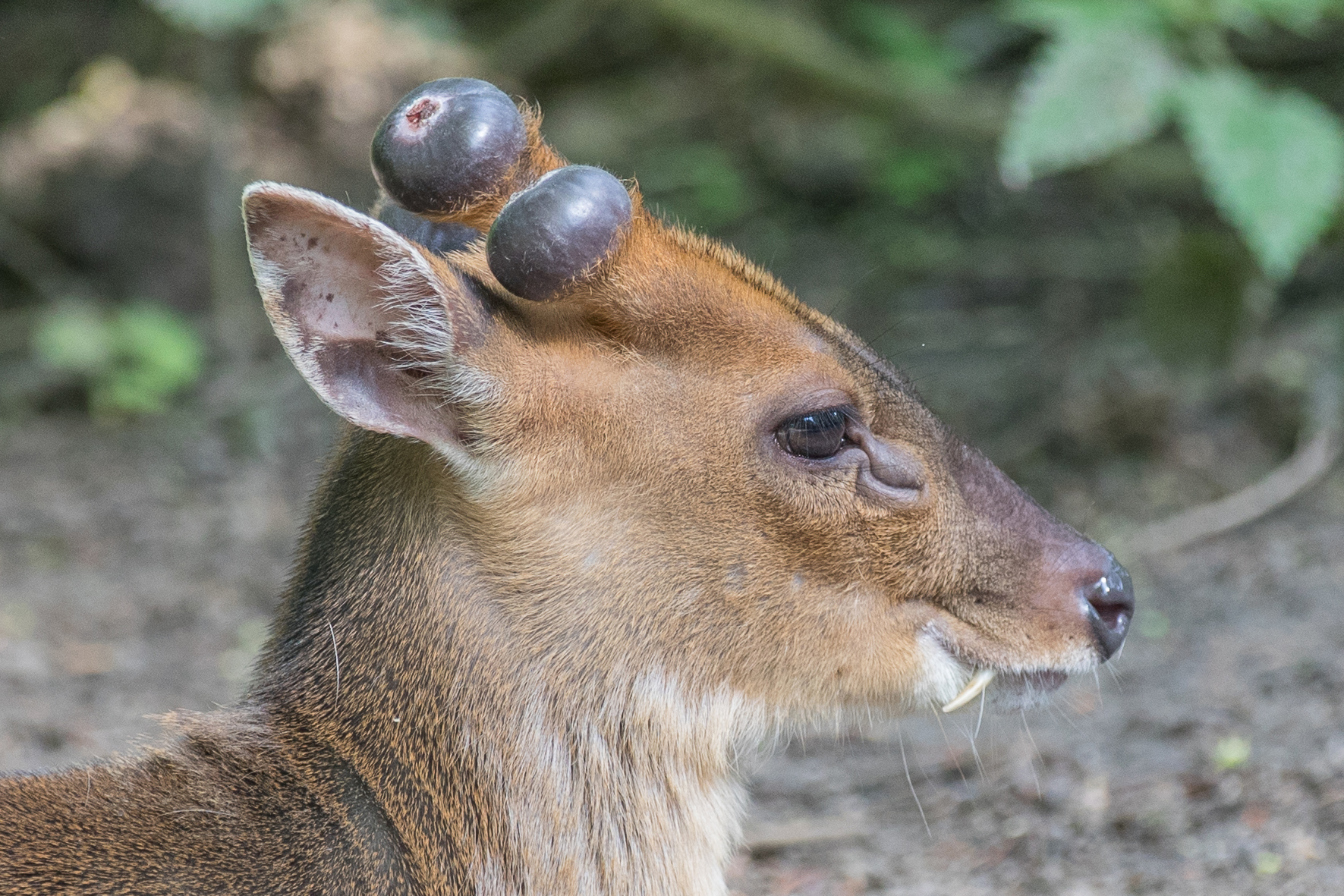
A captive young Chinese muntjac buck with exposed canine tooth

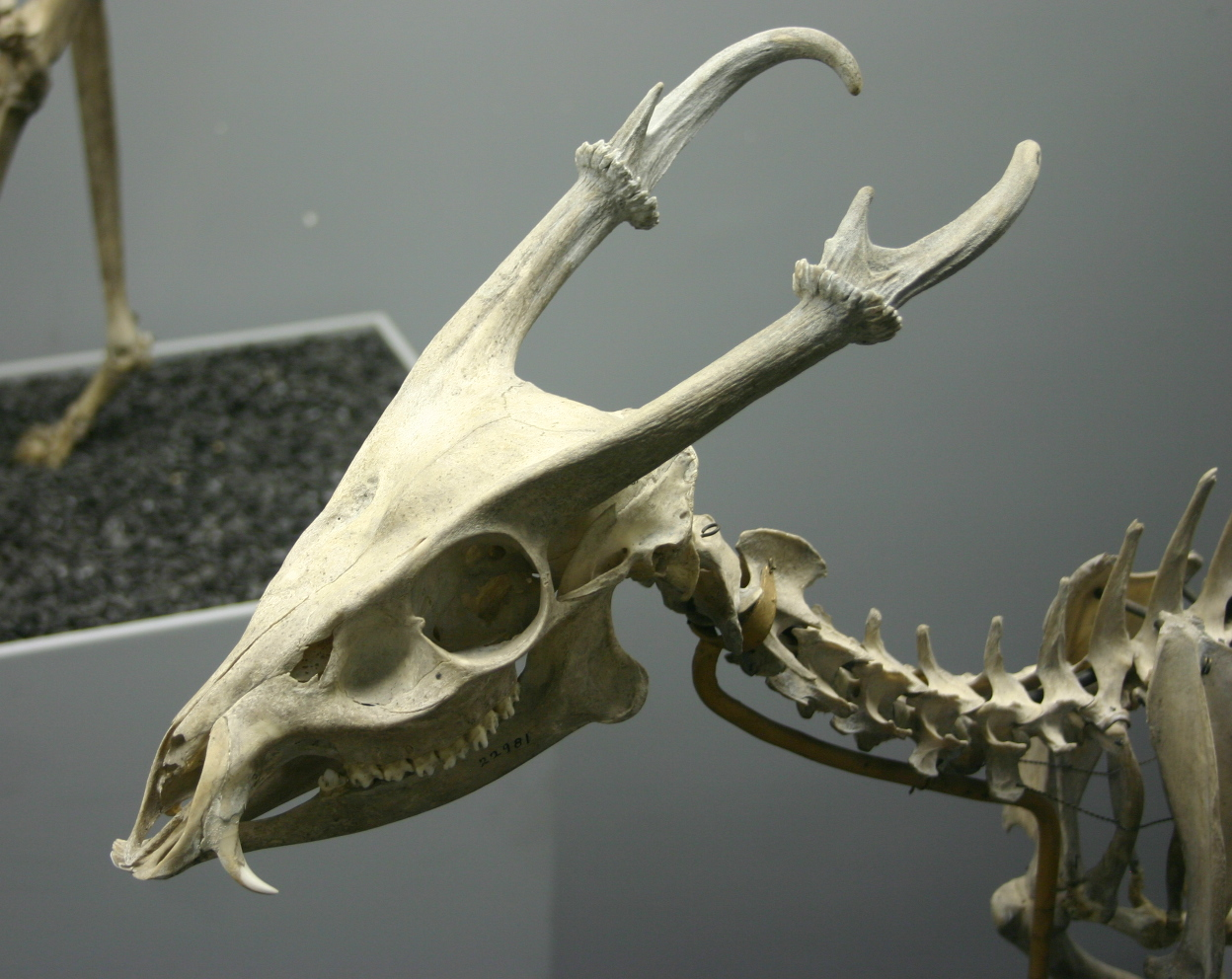
Skull of a buck in advanced maturity, showing canine tooth, slanted pedicles and branched antlers. A distinct coronet, or burr, is visible at the antler-pedicle junction.

Males have short antlers, which can regrow, but they tend to fight for territory with their "tusks" (downward-pointing canine teeth). The presence of these "tusks" is otherwise unknown in native British wild deer and can be an identifying feature to differentiate a muntjac from an immature native deer. Water deer also have visible tusks but they are much less widespread. Although these tusks resemble those of both water deer and the musk deer, the muntjac is not related to either of these (and they are not related to each other). The tusks are of a quite different shape in each.

=== Glands ===
Muntjacs possess various scent glands that have crucial functions in communication and territorial marking. They use their facial glands primarily to mark the ground and occasionally other individuals, and the glands are opened during defecation and urination, as well as sometimes during social displays. While the frontal glands are typically opened involuntarily as a result of facial muscle contractions, the preorbital glands near the eyes can be voluntarily opened much wider and even everted to push out the underlying glandular tissue. Even young fawns are capable of fully everting their preorbital glands.

== Genetics ==
Muntiacus muntjak chromosomes

Muntjac are of great interest in evolutionary studies because of their dramatic chromosome variations and the discovery of several new species. The Southern red muntjac (M. muntjak) is the mammal with the lowest recorded chromosome number: The male has a diploid number of 7, the female only 6 chromosomes. Reeves's muntjac (M. reevesi), in comparison, has a diploid number of 46 chromosomes.

== Species ==
The genus Muntiacus has 14 recognized species:

- Bornean yellow muntjac, Muntiacus atherodes
- Hairy-fronted muntjac or black muntjac, Muntiacus crinifrons
- Fea's muntjac, Muntiacus feae
- Gongshan muntjac, Muntiacus gongshanensis
- Malabar red muntjak, Muntiacus malabaricus
- Sumatran muntjac Muntiacus montanus
- Southern red muntjac, Muntiacus muntjak
- Leaf muntjac Muntiacus putaoensis
- Pu Hoat muntjac Muntiacus puhoatensis
- Reeves's muntjac or Chinese muntjac, Muntiacus reevesi
- Roosevelt's muntjac, Muntiacus rooseveltorum
- Truong Son muntjac Muntiacus truongsonensis
- Northern red muntjac, Muntiacus vaginalis
- Giant muntjac, Muntiacus vuquangensis

== Gallery ==
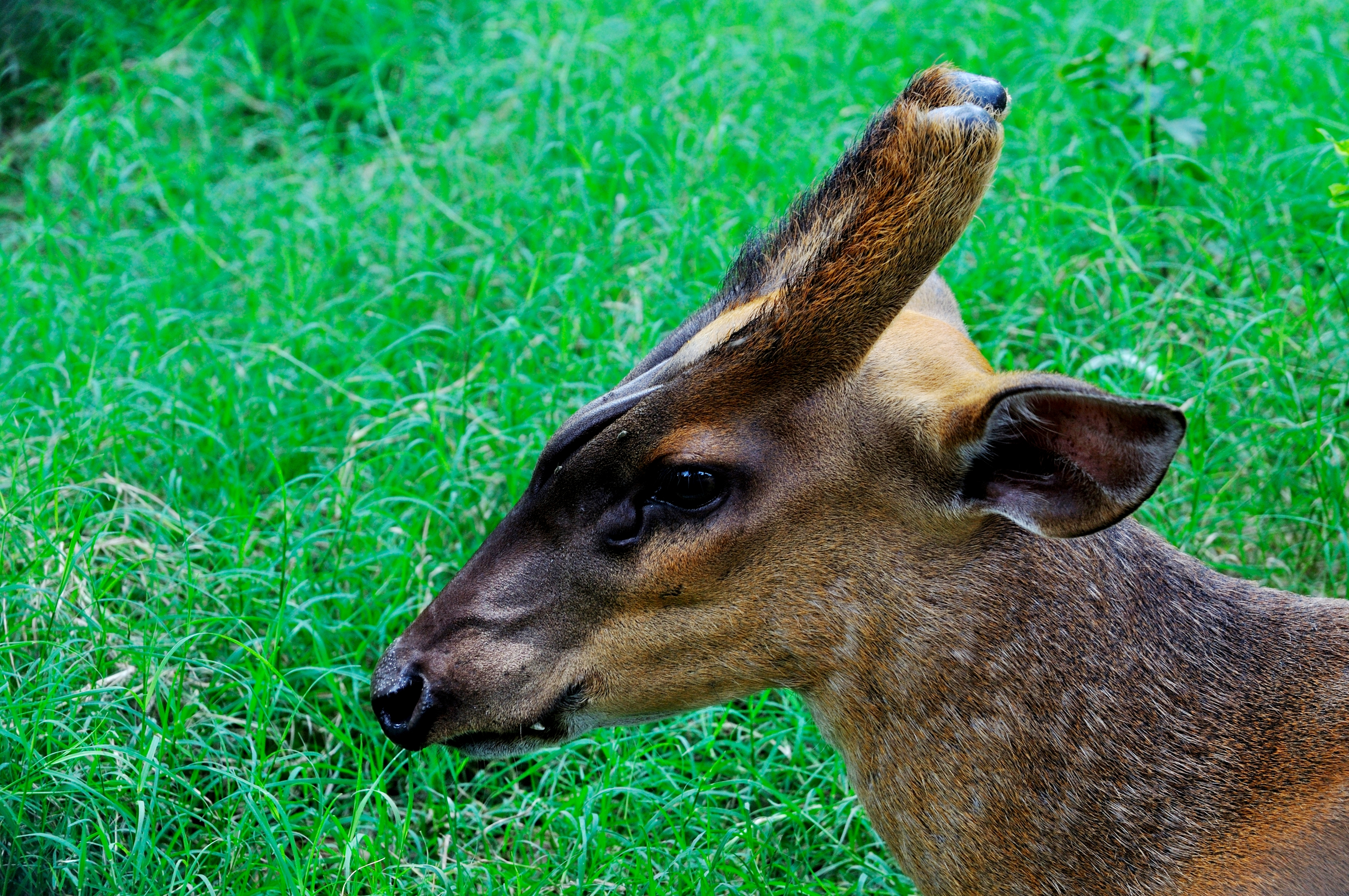
Head of a muntjac buck, showing the slanted, furred pedicles. Its antlers have been shed for summer.

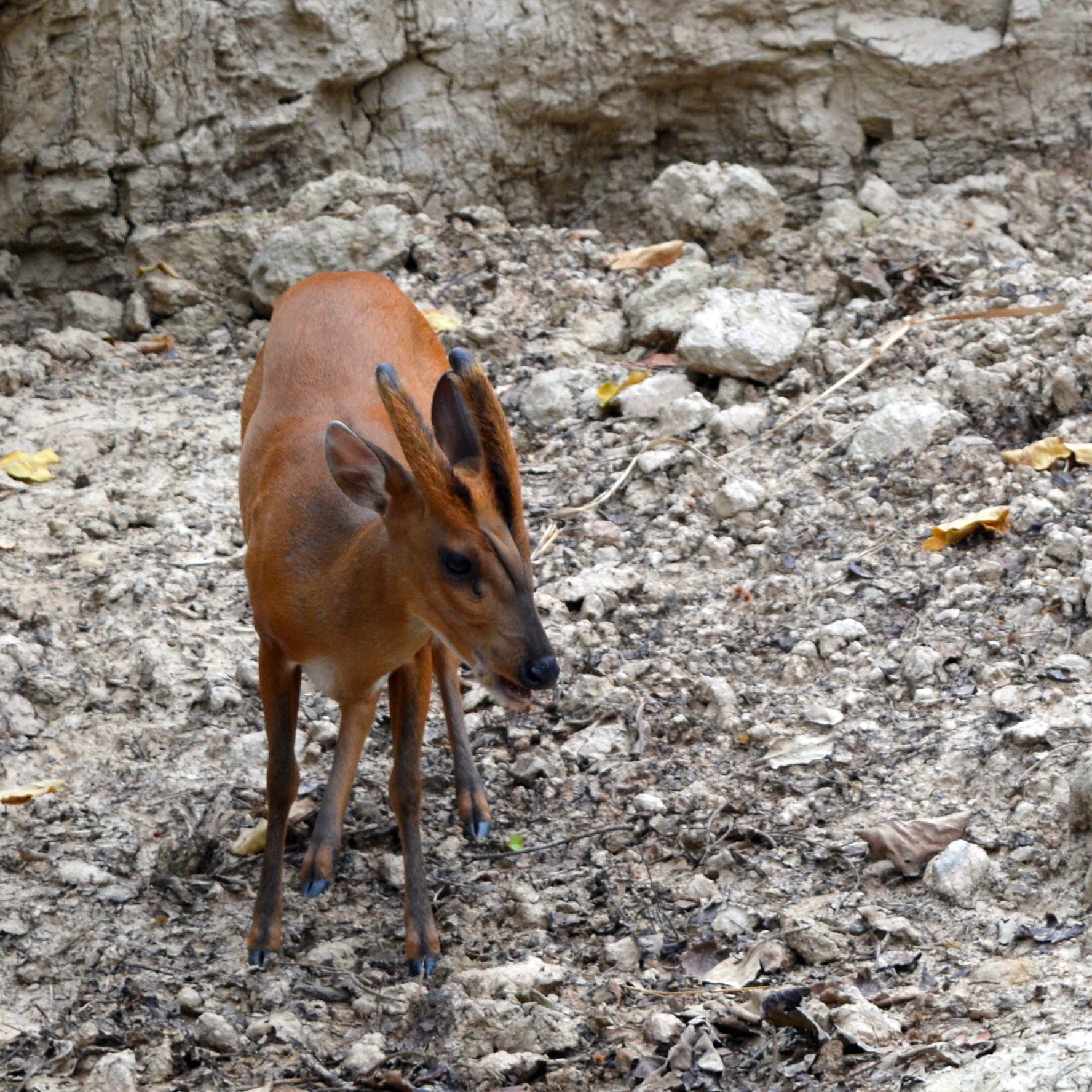
Barking deer in Jim Corbett National Park, India

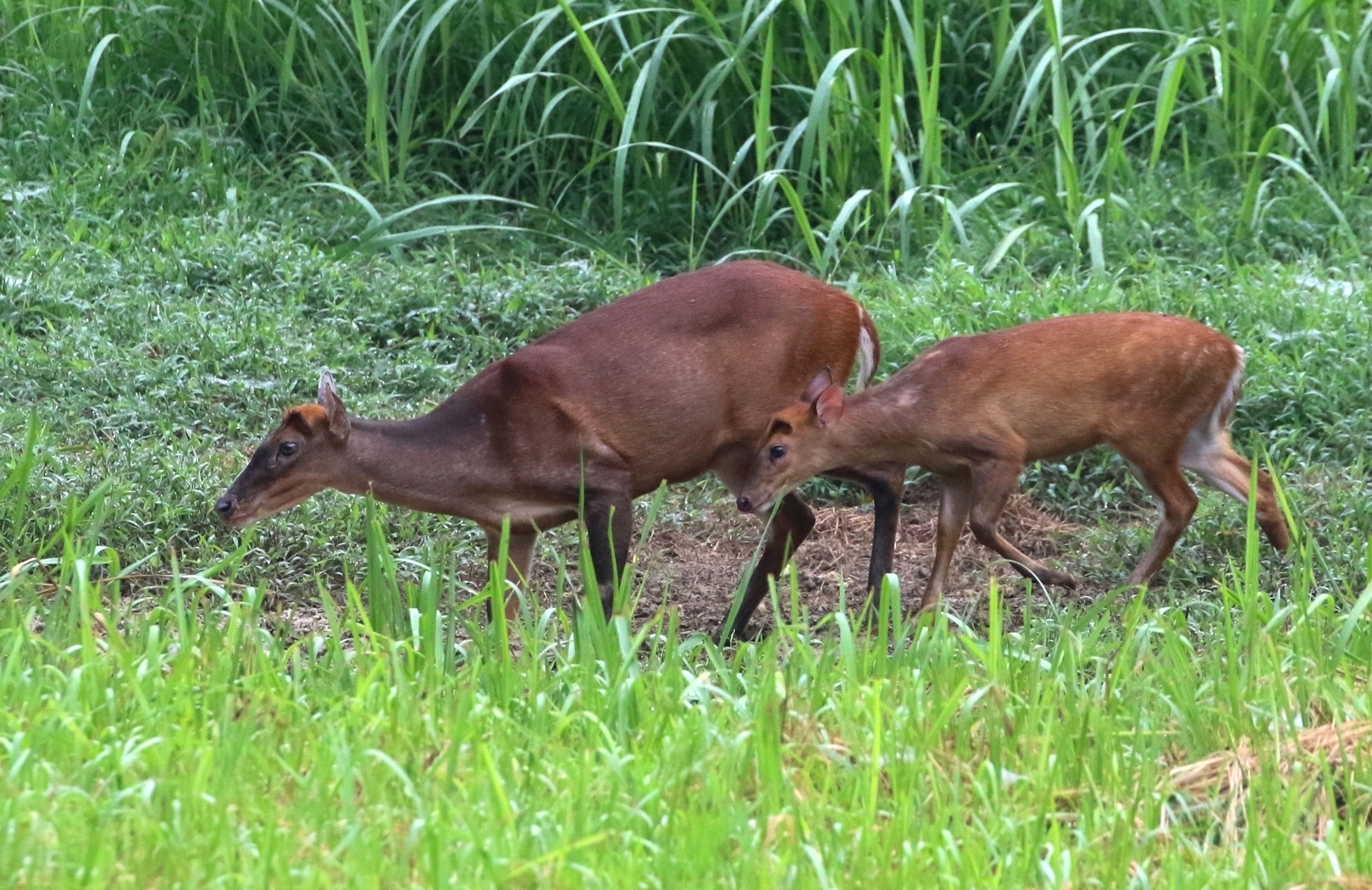
Adult female and her offspring in Malaysia

== See also ==
- Deer of Great Britain
