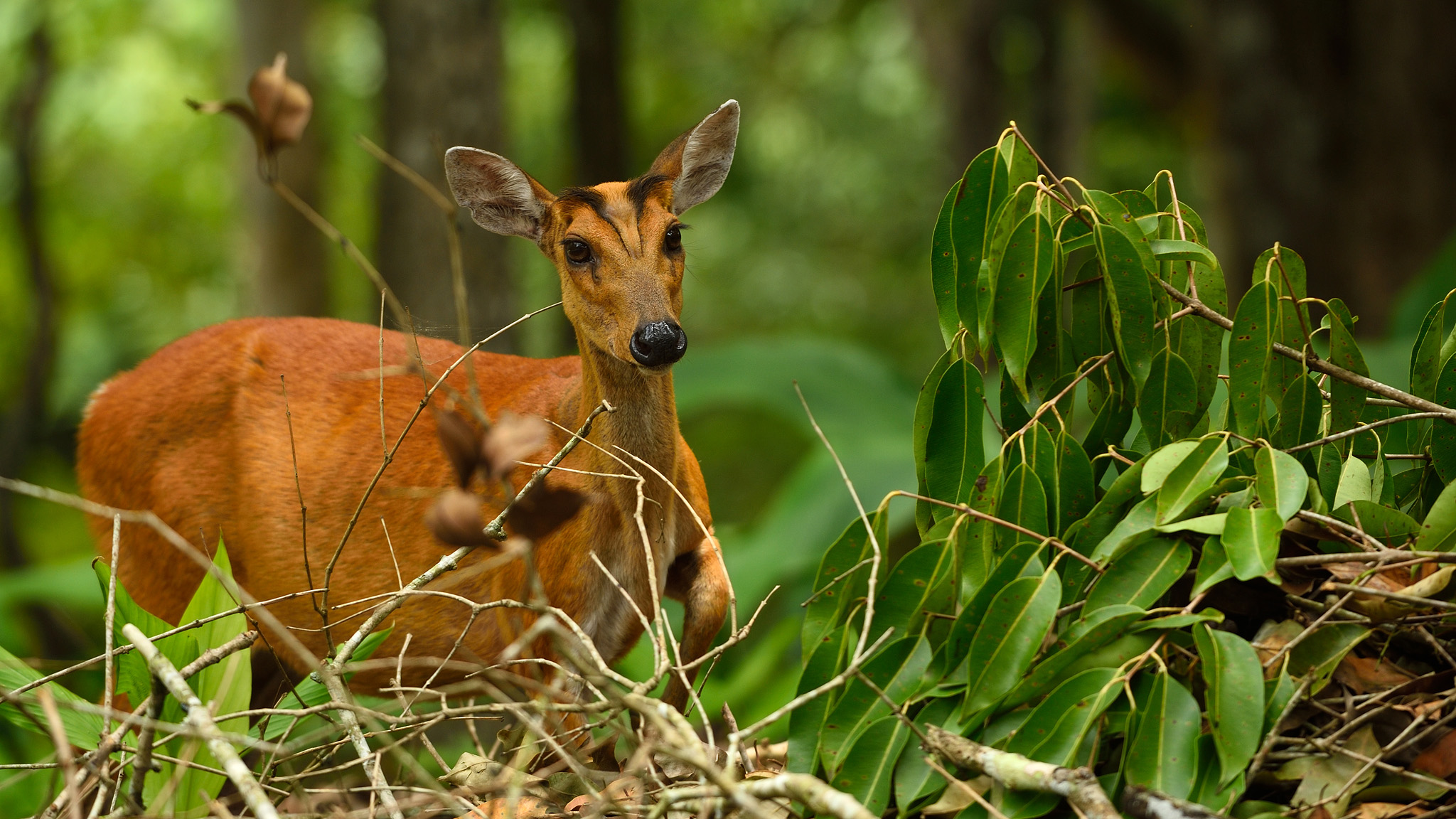
- Female in Khao Yai National Park, Thailand, July 2015

Conservation status
- Least Concern (IUCN 3.1)

Scientific classification
- Kingdom: Animalia
- Phylum: Chordata
- Class: Mammalia
- Order: Artiodactyla
- Family: Cervidae
- Genus: Muntiacus
- Species: M. vaginalis

Binomial name
- Muntiacus vaginalis (Boddaert, 1785)
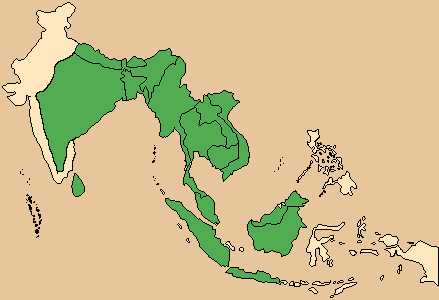
- Range of the northern red muntjac (M. vaginalis) and the southern red muntjac (M. muntjak)

= Northern red muntjac =

Species of ungulate

The northern red muntjac (Muntiacus vaginalis) is a species of muntjac. It is found in numerous countries of south-central and southeast Asia.

The northern red muntjac inhabits various forest types, from tropical rainforests to deciduous and evergreen forests, and is adaptable to secondary forests and human-altered landscapes.

Males are characterized by short antlers and elongated upper canines, which they use in territorial and mating disputes. The species is known for its distinctive bark-like calls, serving as alarm signals (against predators such as pythons, golden jackals, tigers, leopards, and crocodiles) or communication between individuals.

== Taxonomy ==
It was recently found distinct from the southern red muntjac (previously typically known as Indian muntjac) and includes all the population previously attributed to M. muntjak that are outside of Sunda and perhaps of Malaysia.

The subspecies bancanus, montanus, muntjak, nainggolani, peninsulae, pleiharicus, robinsoni, and rubidus stay in the southern red muntjac (M. muntjak), while annamensis, aureus, curvostylis, grandicornis, and nigripes are now attributed to the northern red muntjac (M. vaginalis).

== Distribution ==
The northern red muntjac occurs in twelve countries of south-central and south-east Asia including Pakistan, Bhutan, Myanmar, Nepal, India, Sri Lanka, Bangladesh, China, Cambodia, Laos, Thailand, and Vietnam.

It is also present in Hong Kong. Its presence in Malaysia is uncertain.

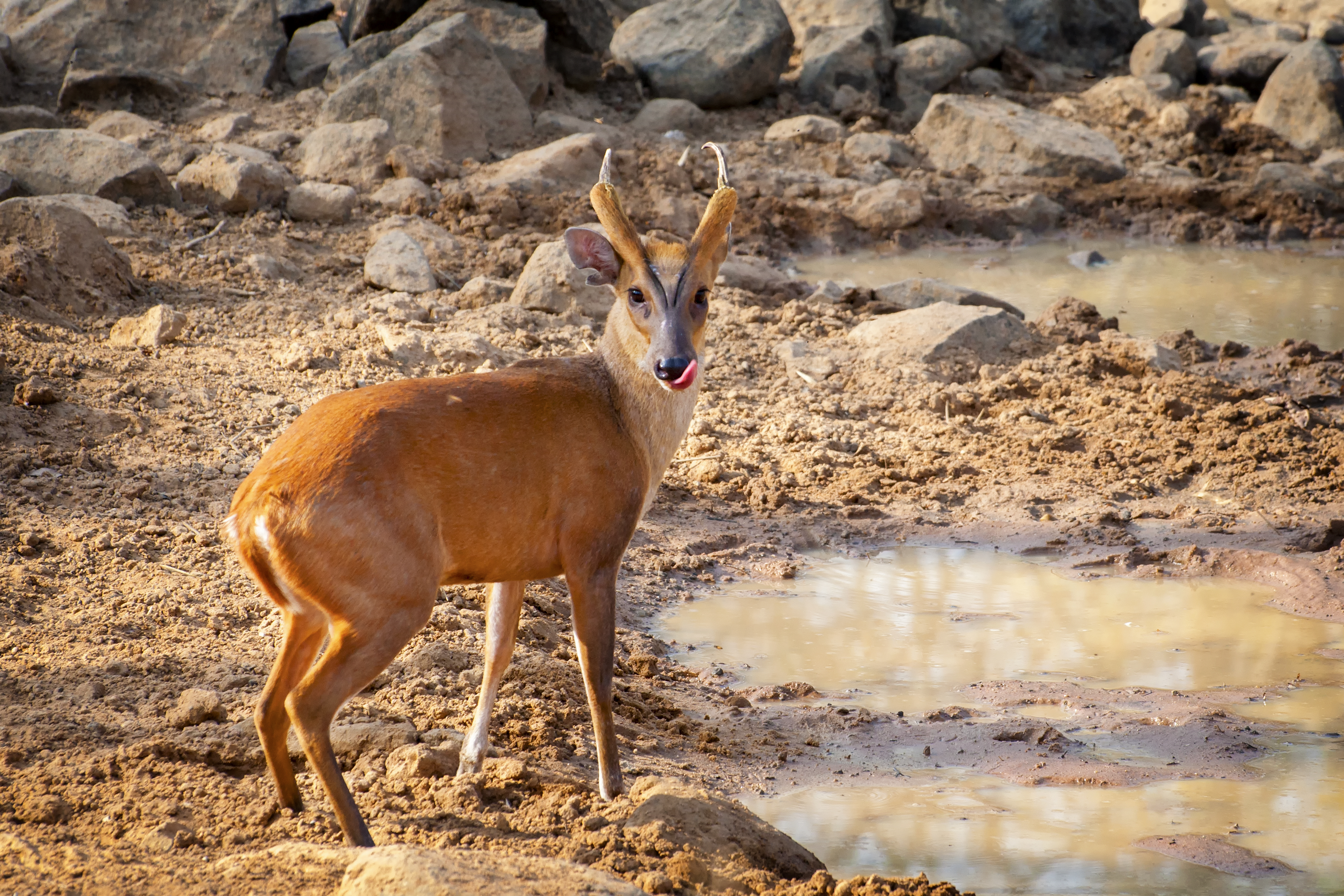
Muntjac at Tadoba National Park, India

== Conservation ==
It is listed as "Least Concern" by the IUCN due to its large distribution, presence in protected areas and resilience to hunting and habitat change.

Due to the degradation of habitat and hunting for their body parts and meat, muntjac populations are drastically decreasing throughout their range.
