= Pu Hoat muntjac =

Conservation status
- Data Deficient (IUCN 3.1)

Scientific classification
- Kingdom: Animalia
- Phylum: Chordata
- Class: Mammalia
- Order: Artiodactyla
- Family: Cervidae
- Genus: Muntiacus
- Species: M. puhoatensis

Binomial name
- Muntiacus puhoatensis Trai in Binh Chau, 1997
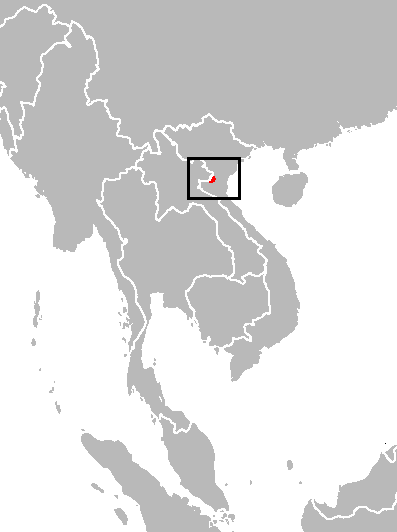
- Pu Hoat muntjac range

Species of deer

The Pu Hoat muntjac (Muntiacus puhoatensis) is a species of muntjac only known from Pu Hoat region in Vietnam, which borders Laos. It is sometimes considered to be conspecific with Roosevelt's muntjac, and its habitat and behavior are likely to be similar.

The Pu Hoat muntjac has only been recorded once at its type locality of Hạnh Dịch Village, Hạnh Dịch Commune, Quế Phong District, Nghệ An Province, Viet Nam.
