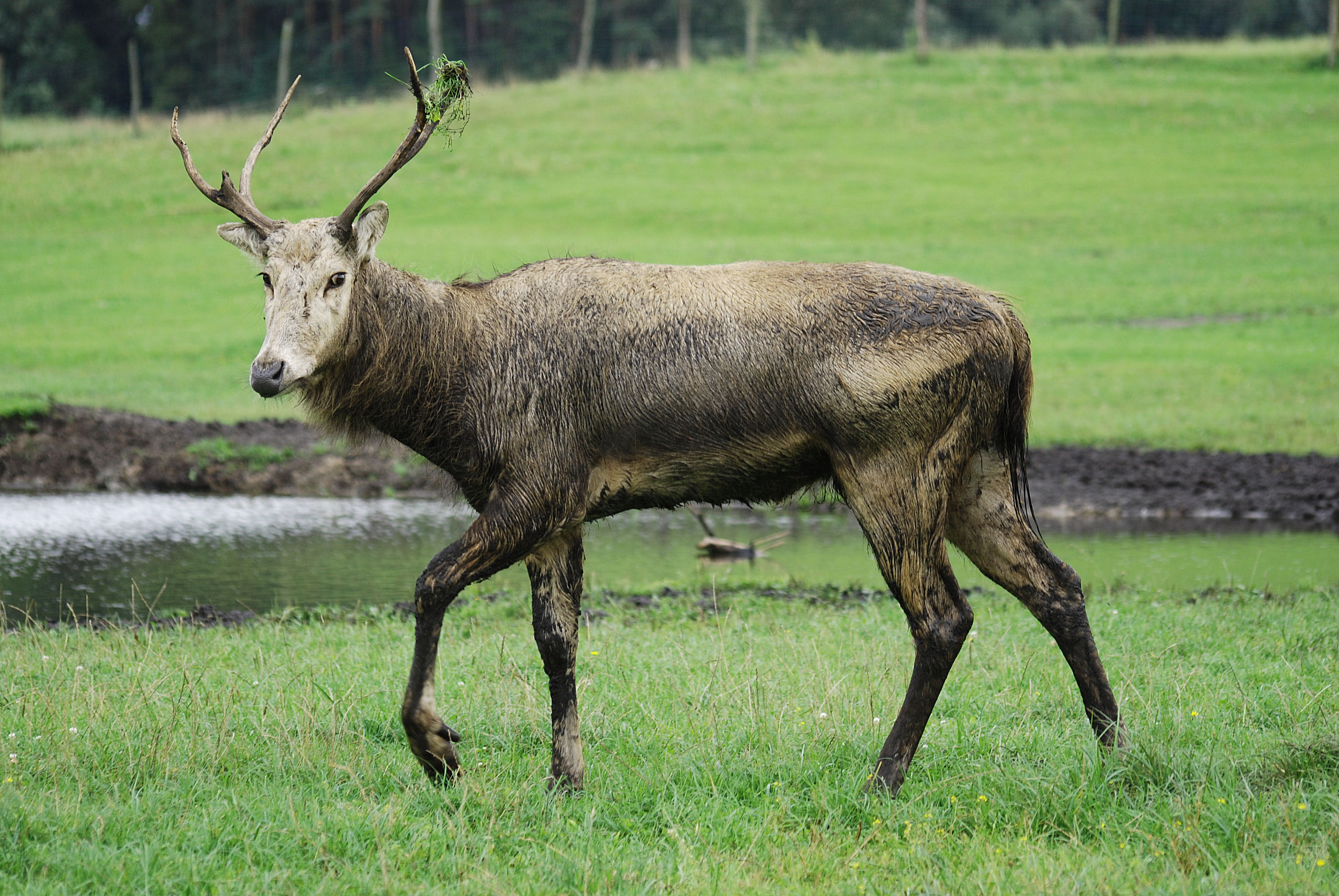

Conservation status
- Extinct in the Wild (IUCN 3.1)

Scientific classification
- Kingdom: Animalia
- Phylum: Chordata
- Class: Mammalia
- Order: Artiodactyla
- Family: Cervidae
- Genus: Elaphurus
- Species: E. davidianus

Binomial name
- Elaphurus davidianus A. Milne-Edwards, 1866

= Père David's deer =

Père David's deer Temporal range: 3–0 Ma Late Pliocene to Holocene

Species of mammals native to China

Père David's deer
- Chinese: 麋鹿
- Literal meaning: "mí-deer"
Transcriptions
Standard Mandarin
- Hanyu Pinyin: mílù
- Wade–Giles: mi^{2}-lu^{4}
- IPA: [mǐ.lû]
Yue: Cantonese
- Jyutping: mei^{4}-luk^{6}
- IPA: [mej˩.lʊk̚˨]
Southern Min
- Hokkien POJ: mi-lok
Middle Chinese
- Middle Chinese: *miei-luk

Elaphurus davidianus

Père David's deer (Elaphurus davidianus), also known as the milu (Chinese: 麋鹿; pinyin: mílù) or elaphure, is a species of deer native to the subtropical river valleys of China. It grazes mainly on grass and aquatic plants. It is the only extant member of the genus Elaphurus. Some experts suggest demoting Elaphurus to a subgenus of Cervus. Based on genetic comparisons, Père David's deer is closely related to Eld's deer.

Père David's deer were hunted almost to extinction in their native China by the late 19th century, but a number were taken to zoos in France and Germany and the deer was bred successfully in captivity. In the early 20th century, the British nobleman and politician Herbrand Russell, 11th Duke of Bedford, acquired a few Père David's deer from the Berlin Zoo and built up a large herd on his estate at Woburn Abbey. In the 1980s, the duke's great-grandson Robin Russell, 14th Duke of Bedford, donated several dozen deer to the Chinese government for reintroducing the species to the wild. In 2020, the wild population in China was estimated at 2,825 individuals, with a further 7,380 in various nature reserves in China. All Père David's deer alive today descend from Herbrand Russell's original herd.

== Demography ==
Père David's deer is endemic to the Chinese region. According to fossil records, the species first appeared during the Pleistocene period, when it could be found across Manchuria. This demography changed during the Holocene period; during this time, the species could only be found in the swamp lands and wetlands of southern China. Due to hunting and land reclamation, the population of the Père David's deer became even smaller. By 1939, the last of the wild species were shot and killed.

== Naming and etymology ==
This species of deer was first made known to Western science in 1866 by Armand David (Père David), a French missionary working in China. He obtained some hides and the carcasses of an adult male, an adult female and a young male, and sent them to Paris, where the species was named "Père David's deer" by Alphonse Milne-Edwards, a French biologist. The binomial nomenclature, Elaphurus davidianus, was also given by Milne-Edwards, with the generic name formed from the Greek word ἔλαφος ('stag') and οὐρά ('tail').

The species is sometimes known by its informal name sibuxiang (Chinese: 四不像; pinyin: sìbúxiàng; Japanese: shifuzō), literally meaning "four not alike", which could mean "the four unlikes" or "like none of the four"; it is variously said that the four are cow, deer, donkey, horse (or) camel, and that the expression means in detail:

- "the hooves of a cow but not a cow, the neck of a camel but not a camel, antlers of a deer but not a deer, the tail of a donkey but not a donkey".
- "the nose of a cow but not a cow, the antlers of a deer but not a deer, the body of a donkey but not a donkey, tail of a horse but not a horse"
- "the tail of a donkey, the head of a horse, the hoofs of a cow, the antlers of a deer"
- "the neck of a camel, the hoofs of a cow, the tail of a donkey, the antlers of a deer"
- "the antlers of a deer, the head of a horse and the body of a cow"

By this name, this undomesticated animal entered Chinese mythology as the mount of Jiang Ziya in Fengshen Bang (translated as Investiture of the Gods), a Chinese classical work of fiction written during the Ming dynasty.

== Characteristics ==
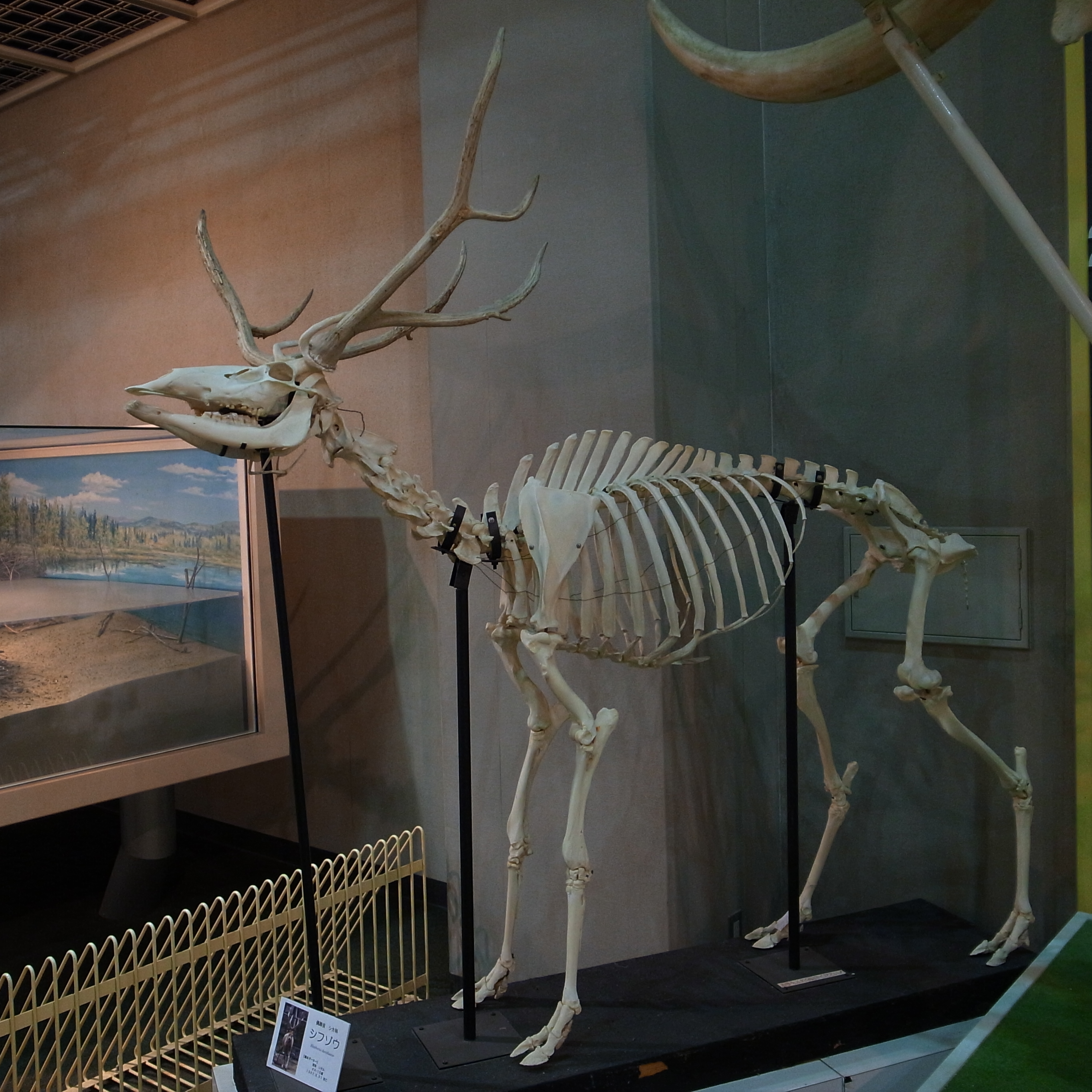
Skeleton of a stag (male) at Kobe Oji Zoo in Kobe, Japan

The adult Père David's deer reaches a head-and-body length of up to 1.9–2.2 meters (6.2–7.2 ft) and stands about 1.2 meters (3.9 ft) tall at the shoulder. The tail is relatively long for a deer, measuring 50–66 centimeters (20–26 in) when straightened. Weight is between 135 and 200 kilograms (300 and 440 lb). The head is long and slender with large eyes, very large preorbital glands, a naked nose pad and small, pointed ears.

The branched antlers are unique in that the long tines point backward, while the main beam extends almost directly upward. There may be two pairs per year. The summer antlers are the larger set, and are dropped in November, after the summer rut. The second set—if they appear—are fully grown by January, and fall off a few weeks later.

The coat is reddish tan in the summer, changing to a dull gray in the winter. Long wavy guard hairs are present on and coat throughout the year, with the coat becoming woolier in winter. There is a mane on the neck and throat and a black dorsal stripe running along the cervicothoracic spine. The tail is about 50 centimeters (20 in) in length, with a dark tuft at the end. The hooves are large and spreading, and make clicking sounds (as in the reindeer) when the animal is moving.

A semiaquatic animal, Père David's deer swims well, spending long periods standing in water up to its shoulders. Although predominantly a grazer, the deer supplements its grass diet with aquatic plants in the summer.

== Behavior ==
Père David's deer has similar reproductive physiological mechanisms to other deer species living in temperate latitudes. These mechanisms aid in the adaptation to a high-latitude environment. The reproductive behavior in stags differs from hinds. In stags rutting behavior includes urine sniffing, anogenital sniffing, wallowing, and antler adorning. Communication behavior includes the spraying of urine and preorbital gland marking. The stags generally begin to rut before any signs of female sexual behavior. The reason to this is to establish a social rank among the stags. For Père David's deer the stag initiates the breeding season with the rutting. In hinds, estrous behavior includes urinating frequently, receptivity, and allowing the stags to mount. Parental behavior involves sniffing the calf, calling, and rubbing the face of the calf. The hind has a typical behavior of being solitary.

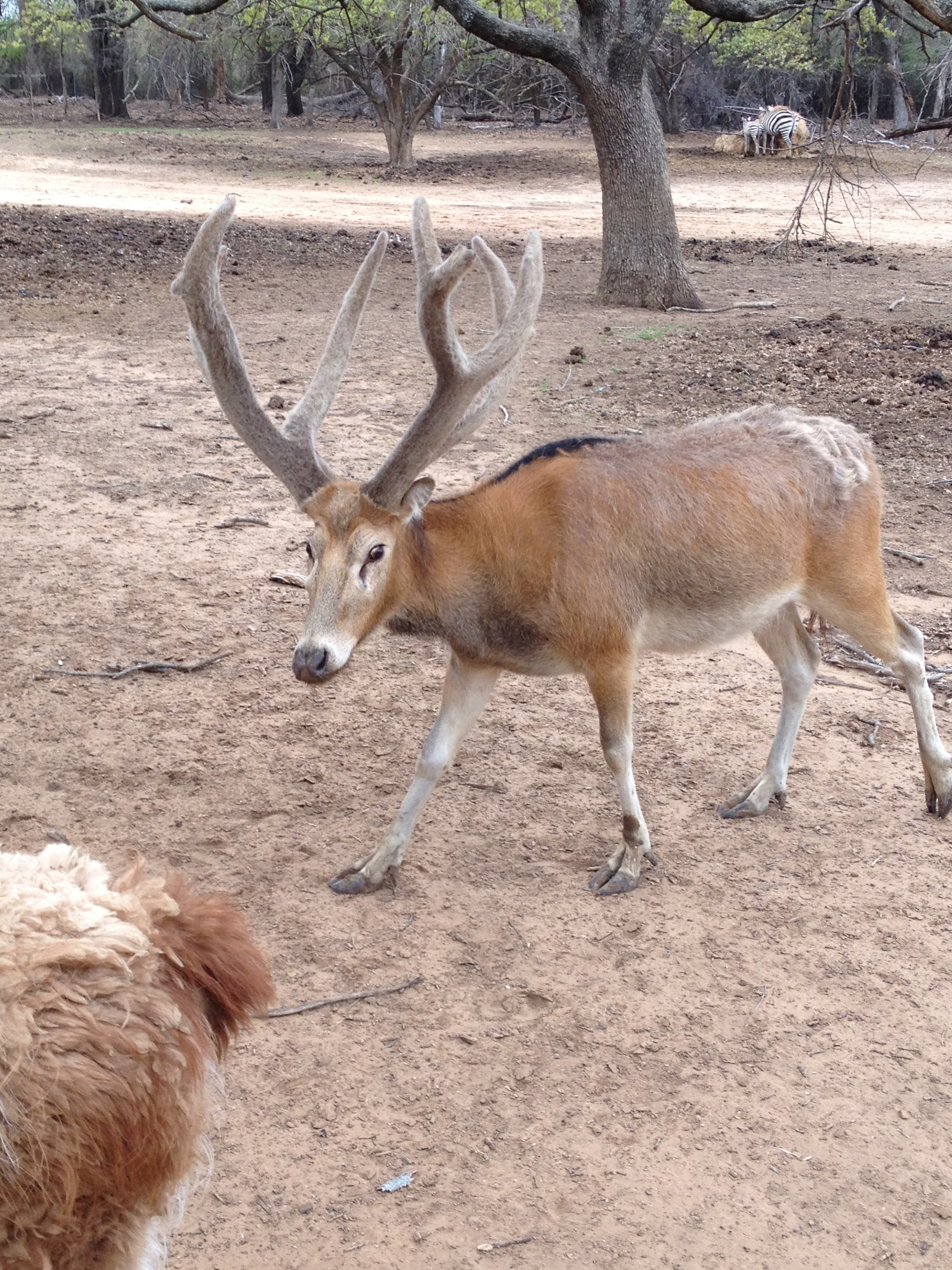
Père David's deer (male) at Sharkarosa Ranch, 2014

=== Birth and lifespan ===
The gestation period is about nine months, roughly around 280 days, after which a single offspring is usually born; twins are born rarely. The gestation period is significantly longer than any other deer besides the roe deer. Père David's deer are considered seasonal breeders because three out of four calves are born during April in captive European populations. The breeding season is 160 days with the mating season usually being in June and July. Calf weight, calculated using Robbins and Robbins equation, tends to be between 11.3 and 13.2 kg (25 and 29 lb). The juveniles (referred to as either fawns or calves) have a spotted coat, as is commonly seen in most species of deer. They are known to develop very quickly after birth. They reach sexual maturity at about 14 months. The average lifespan of a Père David deer is up to 18 years.

=== In captivity ===
An experiment was conducted to show how captivity would affect the deer's behavior and survival rate. Two areas were created; one with a large area containing a few Père David's deer present and one with a small area containing a high concentration of Père David's deer present. It was found when in captivity, it is best to keep the deer in large open areas that allow for adequate space with a reasonable number of individual deer living in the area; if put in a small area with a multitude of individuals present, stress amongst the deer will build up. Studies have shown through the high concentration of fecal matter in an area of captivity with limited space and a large number of Père David deer that they have shown different behavioral patterns to their wild counterparts. These deer would spend less time resting, and would stand longer due to human presence as well as display social aggression and competition over food sources. It is therefore unwise to keep them in small, densely populated areas to prevent accumulation of stress and aggression against each other.

Père David's deer has been in isolation from the wild for more than 1200 years, causing humans to be the primary perceived threat due to a long-term lack of exposure to other natural predators. When encountering humans, the deer's response varies according to sex. Female-only groups display a lower degree of caution towards humans than in male-only groups. It was hypothesized that the presence of a single type of threat may be sufficient to maintain anti-predator responses in the face of relaxed predation pressure. During rutting season, the does will display increased vigilance and heightened threat perception, likely in response to the mating activities of the males.

=== Predation ===
Historically, the main predators of the Père David's deer are believed to have been tigers and leopards. Although they no longer encounter these predators while living in captivity, while experimenting with exposures to images and stimuli relating to these big cats, the deer seemed to instinctively react with a cautious predator–prey response typical of wild deer.

== Population ==
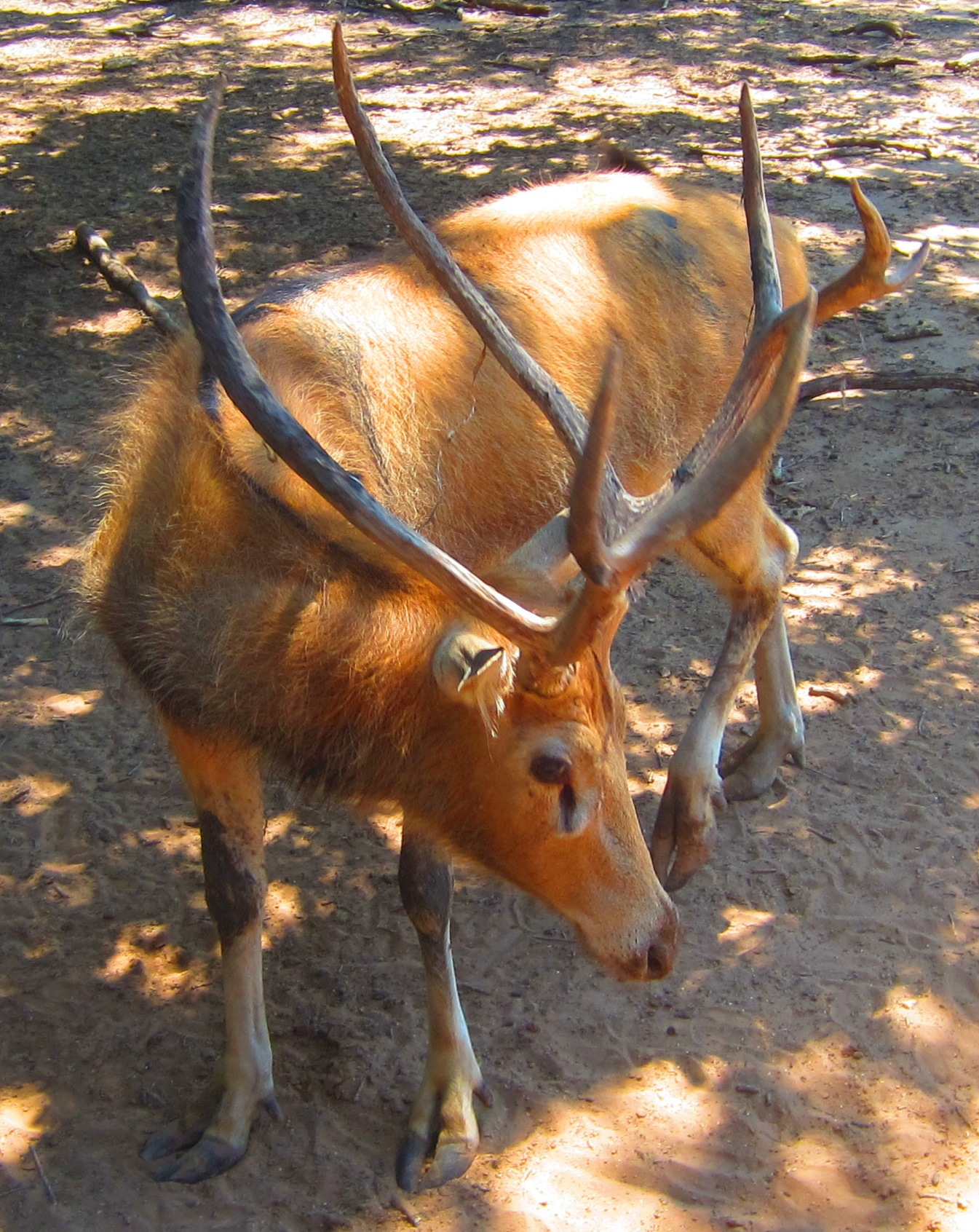
Père David's deer (male), with characteristic large preorbital glands, black dorsal stripe and large, spreading hooves

In Neolithic times, the milu's range extended across much of China proper. Archaeologists have found milu antlers at settlements from the Liao River in the north to Jiangsu and Zhejiang Province and across the Yellow and Yangtze River Basins in Shaanxi and Hunan Province. According to official data, the total population of the species has exceeded 8,000 in China. Milu is also under first-class state protection in China. In 1985, China Biodiversity Conservation and Green Development Foundation (CBCGDF) was established to help receive 22 Père David's deer from the Marquess of Tavistock of Woburn Abbey, England, as a gift to return to their ancestral soil.

=== Extirpation in China ===
The last known wild herd was on Hainan Island. It was still present in 1868 when two skins were purchased by Robert Swinhoe. The exact date of the extinction of the Hainan Island population is unknown with ambiguous references suggesting its possible it survived into the 20th century.

In the late 19th century a captive herd belonged to Tongzhi, the Emperor of China. The herd was maintained in the Nanyuan Royal Hunting Garden in Nan Haizi, near Peking. In 1895, one of the walls of the hunting garden was destroyed by a heavy flood of the Yongding River and "the starving peasants, made homeless by the same flood, killed and ate every animal in sight, including all the Milus [deer]". After the extirpation of the Chinese population in 1900, the English nobleman Herbrand Russell, 11th Duke of Bedford, was instrumental in saving the species. He acquired the few remaining deer from European zoos and formed a breeding herd in the deer park at his home at Woburn Abbey in Bedfordshire. The herd started with 18 deer of which 11 were able to breed.

Threatened again by both World Wars, the species survived largely due to the efforts of Bedford and his son Hastings, later 12th Duke of Bedford. The current world population, now found in zoos around the world, stems from the Woburn Abbey herd.

=== Reintroduction ===
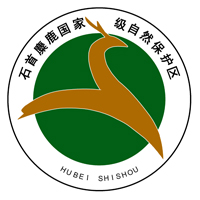
Shishou Milu National Nature Reserve

Reintroduction of Père David's deer to China began in 1985, with a herd of 20 deer (5 males and 15 females). This was followed in 1987 by a second herd, consisting of 18 deer (all females). Both herds had been drawn from the Woburn Abbey herd and were donated by Robin Russell, Marquess of Tavistock (d. 2003; the future 14th Duke of Bedford), the 11th duke's great-grandson. In 2005 the Beijing authorities erected a statue of the 14th duke at Nan Haizi to mark the 20th anniversary of the Milu reintroduction. The transportation was sponsored by the World Wildlife Fund. The relic site of the Nanyuan (or Nan Haizi) Royal Hunting Garden in the southern suburbs of Beijing was chosen as the site of re-introduction, creating the Beijing Milu Park. The population in China expanded to around 2,000 in 2005.

A second re-introduction into China was conducted in 1986 where 36 Père David's deer were chosen from five UK zoological gardens with the bulk of the deer coming from Whipsnade Wild Animal Park in Bedfordshire. These deer were introduced into Dafeng Milu National Nature Reserve, near the Yellow Sea coast in eastern China. In 2006 the population at this Nature Reserve had reached around 950 with an average annual population increase of 17%.

In 1993, 30 deer taken from the herd at Beijing Milu Park were released into the Tian'ezhou Milu National Nature Reserve (a.k.a. Shishou Milu National Nature Reserve) in Tian'ezhou, Shishou. These were followed by another 34 deer taken from Beijing Park and released into the Tian'ezhou Reserve. In a 1998 flood, a number of deer escaped from the reserve and have since been living and multiplying in the wild. As of 2015, the number of deer living in the wild was 700. The average annual population growth rate for Père David's deer in Tianezhou Nature Reserve was 22.2%.

In 2002, 30 deer taken from the herd at Beijing Milu Park and 20 from Dafeng Nature Reserve were released into the Yuanyang Yellow River Nature Reserve.

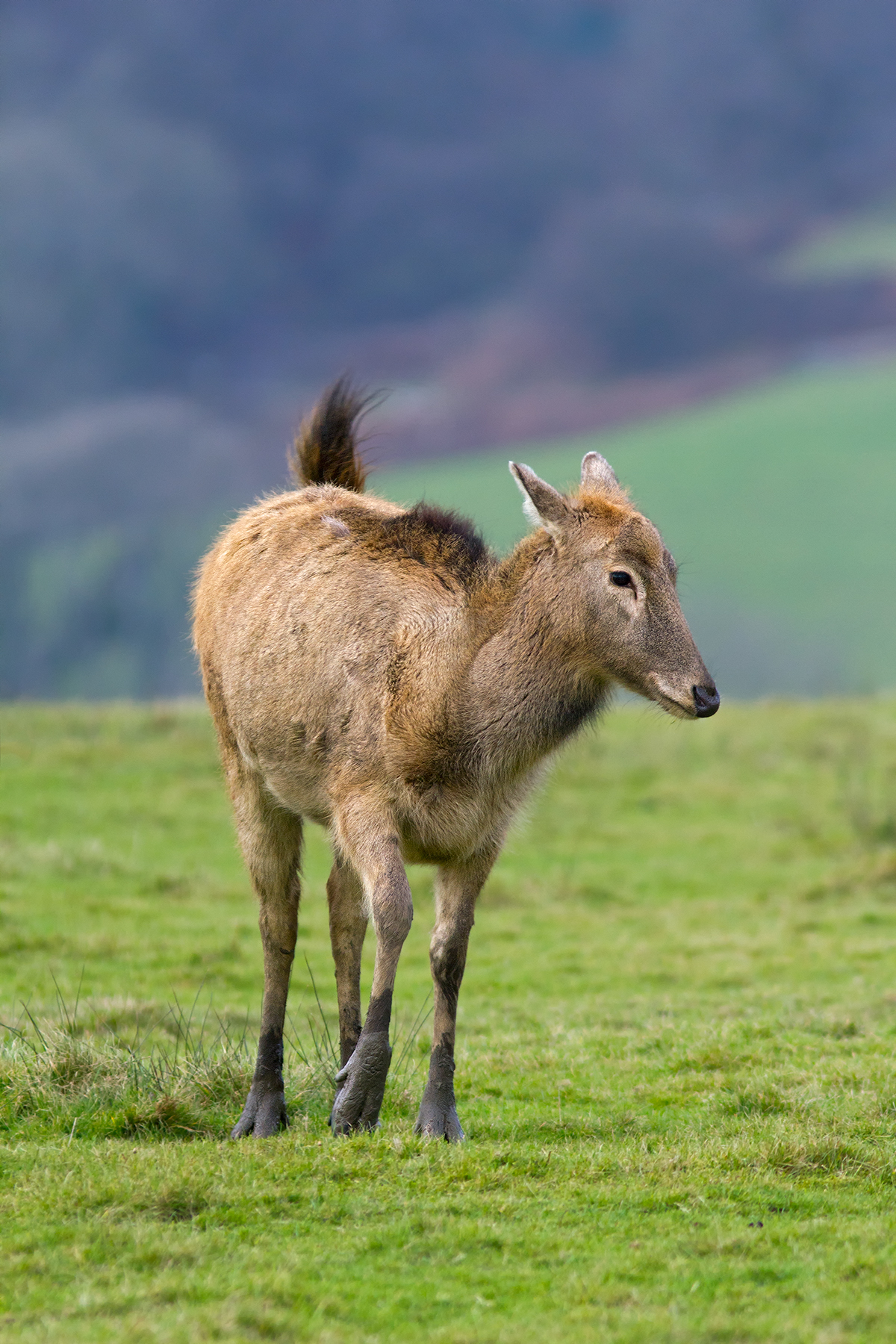
Père David's deer (female)

When the species was assessed for the IUCN Red List (1996), it was classified as "critically endangered" in the wild, under criterion "D": "[wild] population estimated to number less than 50 mature individuals". In October 2008, they were officially listed as extinct in the wild. Upon the status being updated in March 2016, it was clarified on this species' IUCN Red List page that it would remain listed as "Extinct in the Wild" until the reintroduced population proved long-term viability. As of 2003, there were 53 herds of Père David's deer in China. Nine of the herds consist of 25 or fewer deer, and the remaining herds have fewer than 10 deer. Due to the small population size, a lack of genetic diversity is expected, but in spite of the small population size, the animals do not appear to suffer genetic problems from the genetic bottleneck. The captive population in China has increased in recent years, and the possibility remains that free-ranging populations can be reintroduced in the near future.

When reintroduced into their habitat, the species could face many problems due to years in captivity. Relaxed selection and reproduction with no environmental pressure may have taken place for Père David's deer, due to captive breeding, which can result in the loss of adaptive anti-predator behavior. It is possible that when fully released in the environment from captivity, after generations of offspring, the species could be unable to retain parasite-defense behaviors like grooming. If the population is reintroduced into the environment with no protection against tick infestation, then they can face major problems if not adapted to that environment. Père David's deer may also become confused by other predators such as tigers, since they are no longer adapted to them. A study was done on members of the species in captivity using the sounds of wild tigers roaring and domestic dogs barking, and the deer did not respond to the barking of the dogs, but hearing the tiger roar caused the deer to spend more time being cautious after hearing the sound, thus showing that the deer still retained ancestral memories of their previous predator, the tiger.

=== Red deer hybrid ===
Though New Zealand lacked its own terrestrial mammals, European settlers had introduced numerous species of deer into the land for the use of farming and hunting. Some of these deer species had crossbred in the wild, creating hybrids, which in turn were then utilized in deer farms based on their apparent genetic improvements. Alongside this discovery, deer farms began the practice of inciting hybridization in order to encourage genetic advancement. This includes a hybrid between Père David's deer and Red deer. These F1 hybrids are unique for several reasons. Both male and female offspring of this hybrid remain fertile, a rare prospect especially for species that have such a genetic distance. Both species differ in seasonal behaviors, gestation length, behavioral traits, morphology, maturity size, and disease resistance. Père David's deer is also unique in that its antlers are unlike any other deer in the world. However, due to having different seasonal behavior each species would enter their mating season at different intervals, thus preventing natural mating from occurring. In response, artificial insemination was employed on Red deer hinds with the semen from Père David's deer. These F1 hybrids did not share similar mating seasons with Père David's deer and as such were able to successfully mate with other red deer naturally. Three F1 hybrid stags successfully mated naturally in a period from 1989 to 1991 with 144 hinds and semen had been used to artificially inseminate 114 other Red deer hinds producing over 300 backcross hybrids.

== Legend and cultural significance ==
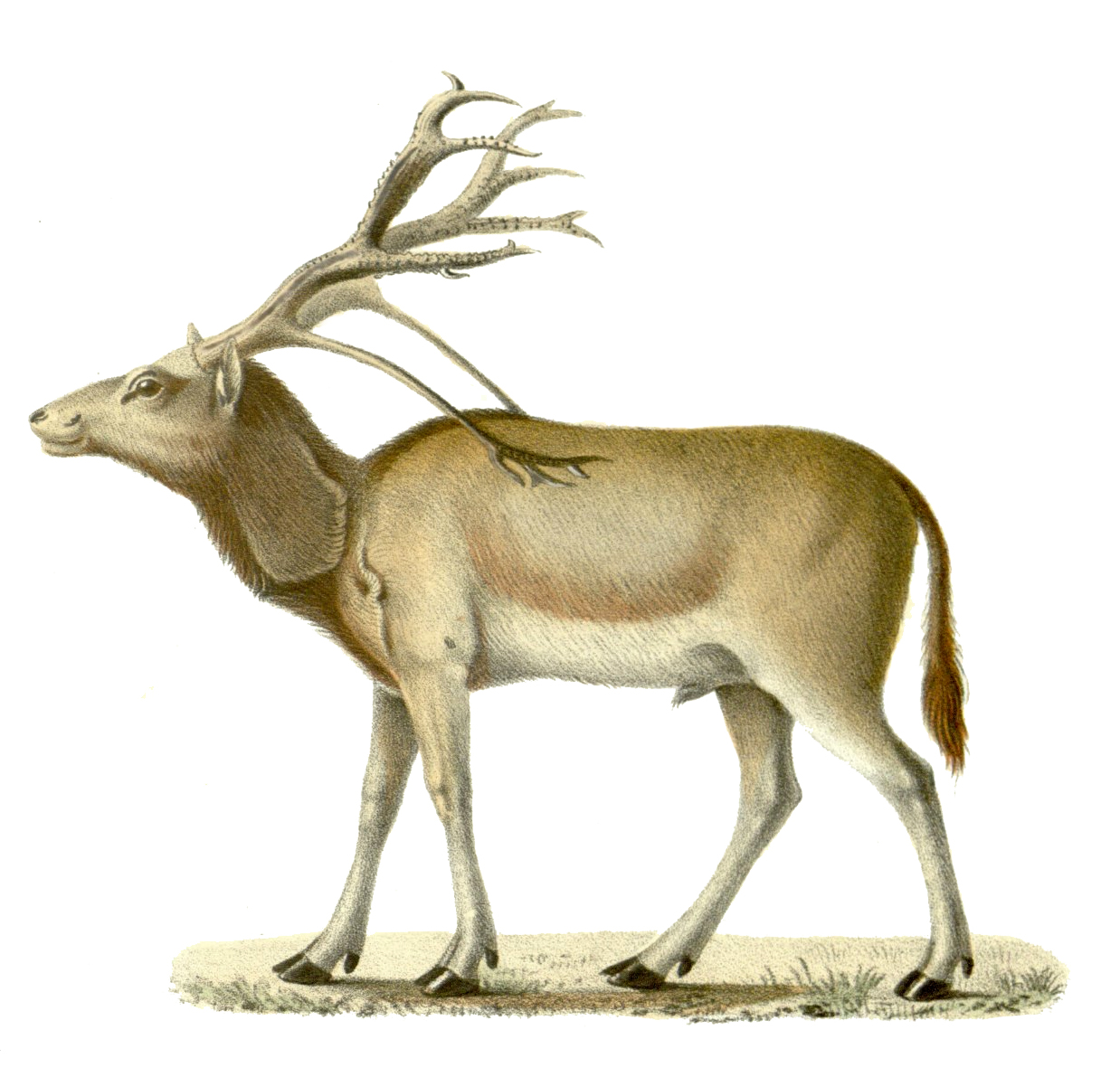
Illustration of Père David's deer from Nouvelles Archives du Muséum d'histoire Naturelle, 1866

According to Chinese legend, when the tyrant Di Xin ruled the land more than 3,000 years ago, a horse, a donkey, an ox and a deer went into a cave in the forest to meditate and on the day the King executed his minister Bigan, the animals awoke from their meditation and turned into humans. They entered society, learned of the King's heinous acts and wanted to take recourse against the King, who was powerful. So they transformed themselves into one creature that combined the speed of the horse, the strength of the ox, the donkey's keen sense of direction and the nimble agility of the deer. This new animal then galloped to the Kunlun Mountains to seek the advice of the Primeval Lord of Heaven. The Lord was astonished at the sight of a creature that had antlers of a deer, hooves of an ox, face of a horse and tail of a donkey. "It's unlike any of four creatures!" he exclaimed. Upon learning of the animal's quest, Lord gave his blessing and dispatched the creature to his disciple the sage Jiang Ziya, who was battling the King. Jiang Ziya rode the creature to victory over the King and helped found the Zhou dynasty. After fulfilling its vow, the milu settled in the lower reaches of the Yangtze River. The animal became a symbol of good fortune and was sought by later emperors who believed eating the meat of the milu would lead to everlasting life.

== See also ==
- List of endangered and protected species of China
