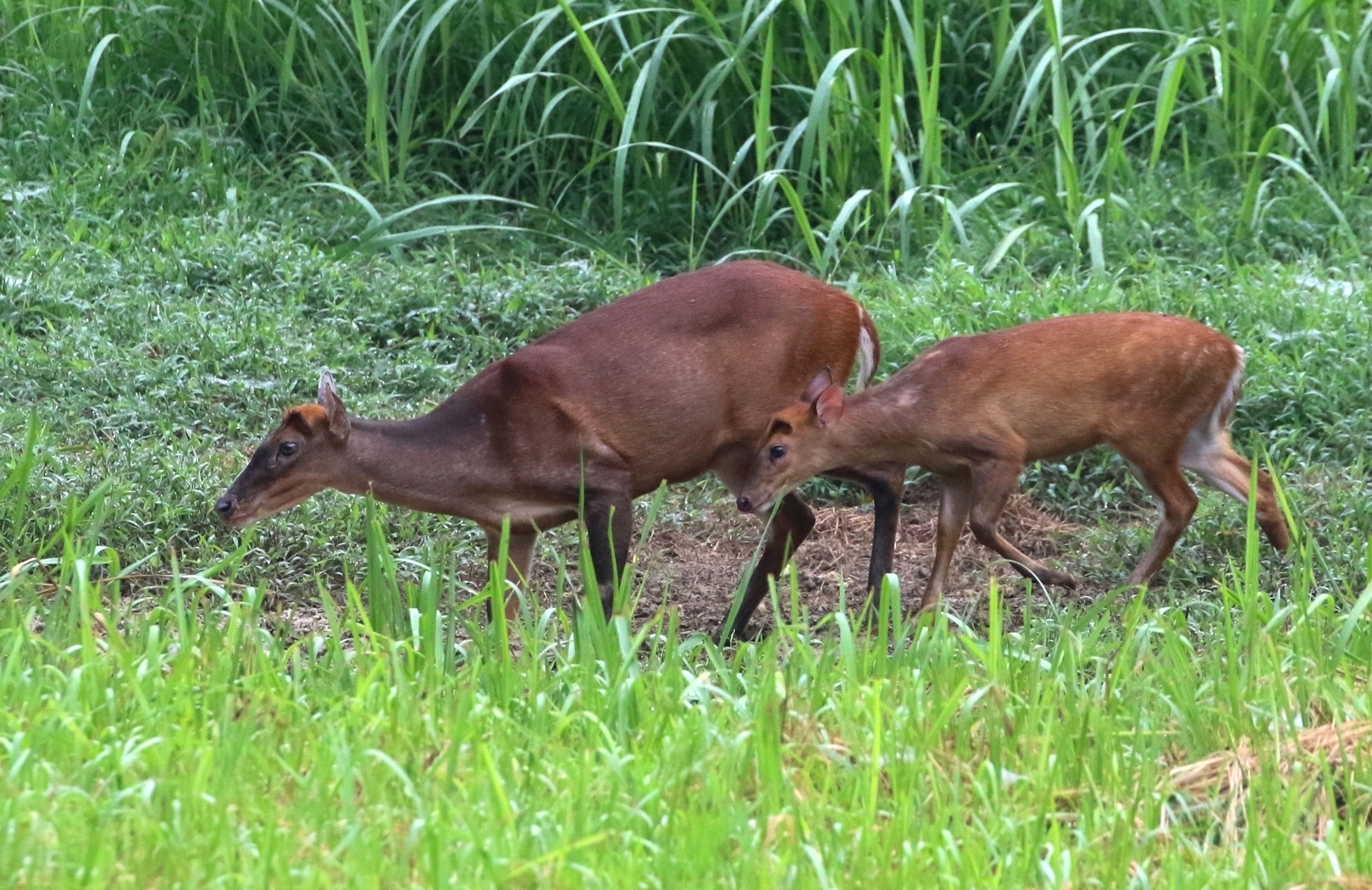
- A doe and fawn in Peninsular Malaysia

Conservation status
- Least Concern (IUCN 3.1)

Scientific classification
- Kingdom: Animalia
- Phylum: Chordata
- Class: Mammalia
- Order: Artiodactyla
- Family: Cervidae
- Genus: Muntiacus
- Species: M. muntjak

Binomial name
- Muntiacus muntjak (Zimmermann, 1780)
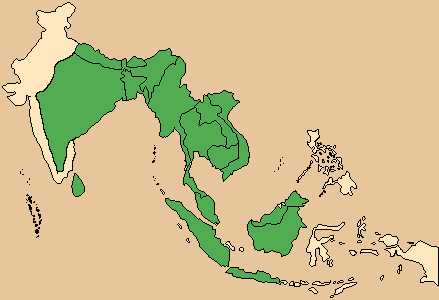
- Combined ranges of the northern red muntjac (M. vaginalis) and southern red muntjac (M. muntjak)

Synonyms
- Cervus muntjac

= Southern red muntjac =

Species of deer

The southern red muntjac (Muntiacus muntjak) is a deer species native to Southeast Asia. It was formerly known as the Indian muntjac or the common muntjac before the species was taxonomically revised to represent only populations of Thailand, Sunda and perhaps Malaysia. The other populations being attributed to this species are now attributed to Muntiacus vaginalis (northern red muntjac). Muntjacs are also referred to as barking deer. It is listed as Least Concern on the IUCN Red List.

This muntjac has soft, short, brownish or grayish hair, sometimes with creamy markings. It is among the smallest deer species. It is an omnivore and eats grass, fruit, shoots, seeds, bird eggs, and small animals, and occasionally scavenges on carrion. Its calls sound like barking, often when frightened by a predator (such as pythons, tigers, leopards, and crocodiles), hence the common name "barking deer". Males have canines, short antlers that usually branch just once near the base, and a large postorbital scent gland used to mark territories.

== Characteristics ==
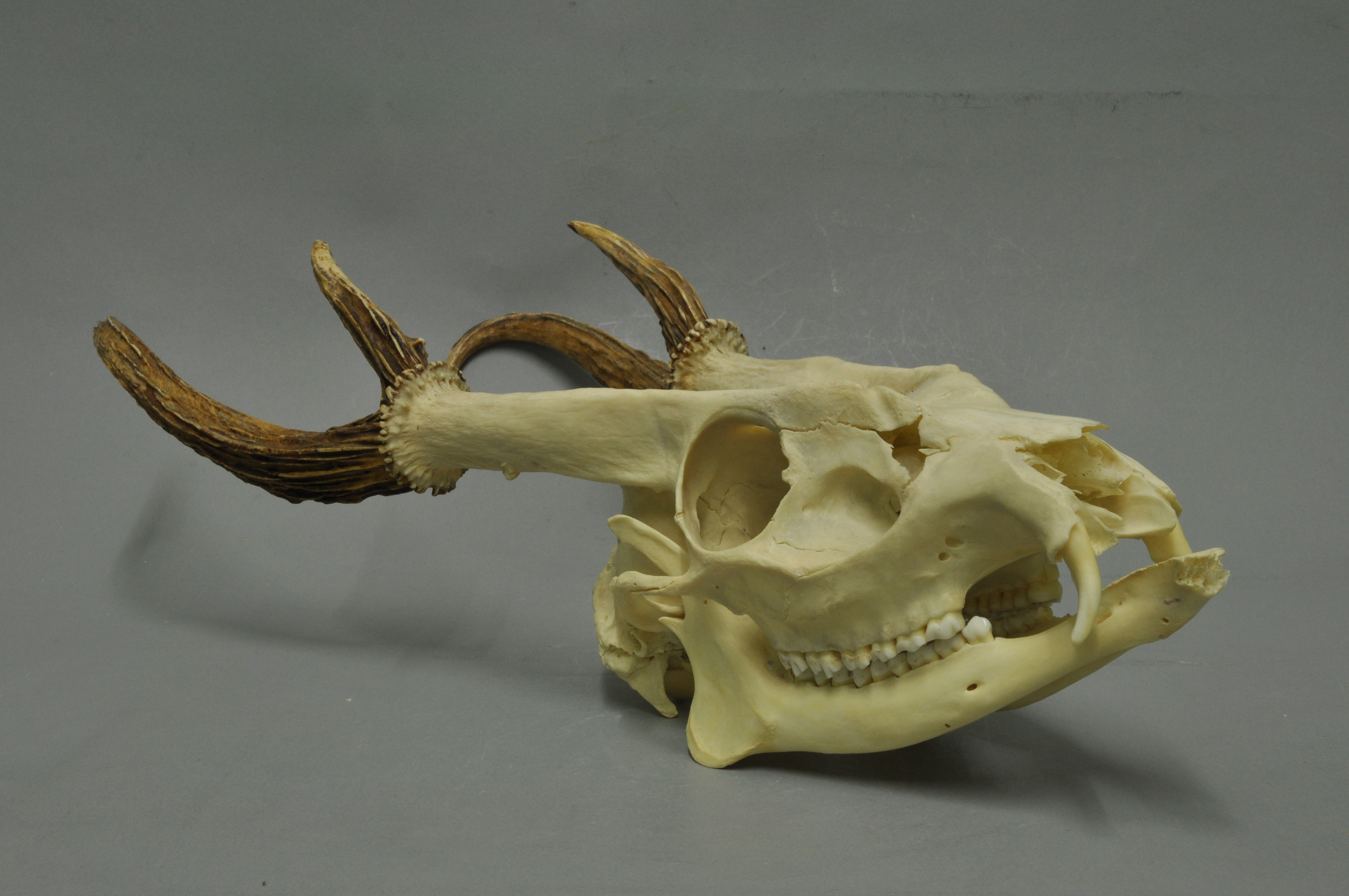
Skull of a mature buck showing slanted pedicles, antlers and canine teeth

The southern red muntjac has a short but very soft, thick, dense coat that is more dense in cooler regions. Its face is darker and the limbs are dark to reddish brown and the coat color seasonally varies from darker brown to yellowish and grayish brown and is white ventrally. Its ears have much less hair, but otherwise are the same color as the rest of the head. Male muntjacs have short antlers, about 10 cm (3.9 in) long, that protrude from long body hair-covered pedicels above the eyes. Females have tufts of fur and small bony knobs instead of antlers. Males also have elongated 2–4 cm (0.79–1.57 in) long, slightly curved upper canines, which can be used in male-male conflicts and inflict serious injury. The body length of muntjacs varies from 89 to 135 cm (35 to 53 in) with a 13 to 23 cm (5.1 to 9.1 in) long tail, and shoulder height ranging from 40 to 65 cm (16 to 26 in). Adults weigh between 13 and 35 kg (29 and 77 lb), with males being larger than females. Muntjacs are unique among the deer, having large, obvious facial (preorbital, in front of the eyes) scent glands used to mark territories or to attract females. Males have larger glands than females.

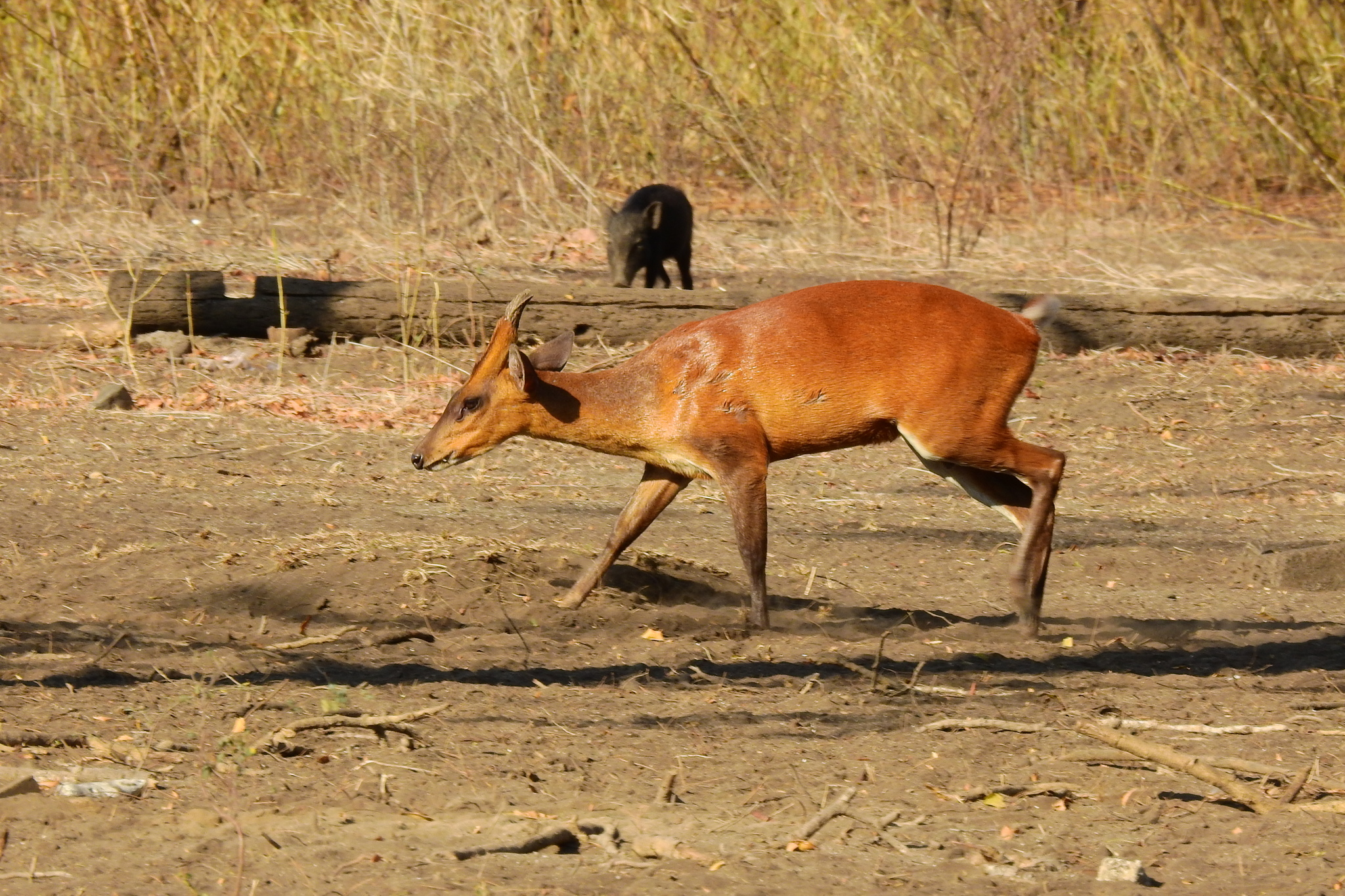
Southern red muntjac in Indonesia

== Distribution and habitat ==
The southern red muntjac (previously known as the common muntjac) is found in the Malay Peninsula, Sumatra, Java, Bali and Borneo. It is also assumed to be present in peninsular Thailand and southwestern Myanmar. It is locally extinct in Singapore.

This species is mostly associated with low-density forest habitats, but can also be found in heavily degraded forest and in areas of forest near plantations of coffee, cassava, rubber, sugarcane, coconut and teak. It is adaptable to areas altered by logging and appears to benefit from agricultural conversion of forest edges. In young acacia plantations (under 4 years old) in the Bintulu Division of Sarawak, East Malaysia, southern red muntjacs (along with other muntjac species) are some of the most commonly camera-trapped species. Footprints are commonly found in newly-planted areas and nearby remnant patches of forest and muntjacs have been seen browsing on young acacia shoots. In Danum Valley, Borneo, an area with minimal hunting, it has been observed to increase in population density following deforestation.

== Taxonomy ==
The southern red muntjac was formerly classified as Cervus muntjac. There were formerly 15 subspecies, included under the species in the third edition of Mammal Species of the World:

- M. m. annamensis, Indochina
- M. m. aureus, peninsular India
- M. m. bancanus, Belitung and Bangka Islands
- M. m. curvostylis, Thailand
- M. m. grandicornis, Burmese muntjac, Burma
- M. m. malabaricus, South India and Sri Lanka
- M. m. montanus, Sumatran or mountain muntjac, Sumatra
- M. m. muntjak, Javan muntjac, Java and south Sumatra
- M. m. nainggolani, Bali and Lombok Islands
- M. m. nigripes, black-footed or black-legged muntjac, Vietnam and Hainan Island
- M. m. peninsulae, Malaysia
- M. m. pleicharicus, South Borneo
- M. m. robinsoni, Bintan Island and Lingga Islands
- M. m. rubidus, north Borneo
- M. m. vaginalis, Burma to southwest China

Currently, two of these subspecies have since been elevated to species status: M. malabaricus as the Malabar red muntjak and M. vaginalis as the northern red muntjac.

The subspecies bancanus, montanus, muntjak, nainggolani, peninsulae, pleiharicus, robinsoni and rubidus remain subspecies of the southern red muntjac, while annamensis, aureus, curvostylis, grandicornis and nigripes have been reassigned as subspecies of the northern red muntjac.

== Ecology and behavior ==
Alarm calls

The Southern red muntjac is also called "barking deer" due to the bark-like sound that it makes as an alarm when danger is present. Other than during the rut and for the first six months after giving birth, the adult muntjac is a solitary animal. Adult males in particular are well spaced and marking grass and bushes with secretions from their preorbital glands appears to be involved in the acquisition and maintenance of territory.

=== Reproduction ===
The Southern red muntjac is suspected to be polygamous. Females become sexually mature during their first to second year of life, but without a specific breeding season. They are polyestrous, with each cycle lasting about 14 to 21 days and an estrus lasting for two days. The gestation period is 6–7 months and they usually bear one offspring at a time, but sometimes produce twins. Females usually give birth in dense growth so that they are hidden from the rest of the herd and predators. The young leaves its mother after about 6 months to establish its own territory. Males often fight between one another for possession of a harem of females. Adults exhibit relatively large home range overlap both intersexually and intrasexually, meaning that strict territorialism does not occur but some form of site-specific dominance exists.

== Evolution and genetics ==
Female M. m. vaginalis metaphase spread chromosomes

Paleontological evidence proves that Southern red muntjacs have been around since the late Pleistocene epoch at least 12,000 years ago. They are the oldest known extant members of the deer family, Cervidae. The earliest known deer-like creatures had horns instead of antlers, but the muntjac is the earliest known species to have antlers. The ancestor to muntjacs is the Dicrocerus elegans, which is the oldest known deer to have shed its antlers. Other fossils found that deer species experienced a split of the Cervinae from the Muntiacinae, the latter of which remained of similar morphology. Muntjacs of this time during the Miocene were smaller than their modern counterparts. Molecular data have suggested that Southern red muntjacs and Fea's muntjacs share a common ancestor, while giant muntjacs are more closely related to Reeve's muntjac. Although the muntjac deer has a long lineage, little has been studied in terms of their fossil record.

Between species, muntjacs have a wide variation in number of chromosomes; in fact, the southern red muntjac has the lowest recorded number of chromosomes of any mammal. Although females have a diploid number of 6 and males have a diploid number of seven, the species possesses a much higher cognitive ability than other muntjacs. In comparison, the similar Reeves's muntjac (M. reevesi) has a diploid number of 46 chromosomes.

== Threats ==
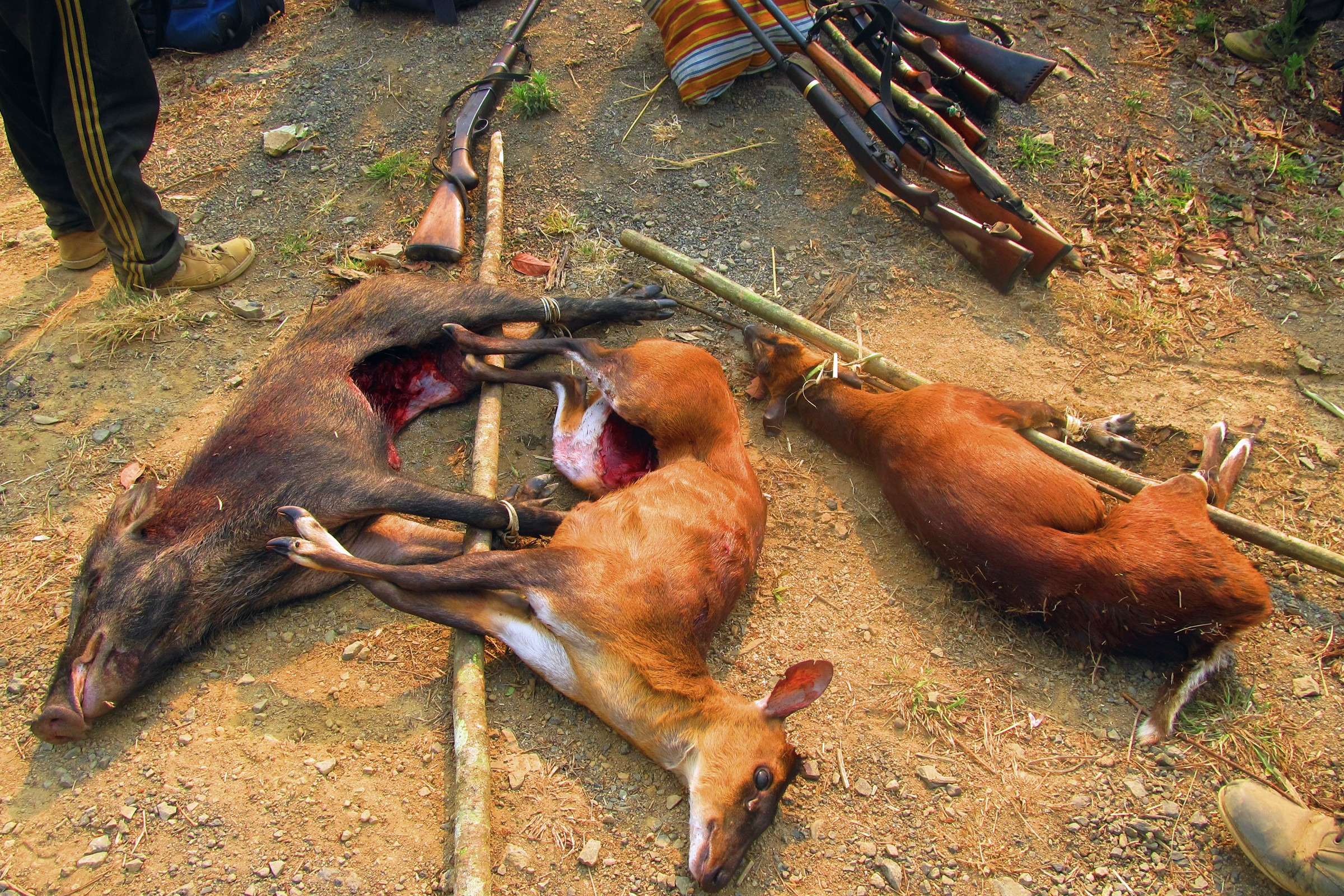
Two southern red muntjacs and a wild boar hunted by the Poumai Naga people in northern India

The southern red muntjac is hunted for sport, meat and skin around the outskirts of agricultural areas. In Thailand, it is considered a nuisance for damaging crops and ripping bark from trees.
