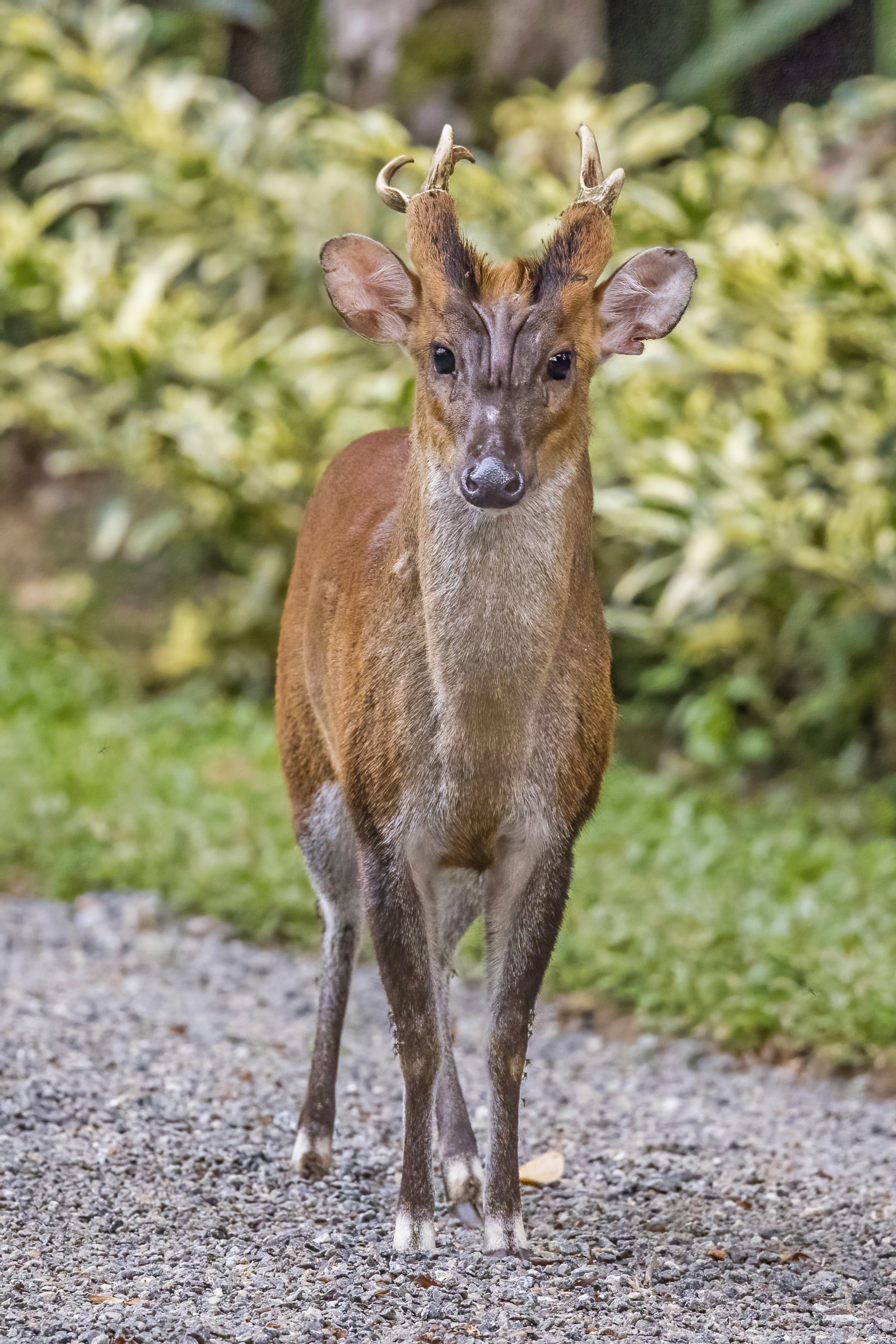

Scientific classification
- Kingdom: Animalia
- Phylum: Chordata
- Class: Mammalia
- Order: Artiodactyla
- Family: Cervidae
- Genus: Muntiacus
- Species: M. malabaricus

Binomial name
- Muntiacus malabaricus Lydekker, 1915

= Malabar red muntjak =

Species of deer

The Malabar red muntjak (Muntiacus malabaricus) is a muntjac deer species, endemic to India and Sri Lanka.
