= Palawan (island) =

Island in the Philippines

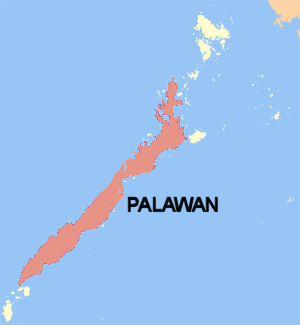
- Map with Palawan Island highlighted in red

- Location within Philippines

Geography
- Location: Southeast Asia
- Coordinates: 9°30′N 118°30′E
- Archipelago: Philippine Islands
- Adjacent to: South China Sea; Sulu Sea
- Area: 12,188.6 km^{2} (4,706.0 sq mi)
- Area rank: 64th
- Length: 425 km (264.1 mi)
- Width: 40 km (25 mi)
- Coastline: 1,354.1 km (841.4 mi)
- Highest elevation: 2,086 m (6844 ft)
- Highest point: Mount Mantalingajan

Administration
- Philippines
- Region: Mimaropa
- Province: Palawan
- Municipalities: List: Aborlan; Bataraza; Brooke's Point; Dumaran; El Nido; Narra; Puerto Princesa; Quezon; Rizal; Roxas; San Vicente; Sofronio Española; Taytay
- Capital and largest city: Puerto Princesa (pop. 316,384)

Demographics
- Population: 1,023,849 (2024)
- Pop. density: 72.7/km^{2} (188.3/sq mi)

Palawan (Spanish: Isla de La Paragua) is the largest island of the province of Palawan in the Philippines and fifth-largest by area and tenth-most populous island of the country, with a total population of 1,023,849 as of 2024 census. The northwest coast of the island is along the Palawan Passage in the eastern South China Sea, while the southeast coast forms part of the northern limit of the Sulu Sea. Much of the island remains traditional and is considered by some as under-developed. Abundant wildlife, jungle mountains, and some white sandy beaches attract many tourists, as well as international companies looking for development opportunities.

One city and 12 out of the 23 municipalities of the Province of Palawan are on this island. Iwahig Prison and Penal Farm, one of seven operating units of the Bureau of Corrections, is located on the island.

== Geography ==
The entire length of the island forms a mountain range, with a peak altitude of 2,086 meters (6,844 ft) at Mount Mantalingajan. Other significant peaks include Mount Gantung (1,788 meters (5,866 ft)) in Batazara and Victoria Peak (1,726 meters (5,663 ft)) in Narra. The outlying islands include Cagayancillo to the far east, Dumaran Island and the more distant Cuyo Archipelago are to the northeast, and Linapacan and Busuanga Island nearby in the north-northeast. The archipelago of Kalayaan Municipality is to the far west, while Balabac Municipality is south of the island's western edge.

=== Geology ===
The geology of Palawan is, in many ways, unlike other parts of the Philippines. The crust of northeast Palawan was derived from the southeast edge of the continental crust of China, part of the Eurasian Plate. It is the exposed portion of a microcontinent that drifted southward with the opening of the South China Sea, and forms the shallow waters north of Palawan in the Reed Bank-Dangerous Ground area of the southern South China Sea. Some of the oldest rocks in the Philippines are found in northeast Palawan (Permian-Carboniferous age). Southwest Palawan exposes primarily ophiolitic material (rocks derived from uplifted oceanic crust and mantle). This 34 Mya old (latest Eocene-earliest Oligocene) ophiolite appears to have been thrust upon the continental crust as well as the older, Cretaceous ophiolitic and sedimentary units. The transition from "oceanic" ophiolite in the southwest to "continental"-type rocks in the northeast occurs in the area of central Palawan around Ulugan Bay and the Sabang area, in the southern coasts of which are several exposures showing Palawan ophiolite having been thrust onto continent-derived clastic rocks ("Sabang thrust").

The Palawan Trough is an area of deeper water adjacent to the north coast of Palawan in the South China Sea. The Palawan Trough is thought to exist due to downbending of the continental crust due to the weight of the ophiolite thrust sheet.

Further north, around the Malampaya Sound area and up to the El Nido area, one finds older (Triassic-Jurassic) deep marine chert and limestone. The limestone forms spectacular karst terrain. These units are part of the microcontinent ("North Palawan Block") although they are deep marine rocks marginal to the continental crust. They were accreted to the Chinese continental crust in the Mesozoic at a time when an Andean-type subduction zone existed in southeast China.

Intruding these rocks in central Palawan (Cleopatra's Needle area) and northern Palawan (Mount Capoas or Kapoas area) are young granite bodies (true granite to granodiorite). The Kapoas intrusion is of Miocene age (13-15 million years old based on zircon and monazite U-Pb dating). In the Taytay area of northern Palawan, a young basaltic cinder cone is another manifestation of young magmatic activity. The granitic magmatism and basaltic magmatism are both expressions of what has been identified as a widespread post-South China Sea spreading magmatism that has affected many areas around the South China Sea.

Tectonically, Palawan with the Calamian Islands, is considered to be a north-east extension of the Sunda Plate, in collision with the Philippine Mobile Belt at Mindoro.

== Flora and fauna ==
Unlike most of the country, Palawan is biogeographically part of Sundaland, with a fauna and flora related to those in Borneo.

=== Prehistory ===
Two articulated phalanx bones of a tiger, besides another phalanx piece, were found amidst an assemblage of other animal bones and stone tools in Ille Cave near the village of New Ibajay. The other animal fossils were ascribed to macaques, deer, bearded pigs, small mammals, lizards, snakes and turtles. From the stone tools, besides the evidence for cuts on the bones, and the use of fire, it would appear that early humans had accumulated the bones. Additionally, the condition of the tiger subfossils, dated to approximately 12,000 to 9,000 years ago, differed from other fossils in the assemblage, dated to the Upper Paleolithic. The tiger subfossils showed longitudinal fracture of the cortical bone due to weathering, which suggests that they had post-mortem been exposed to light and air. Tiger parts were commonly used as amulets in South and Southeast Asia, so it may be that the tiger parts were imported from elsewhere, as is the case with tiger canine teeth, which were found in Ambangan sites dating to the 10th to 12th centuries in Butuan, Mindanao. On the other hand, the proximity of Borneo and Palawan also makes it likely that the tiger had colonized Palawan from Borneo before the Early Holocene.

Using the work of Von den Driesch, all chosen anatomical features of appendicular elements' anatomical features which were chosen, besides molars, were measured to distinguish between taxa that had close relationships, and see morphometric changes over ages, though not for pigs or deer. For the latter two, cranial and mandibular elements, besides teeth of deer from Ille Cave were compared with samples of the Philippine brown deer (Cervus mariannus), Calamian hog deer (Axis calamianensis), and Visayan spotted deer (Cervus alfredi), and thus two taxa of deer have been identified from the fossils: Axis and Cervus. Remains of pigs were compared with the Eurasian (Sus scrofa) and Palawanese wild boar (Sus ahoenobarbus). It is known that the Eurasian wild boar was imported as a domesticate to the islands from Mainland Southeast Asia to the islands during the Terminal Holocene.

Throughout deposits of the Terminal Pleistocene and early Holocene and Terminal Pleistocene at Ille Cave, elements of deer skeletons are regular, gradually becoming less before vanishing in the Terminal Holocene. One 'large' and one 'small' taxon can be easily differentiated by the significant change in size observed in the postcranial elements and dentition. From comparisons of the mesial-distal and labio-lingual measurements of individual fossil teeth and mandibular toothrows with those of surviving deer taxa in the Philippines and other Southeast Asian islands, it appears that the Calamian hog deer is most plausible candidate for the small taxon. The hog deer exists in forest edges and open grassland habitats on the islands of Culion and Busuanga, which during the Pleistocene were part of the landmass of Greater Palawan, but not on Palawan itself nowadays. As for the 'large' taxon of deer found in the Palawan fossils, the Philippine brown deer from Luzon appears to be closely matched to them, from dental biometric comparisons which are similar between the latter and extant members of the genus Cervus or Rusa, particularly the Philippine brown deer (C. mariannus) and spotted deer (C. alfredi). However, the Philippine brown deer shows significant variation across its range, with populations on Mindanao Island being smaller than those of Luzon. Thus, it is possible that the overlap between the Luzon brown deer and the archaeological material is coincidental, and that the fossils could belonged to another species of Cervus that had occurred in Palawan, with the taxonomic classification being unresolved. The Philippine brown deer from Luzon appears to be closely matched to the 'large' taxon of deer found in the Palawan fossils, from dental biometric comparisons which are similar between the latter and extant members of the genus Cervus or Rusa, particularly the Philippine brown deer (C. mariannus) and spotted deer (C. alfredi). However, the Philippine brown deer shows significant variation across its range, with populations on Mindanao Island being smaller than those of Luzon. Thus, it is possible that the overlap between the Luzon brown deer and the archaeological material is coincidental, and that the fossils could belonged to another species of Cervus that had occurred in Palawan, with the taxonomic classification being unresolved. Otherwise, members of the genus Cervus are no longer seen in the region of Palawan.

== History ==
The 1818 Spanish census showed, that when Palawan was then called the "Isla de Paragua" and was under the jurisdiction of the Calamianes islands to the north, the census recorded Palawan island to have had 4,486 native families and 29 Spanish-Filipino families.

In April 2013, a fishing vessel loaded with illegally poached animals ran aground on a coral atoll off the coast of Palawan Island.

In May 2014, Armed Forces of the Philippines Chief-of-Staff General Emmanuel T. Bautista commented that Oyster Bay may be developed into a naval base with United States Navy support.

== Culture ==
=== Language ===
More than 50 percent of Palawan residents speak Tagalog. Languages native to the island are Cuyonon (26.27%) and Palawano (4.0%). Kinaray-a is also present in Palawan, spoken by 19 percent of inhabitants. When the south of Palawan was part of the Sultanate of Sulu, Tausūg was the lingua franca of minority Islamized ethnic groups, i.e., the Molbog, Muslim Palaw'an, as well as migrant Tausūg and itinerant Sama-Bajau. Many local Muslims and barter traders today can also speak Sabah Malay. By the 19th century, Tausūg was superseded as a lingua franca by Cuyonon, which was also a common tongue for many of Palawan's native peoples including the Agutaynon, Cagayanen, Tagbanwa, Palawan, among others.

The mass immigration to Palawan by various groups of people from Southern Tagalog, the Ilocandia, Central Luzon, and Panay eventually brought in their own languages, with the number of Cuyonon speakers plummeting in the 1990s and 2000s as Tagalog became widespread once the province was administratively placed in the Southern Tagalog region. The Batangas dialect of Tagalog is common due to Palawan's geographical proximity to Batangas and Mindoro.

Since the 1970s, the Muslim Moro people in Mindanao, Philippines have been involved in a conflict with the government. Religious and political conflicts not only caused deaths but also forced people to migrate from Mindanao, pushing some of them to move to Palawan. In their place of migration in Palawan, they maintained their language and Islamic identity from 1970 onwards. Adding to the linguistic diversity of Palawan, most of these migrants are Maguindanao, Maranao, and Iranun speakers.

English is spoken by a majority of the younger (age 20–39) population in Puerto Princesa, and by a minority in every other area of the province.

== Gallery ==
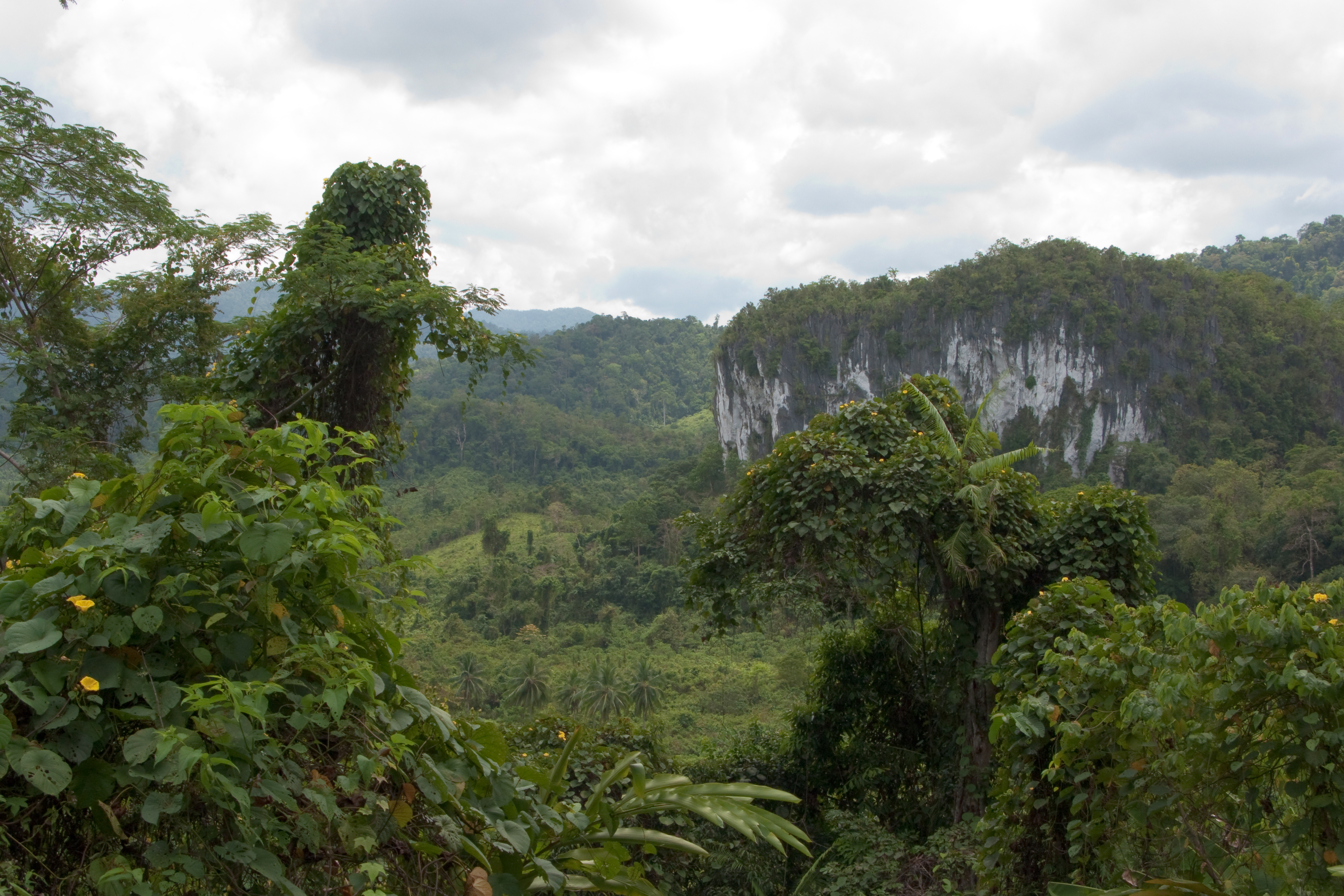
Mixed tropical forest, Puerto Princesa Subterranean River National Park

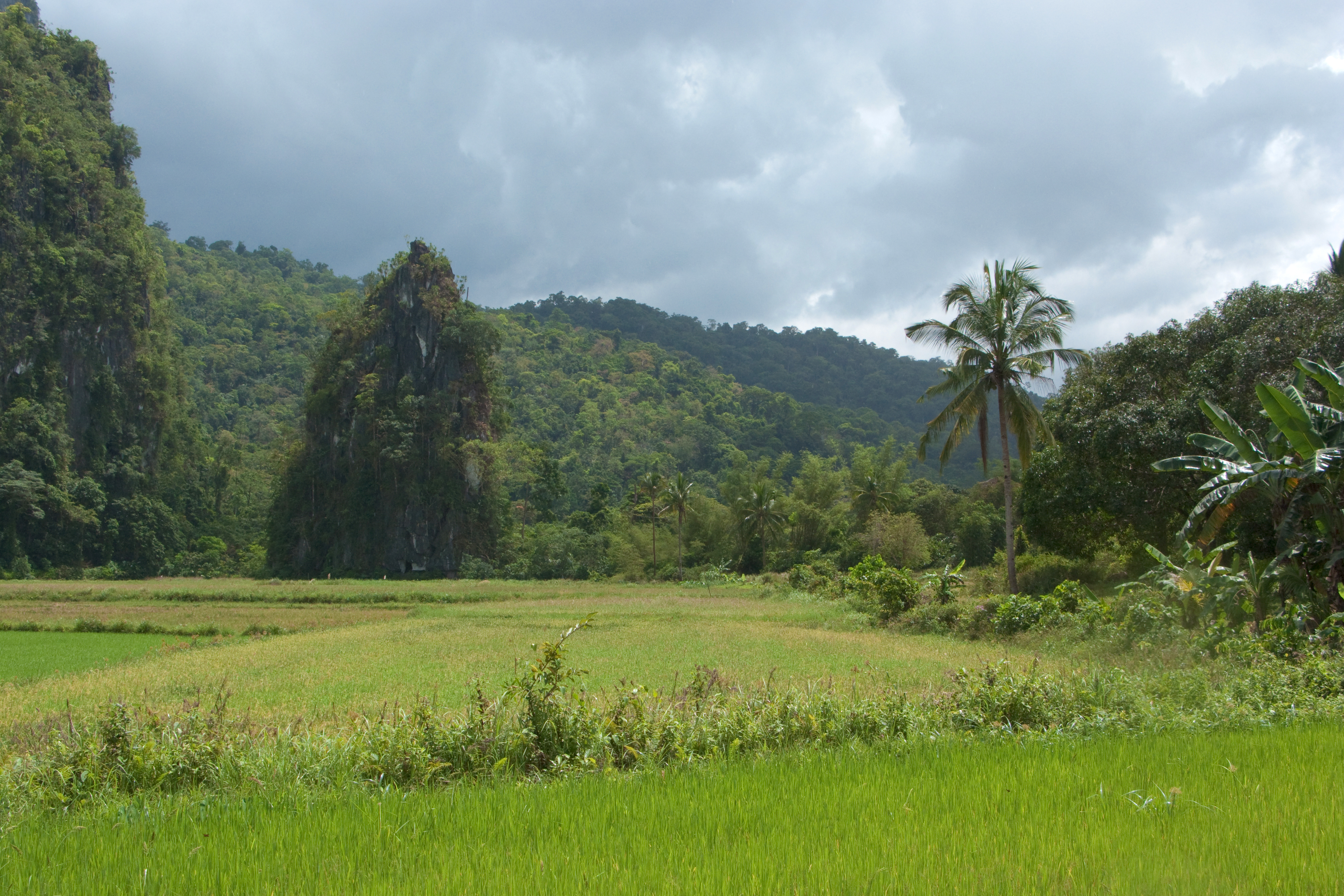
Limestone rock formations, Puerto Princesa Subterranean Park

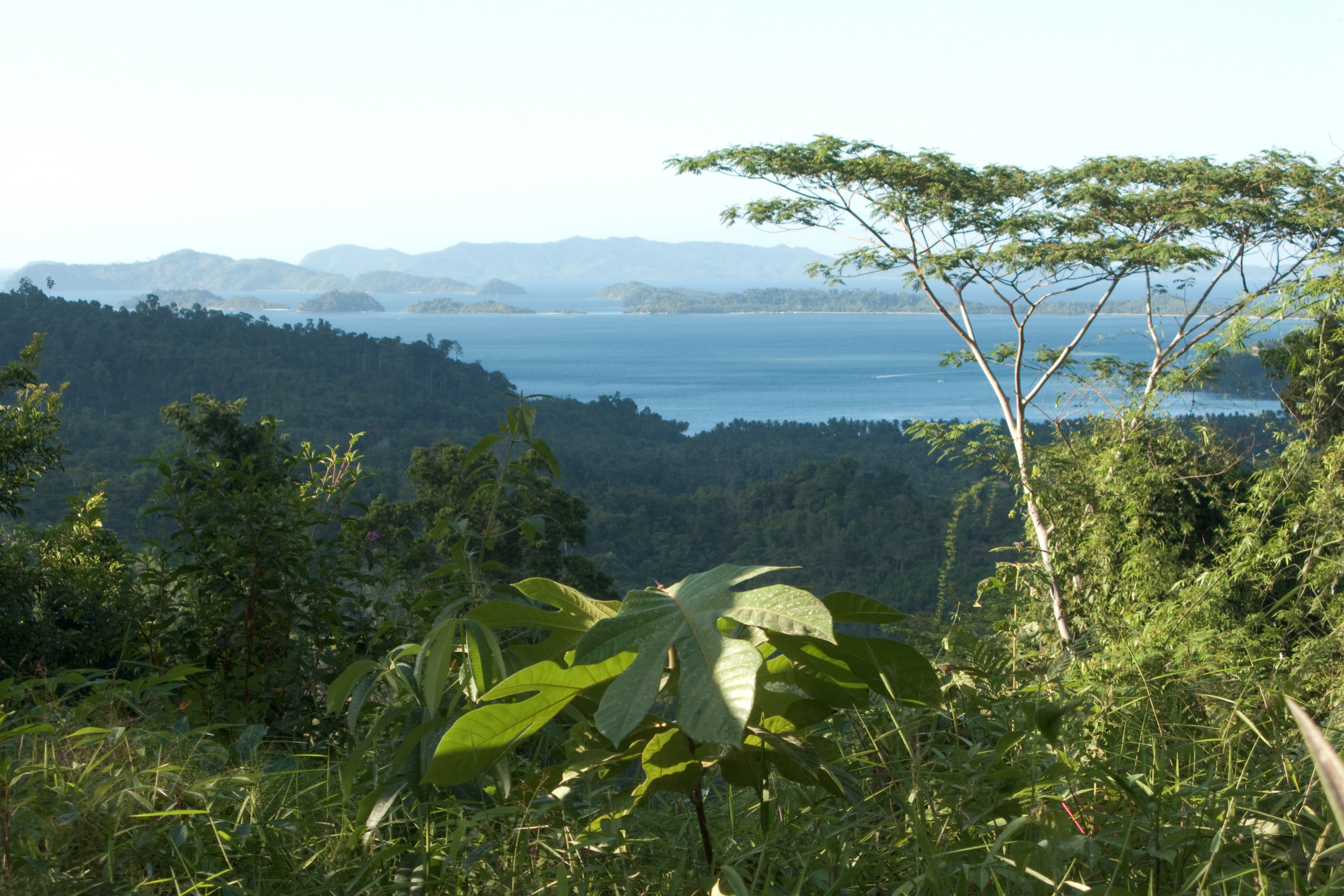
View of the northwest coast of Palawan

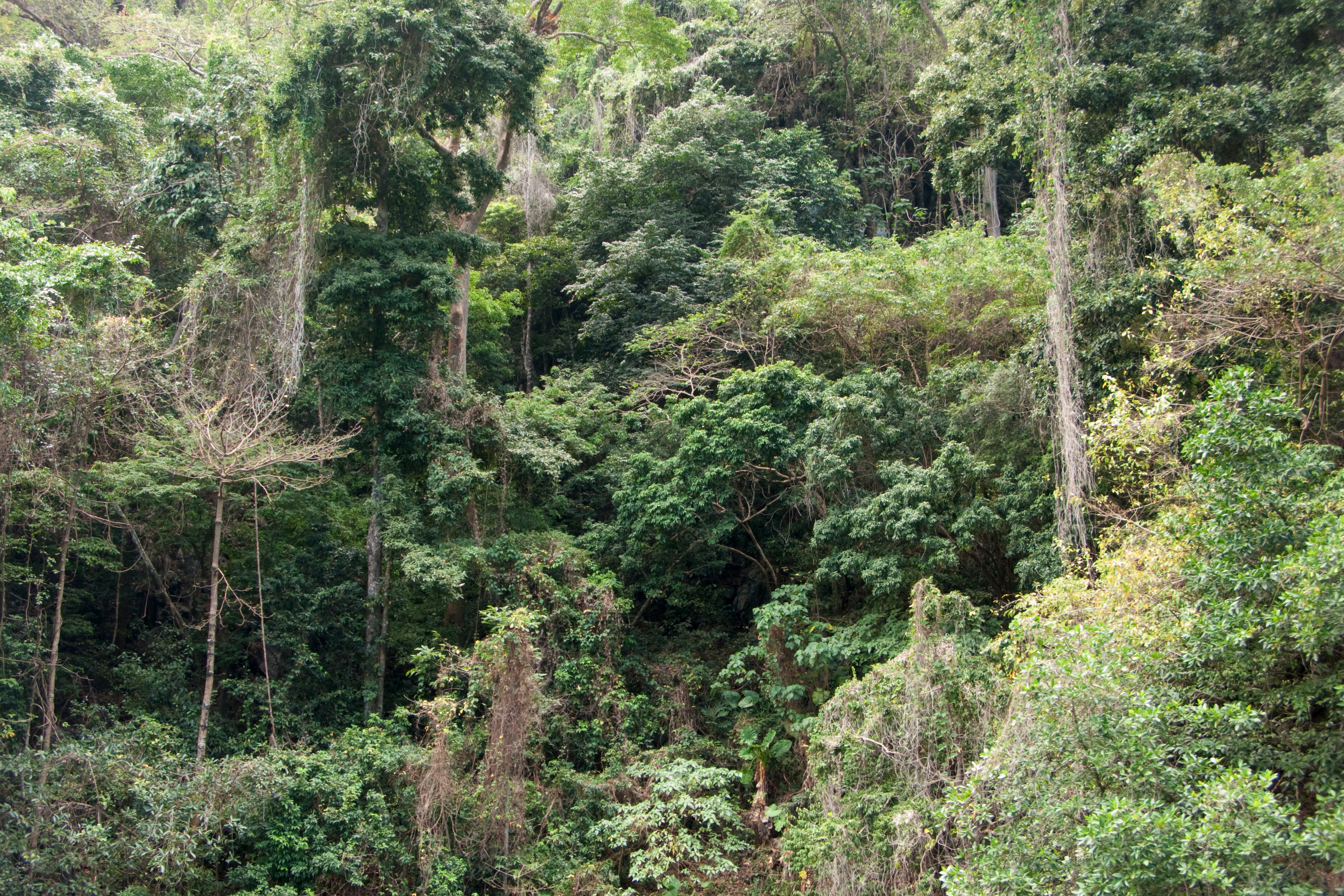
Limestone forest in Bacuit Bay

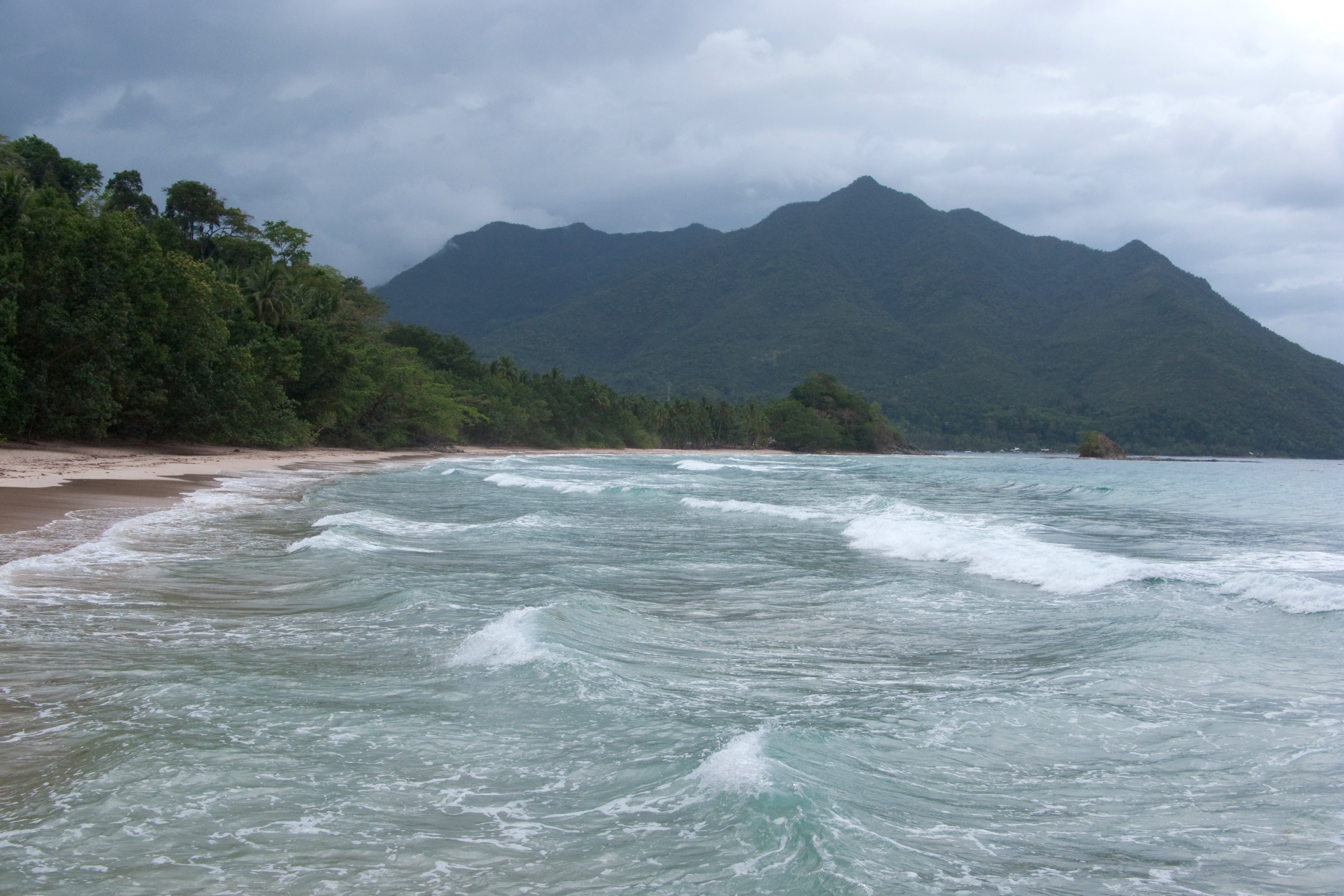
Sabang on the west coast of Palawan

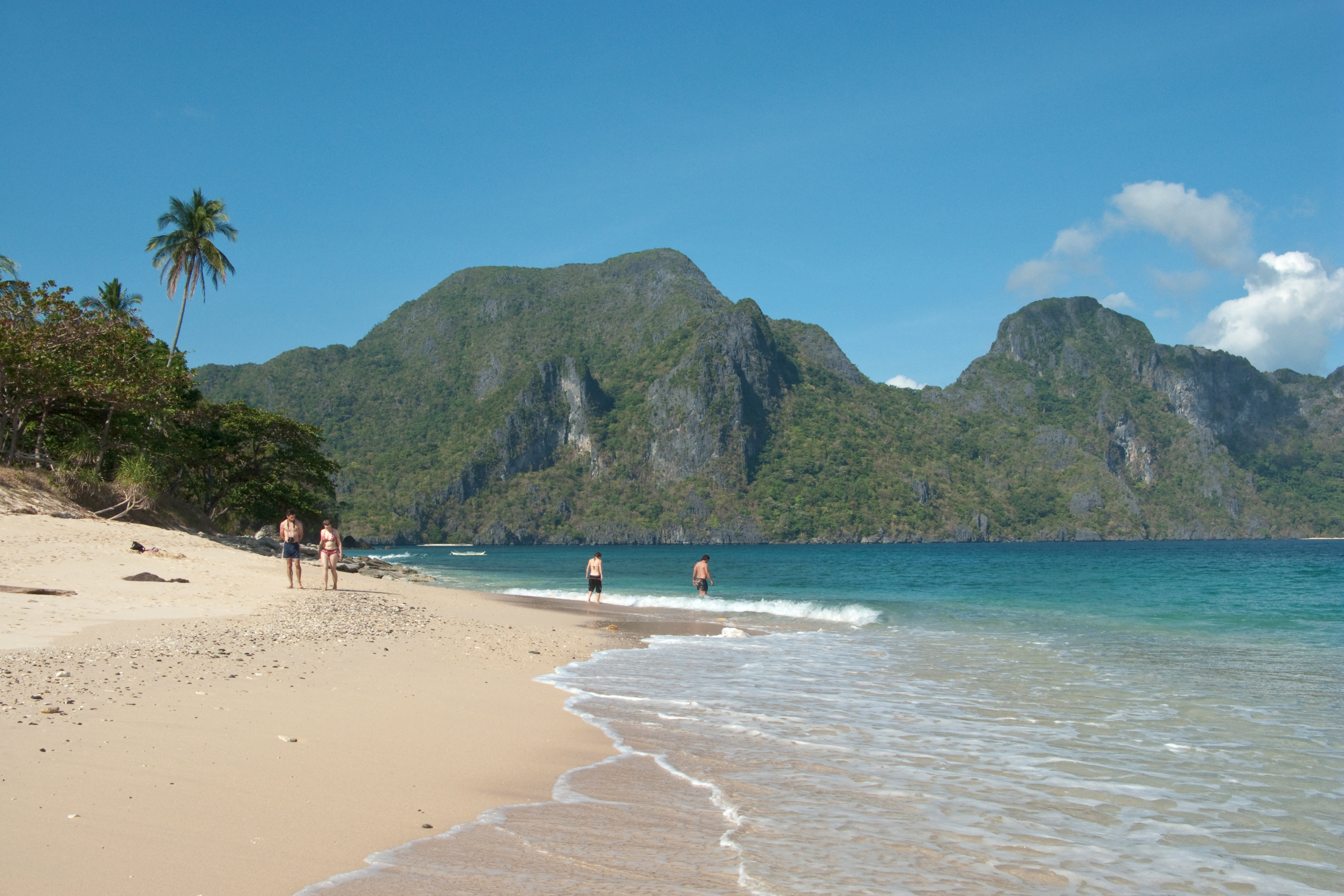
El Nido Bay

== Bibliography ==
- Hogan, C. Michael (2011). Saundry, P.; Cleveland, C. J. (eds.). Sulu Sea. Washington, D.C., USA: Encyclopedia of Earth.

== See also ==
- Dangerous Ground
- Puerto Princesa Subterranean River National Park
- Naval Base Puerto Princesa
