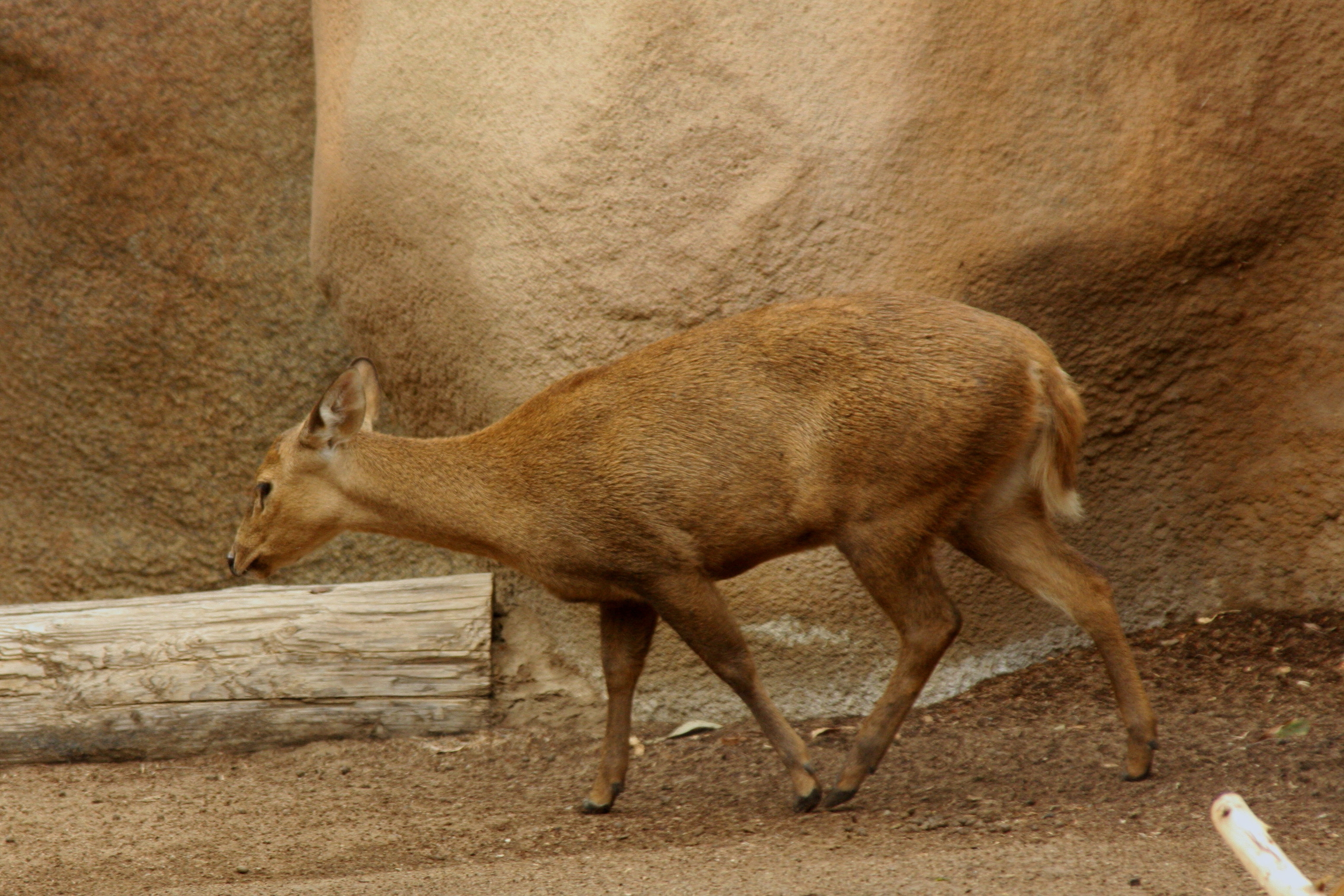
- In the San Diego Zoo, California

Conservation status
- Endangered (IUCN 3.1)
- CITES Appendix I

Scientific classification
- Kingdom: Animalia
- Phylum: Chordata
- Class: Mammalia
- Order: Artiodactyla
- Family: Cervidae
- Genus: Axis
- Species: A. calamianensis

Binomial name
- Axis calamianensis (Heude, 1888)
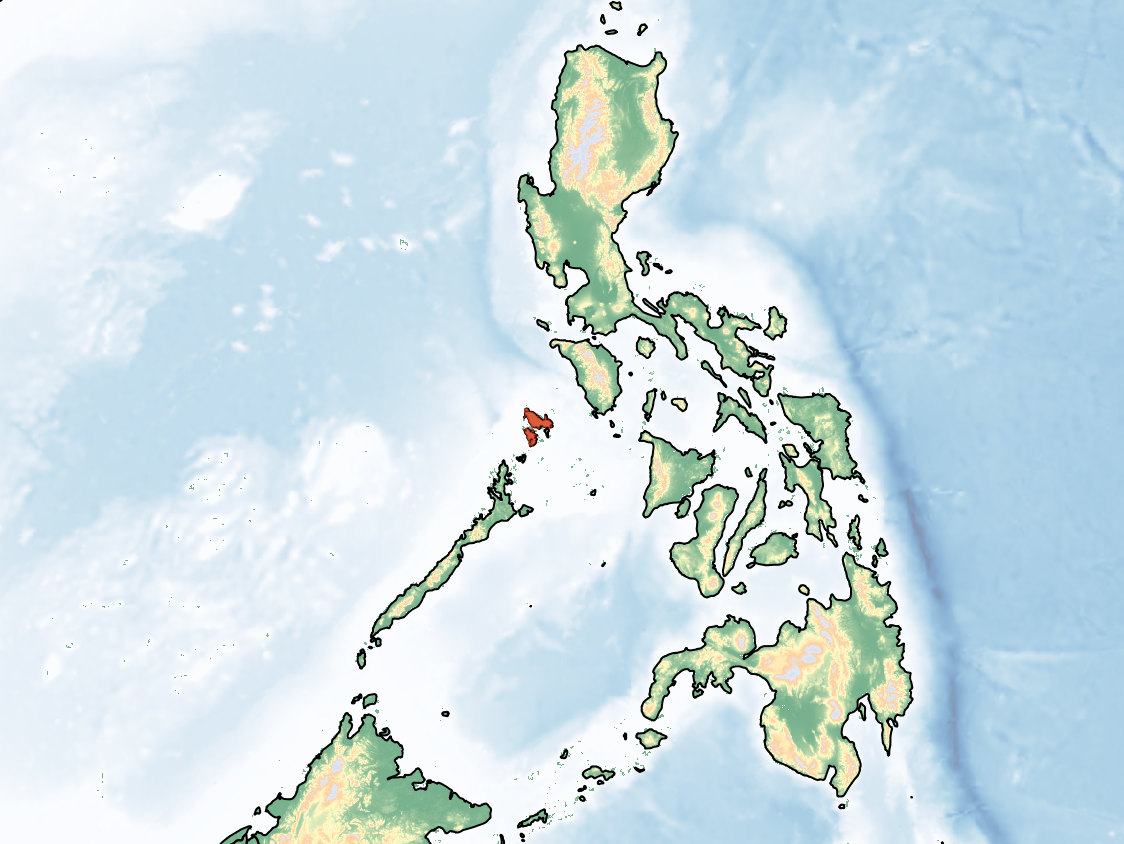

Synonyms
- Hyelaphus calamianensis (Heude, 1888); Axis culionensis (D.G. Elliot, 1897)

= Calamian deer =

Species of deer

The Calamian deer (Axis calamianensis), also known as Calamian hog deer, is an endangered species of deer found only in the Calamian Islands of Palawan province in the Philippines. It is one of three species of deer native to the Philippines, the other being the Philippine sambar (Rusa marianna) and the Visayan spotted deer (Rusa alfredi).

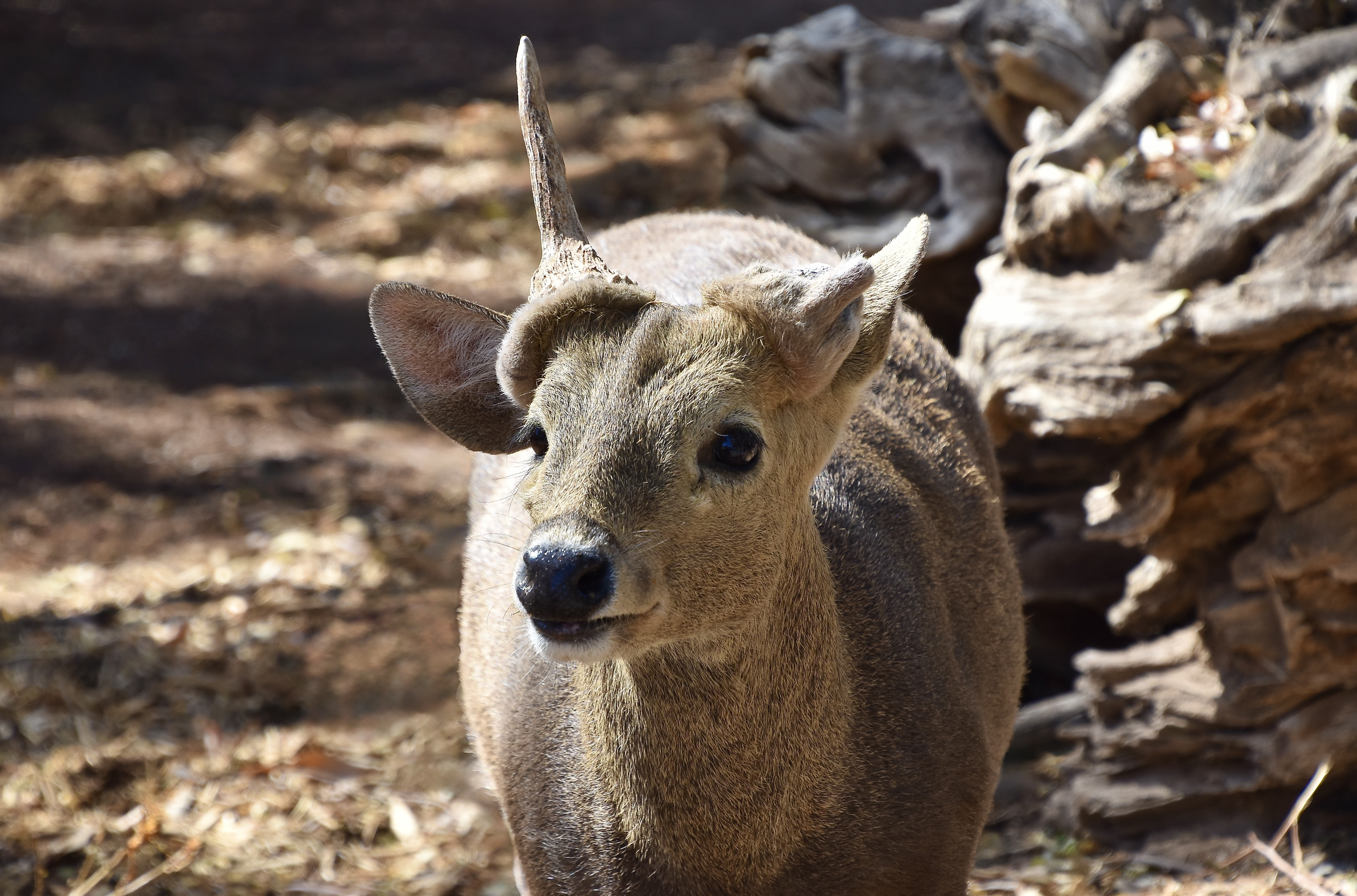
Calamian deer mid-antler shed at Phoenix Zoo.

== Taxonomy ==
It is considered by some taxonomists to be in the genus Hyelaphus; however, in 2021, the American Society of Mammalogists placed it in the genus Axis, a position the IUCN also uses.

== Behaviour and ecology ==
It is known as the "hog deer" because when it is fleeing from danger, it dashes through underbrush with its head down like a hog instead of jumping over barriers like other deer. These animals are crepuscular, meaning that they are active at sunrise and twilight. They rest during the warmer part of the day and then come out from the undergrowth to forage. Mainly solitary, they sometimes form small herds if left undisturbed. As with other deer species, Calamian deer are ruminants, meaning that they have four stomach chambers and chew cud. A soft, high-pitched, nasal call is their main vocalization. Their diet consist of shoots, twigs, and leaves.

== Characteristics ==
A typical height for males of 60–65 cm (24–26 in) has been reported. Weight can vary usually from 79 to 110 pounds. Males have three-tined antlers. Their fawns are not spotted at birth, which separates them from the best known western population of the Indian hog deer (A. porcinus). There are few natural predators except for birds of prey and pythons such as reticulated pythons.

== Fossil record ==
Fossils were found at Ille Cave near the village of New Ibajay in Palawan. They were ascribed to tigers, deer, macaques, bearded pigs, small mammals, lizards, snakes and turtles. From the stone tools, besides the evidence for cuts on the bones, and the use of fire, it would appear that early humans had accumulated the bones.

Using the work of Von den Driesch, all chosen anatomical features of appendicular elements' anatomical features which were chosen, besides molars, were measured to distinguish between taxa that had close relationships, and see morphometric changes over ages, though not for pigs or deer. For the latter two, cranial and mandibular elements, besides teeth of deer from Ille Cave were compared with samples of the Calamian hog deer, Philippine brown deer, and Visayan spotted deer, and thus two taxa of deer have been identified from the fossils: Axis and Cervus. Throughout deposits of the Terminal Pleistocene and early Holocene and Terminal Pleistocene at Ille Cave, elements of deer skeletons are regular, gradually becoming less before vanishing in the Terminal Holocene. One 'large' and one 'small' taxon can be easily differentiated by the significant change in size observed in the postcranial elements and dentition. From comparisons of the mesial-distal and labio-lingual measurements of individual fossil teeth and mandibular toothrows with those of surviving deer taxa in the Philippines and other Southeast Asian islands, it appears that the Calamian hog deer is most plausible candidate for the small taxon. The hog deer exists in forest edges and open grassland habitats on the islands of Culion and Busuanga, which during the Pleistocene were part of the landmass of Greater Palawan, but not on Palawan itself nowadays.

== See also ==
- Bawean deer (A. kuhlii)
