= Begonia woodii =

Scientific classification
- Kingdom: Plantae
- Clade: Tracheophytes
- Clade: Angiosperms
- Clade: Eudicots
- Clade: Rosids
- Order: Cucurbitales
- Family: Begoniaceae
- Genus: Begonia
- Species: B. woodii

Binomial name
- Begonia woodii Merr., 1925

Species of flowering plant

Begonia woodii is a species of flowering plant in the family Begoniaceae, endemic to the island province of Palawan in the Philippines. It is a rhizomatous geophyte, that inhabits crevices in dense forest. It was first described in 1925 by Elmer Drew Merrill. The species is considered Vulnerable by the country's Department of Environment and Natural Resources.

== Description ==
A small but glabrous herb. Stems typically short, about 1.5 cm (0.6 in) long. Leaves are usually solitary, green in color, almost obliquely ovate in shape, 3–6 cm (1.2–2.4 in) in length by 2.5–5 cm (1.0–2.0 in) width, the leaf base is cordate, the apical portion is acute to somewhat acuminate, margins are irregularly toothed to toothed-crenate. Staminate flowers are pink in color, about 1 cm (0.4 in) in diameter, with approximately 20 anthers. Capsules are 3-winged, measuring 8 to 10 mm wide including the wings.

== Etymology ==
The species is named after Governor-General Leonard Wood who provided Merrill with an opportunity to carry out botanical fieldworks in Malampaya Bay.

== Distribution ==
The type of the species was collected in Malampaya Bay in Palawan, Philippines by Merrill in August 1922. There was also a photographic record of the species from Lagen Island.

== Habitat and ecology ==
The species was known to inhabit crevices in shaded cliffs, among the dense forest at an altitude of about 50 meters (160 ft) above sea level.
