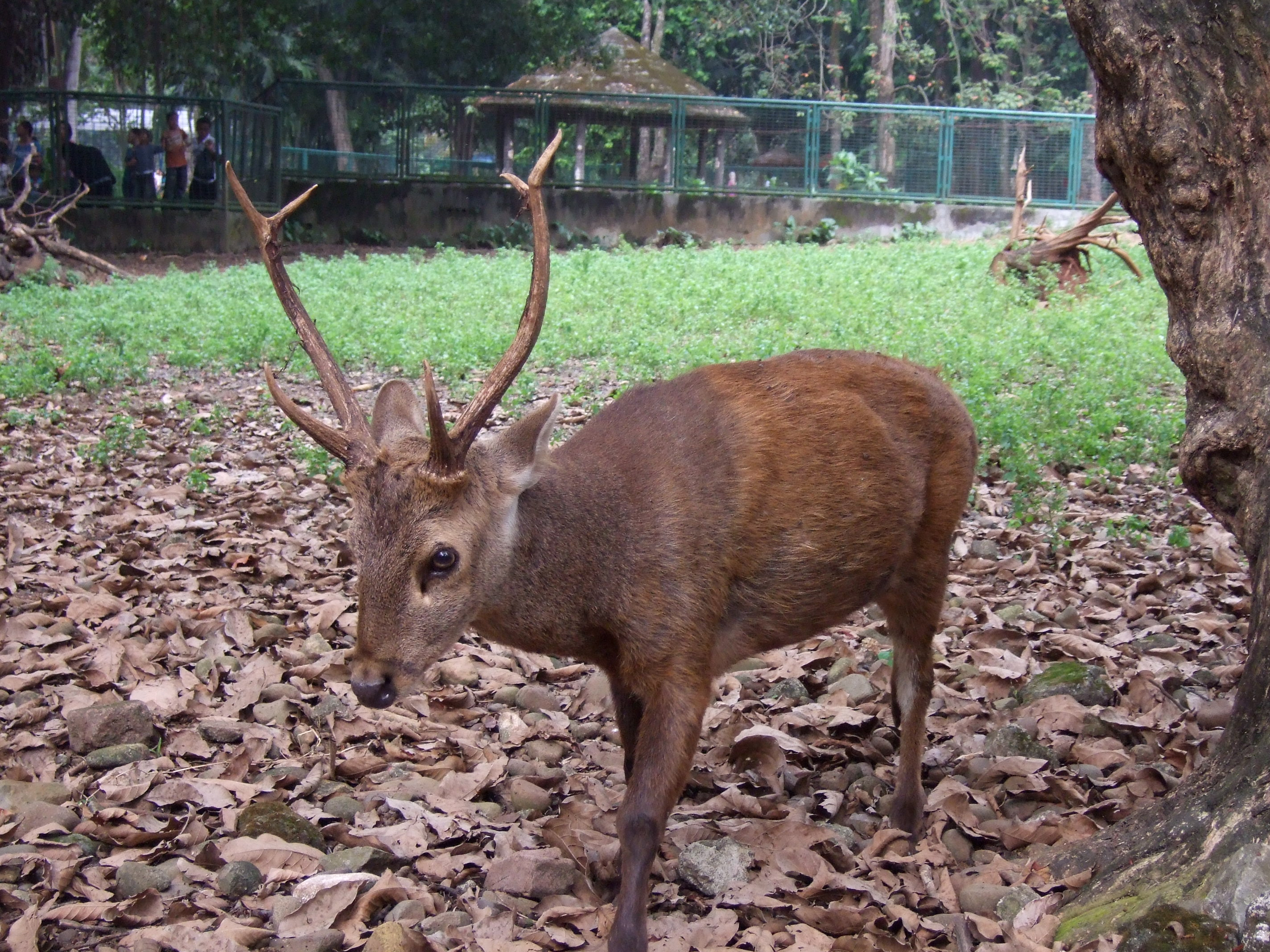
- Adult male at the Ragunan Zoo, Jakarta

Conservation status
- Critically Endangered (IUCN 3.1)
- CITES Appendix I

Scientific classification
- Kingdom: Animalia
- Phylum: Chordata
- Class: Mammalia
- Order: Artiodactyla
- Family: Cervidae
- Genus: Axis
- Species: A. kuhlii

Binomial name
- Axis kuhlii (Temminck, 1836)
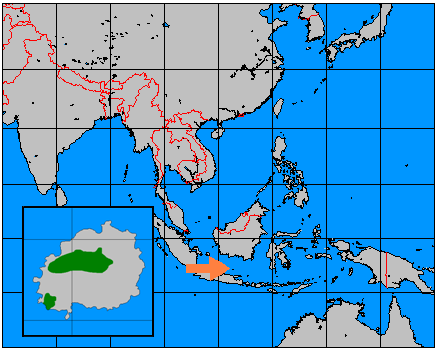
- Orange arrow points to Bawean Island. Green on inserted map highlights approximate range of Bawean deer on the island.

Synonyms
- Hyelaphus kuhlii (Müller, 1840)

= Bawean deer =

Species of deer

The Bawean deer (Axis kuhlii), also known as Kuhl's hog deer or Bawean hog deer, is a highly threatened species of deer endemic to the island of Bawean in Indonesia. Due to ongoing habitat loss, small population size and limited range, the Bawean deer is evaluated as critically endangered on the IUCN Red List of Threatened Species. It is listed on Appendix I of CITES. It has few natural enemies except for birds of prey and pythons such as reticulated pythons.

== Description ==
A typical height for males of 60–70 cm (24–28 in) has been reported. Males have three-tined antlers. Their fawns are spotted at birth, which separates them from the best known western population of the related Indian hog deer (Axis porcinus). Their pelage is short, smooth, and soft, and generally a light brown in color. There are few distinctive yellow markings which are limited to the head and neck. There is also a light throat patch or 'bib' and a whitish eye-ring. Infants have white spots on their backs when younger.

== Taxonomy ==
The Bawean deer was sometimes included in the same species as the Indian hog deer (Axis porcinus), but is now mostly considered a different species. The most recent analyses indicate that these two species, together with Axis calamianensis, may constitute a different genus distinct from Axis and Hyelaphus. It is considered by some taxonomists to be in the genus Hyelaphus; however, in 2021, the American Society of Mammalogists placed it in the genus Axis, which the IUCN has also done.

== Life history ==
They live in woodlands and upland forests with dense undergrowth which is used for shelter, providing a refuge in which the deer sleep and rest during the day. They live in small groups of four or five deer, usually one female, her infant, and two males. They are herbivores and consume grasses, herbs, leaves, twigs, corn crops, and leaves of the cassava plant. Females will have one offspring at a time per year. The gestation period is 225–230 days, and the majority of births occur in February to June.

Males can be very aggressive towards other males that approach their small families, and will spray other males and predators in the face with their glandular secretions. They also mark their territories with this as well. When fleeing, the Bawean deer carries its head low and runs with a trotting gait. Their spine also curves high towards the rear when fleeing from predators. When fleeing from predators the males will run in front and the infant, if there is one, will be behind the males. The female will run in the back. This is effective in order to protect the infant from predators.

== Conservation efforts ==
The World Wildlife Fund has noted that some of the factors for the decline of this species and others in Indonesia include climate changes: warming ocean temperatures, rising sea levels, prolonged droughts, and increased flooding. The Indonesian government passed a bill in 1977 protecting the endangered Bawean deer, and consequently their numbers have risen. With the help of this law their reproductive success has gone up over the years. The International Union for Conservation of Nature (IUCN) has listed the Kuhl's hog deer as being critically endangered, meaning that the species is facing an extremely high risk of extinction in the wild.
