= Malampaya Sound =

- Location within the Philippines Malampaya Sound (Philippines)

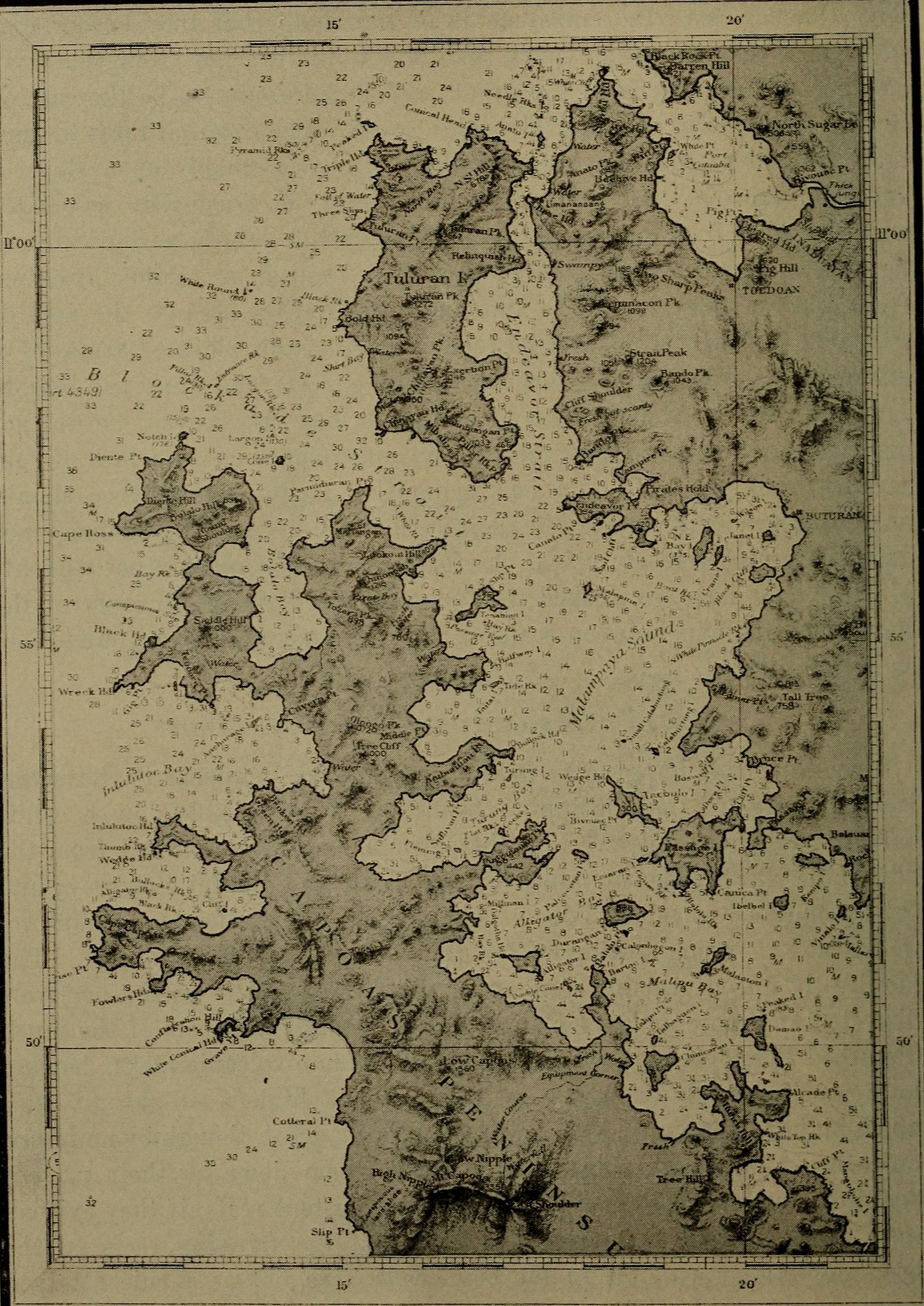
- 1918 Coast Survey chart of Malampaya Sound
- Location: Palawan, Philippines
- Coordinates: 10°50′36.96″N 119°22′13.44″E
- Settlements: Taytay

Malampaya Sound is a protected inlet of the West Philippine Sea on the northwestern coast of Palawan Island in western Philippines. It is a geographic sound consisting of a complex of sheltered bays, coves, estuaries and islands separated from the sea to the west by the Copoas Peninsula. The sound is within the municipality of Taytay and is an important feature for the ecology and economy of the province of Palawan. It is considered one of the finest natural harbors in the Philippines and one of Palawan's richest fishing grounds.

The entire embayment and its surrounding landscape was declared a marine protected area in 2000 known as the Malampaya Sound Protected Landscape and Seascape. It covers 200,115 hectares (494,490 acres) of both aquatic and terrestrial environment with diverse ecosystems consisting of mangroves, coral reefs and seagrass beds, and a variety flora and fauna endemic to Palawan. The sound is the only known habitat of Irrawaddy dolphins in the Philippines.

== Description ==
Malampaya Sound is about 34 kilometres (21 mi) long in a southeasterly direction with breadths of between 3.2 and 7 kilometres (2.0 and 4.3 mi). It is separated into the shallow brackish "inner sound" and deep saltwater "outer sound", with the division being a group of 13 small islands, the largest being Passage Island, located in the narrow middle portion. The sound is partially protected from the sea by Tuluran Island (also known as Tumbod), a barrier island that is 6.4 kilometres (4.0 mi) long and 3.2 kilometres (2.0 mi) wide at its widest point, which divides its entrance into two channels: the 1.1-kilometre (0.68 mi) wide Blockade Strait to the west, and the narrow 0.2-kilometre (0.12 mi) Endeavor Strait to the east.

The sound forms the coast of eighteen barangays of Taytay municipality, with Taytay Poblacion and Pancol being the largest situated on the Inner Sound. It is indented by several bays and coves and with a surrounding landscape characterized by moderately rolling hills. The sound is fed by several rivers supplying fresh water inflow namely, the Abongan, Alacalian, Bato and Pinagupitan rivers. 8 kilometres (5.0 mi) north of its entrance is Custodio Point which forms the western border of Bacuit Bay in the municipality of El Nido, itself a managed resource protected area. The Copoas Peninsula, named after its highest peak, Mount Copoas at 1,013 metres (3,323 ft) above sea level, is shared with four barangays of the municipality of San Vicente on its southern side.

The Malampaya marine protected area is located some 217 kilometres (135 mi) north of Palawan's provincial capital, Puerto Princesa. It is also the site of several Tagbanua settlements whose main means of livelihood are fishing and farming, particularly in the areas of Minapla, New Guinlo, Binga, Alimanguan, Pancol and Liminagcong.

== Ecology ==
Malampaya Sound's waters, coral reefs, seagrass beds, mangrove coastlines and surrounding lowland forests provide habitat for a wide variety of wildlife. More than 156 fish species are found in its waters including commercially valuable fish such as mackerel, anchovy, crevalle, sea catfish, snapper, frigate tuna, rabbit fish and grouper. Crabs and stingray are also abundant in the sound and is also visited by dugongs and marine turtles like green sea turtles and hawksbill sea turtles. The sound is also home to three species of dolphins: the Irrawaddy dolphin found in the Inner Sound, the bottle-nosed dolphin in the Outer Sound, and Risso's dolphin found at Minapla Bay.

The surrounding forested landscape consists of primarily dipterocarp trees such as narra, ipil, apitong, dao, kamagong and mancono. It is inhabited by several animal species unique to Palawan, including the Palawan binturong, Palawan pangolin, Palawan stink badger, Palawan treeshrew and Palawan porcupine. A number of endemic bird species are also found in the protected area like the Palawan peacock-pheasant, Palawan hornbill, Tabon scrubfowl, talking myna and Philippine cockatoo. Its forest also hosts the Philippine long-tailed macaque, Asian palm civet and the critically endangered Philippine forest turtle.
