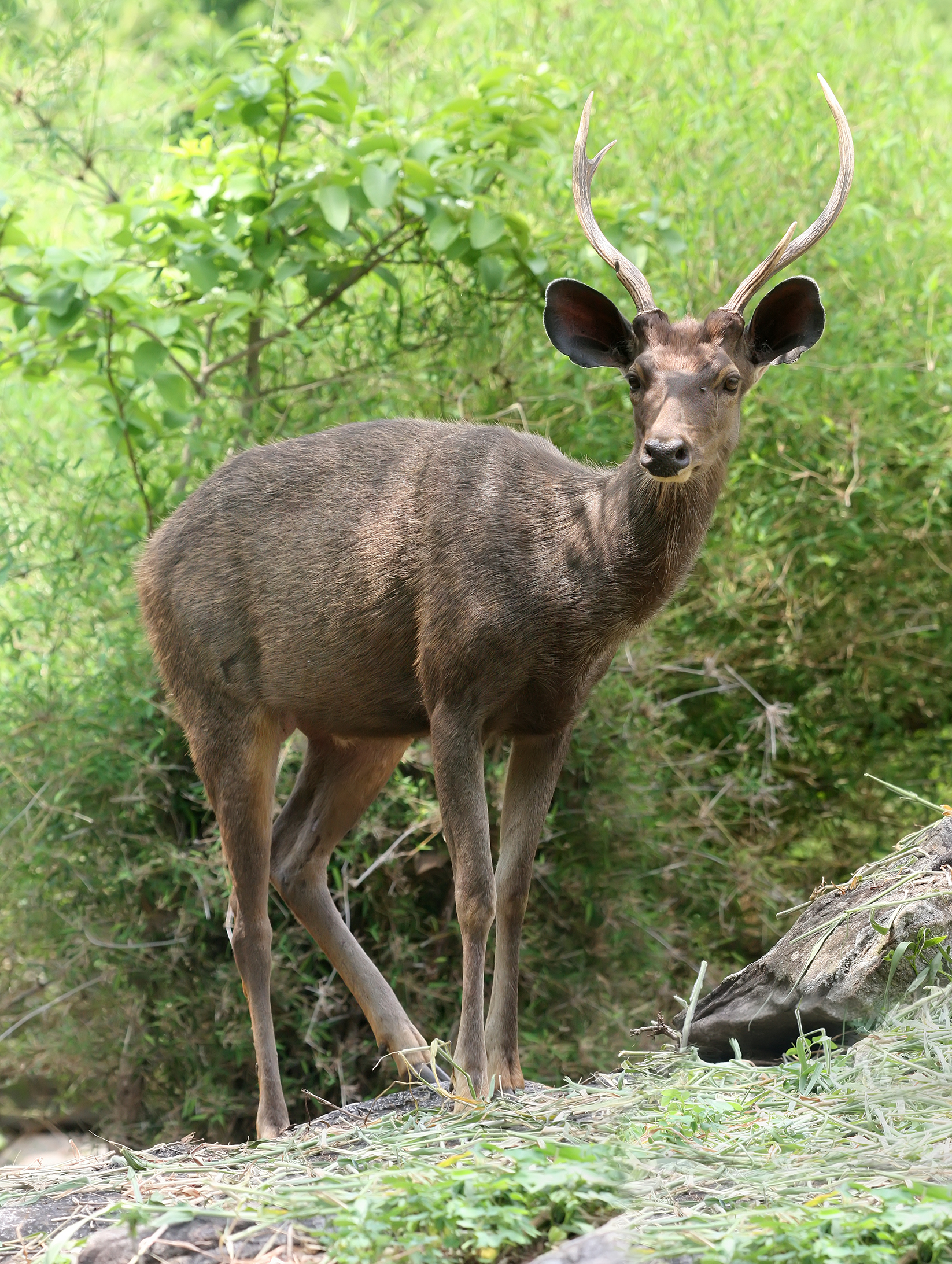
- Sambar

Scientific classification
- Kingdom: Animalia
- Phylum: Chordata
- Class: Mammalia
- Order: Artiodactyla
- Family: Cervidae
- Tribe: Cervini
- Genus: Rusa; C. H. Smith, 1827

Type species
- Cervus unicolor

Species
- See text

= Rusa (genus) =

Genus of deer

Rusa is a genus of deer from southern Asia. They have traditionally been included in Cervus, and genetic evidence suggests this may be more appropriate than their present placement in a separate genus.

Three of the four species have relatively small distributions in the Philippines and Indonesia, but the sambar is more widespread, ranging from India east and north to China and south to the Greater Sundas. All are threatened by habitat loss and hunting in their native ranges, but three of the species have also been introduced elsewhere.

The genus name derives from Malay rusa meaning "deer."

== Species ==
Image	Scientific name	Common name	Distribution
	Rusa alfredi	Visayan spotted deer, Philippine spotted deer	The Philippines.
	Rusa marianna	Philippine brown deer or Philippine sambar	Negros-Panay, Babuyan/Batanes, Palawan & the Sulu Faunal Regions, Philippines.
	Rusa timorensis	Javan rusa, Timor rusa, or Sunda sambar	East Timor; Indonesian islands of Flores, Gili Motang, Komodo and Rinca.
	Rusa unicolor	Sambar, Indian sambar-deer, Malayan sambar	Most of the temperate, subtropical & tropical Indian subcontinent south of the Himalayas (incl. Bangladesh, Nepal, Sri Lanka), mainland Southeast Asia (incl. Cambodia, Laos, Malaysian mainland, Myanmar, edges of Singapore, Thailand, Vietnam), Brunei, Indonesia (Borneo, Sumatra), southern China (including Hainan Island) and Taiwan.
