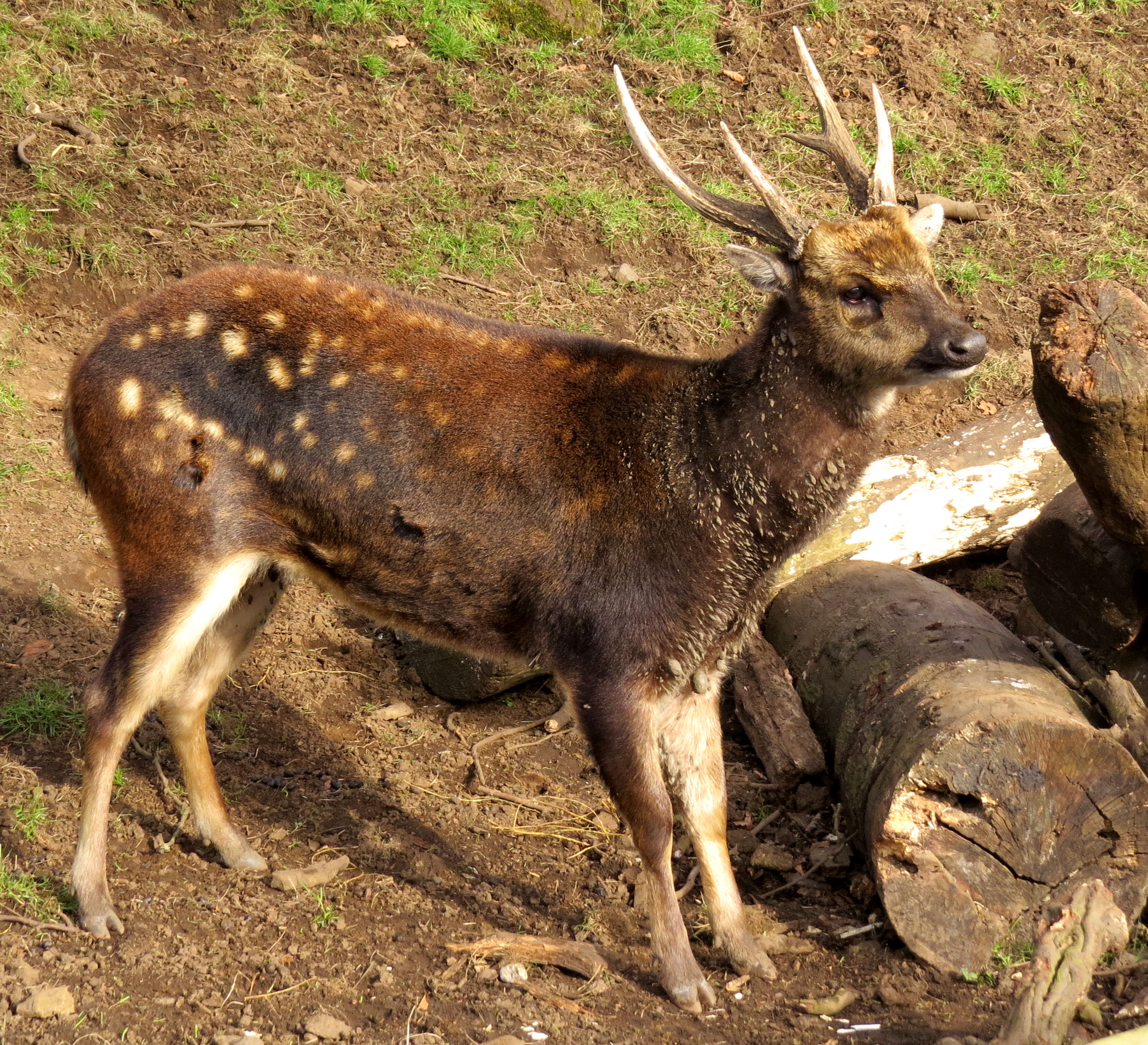
- At the Edinburgh Zoo, Edinburgh, Scotland

Conservation status
- Endangered (IUCN 3.1)

Scientific classification
- Kingdom: Animalia
- Phylum: Chordata
- Class: Mammalia
- Order: Artiodactyla
- Family: Cervidae
- Genus: Rusa
- Species: R. alfredi

Binomial name
- Rusa alfredi (Sclater, 1870)
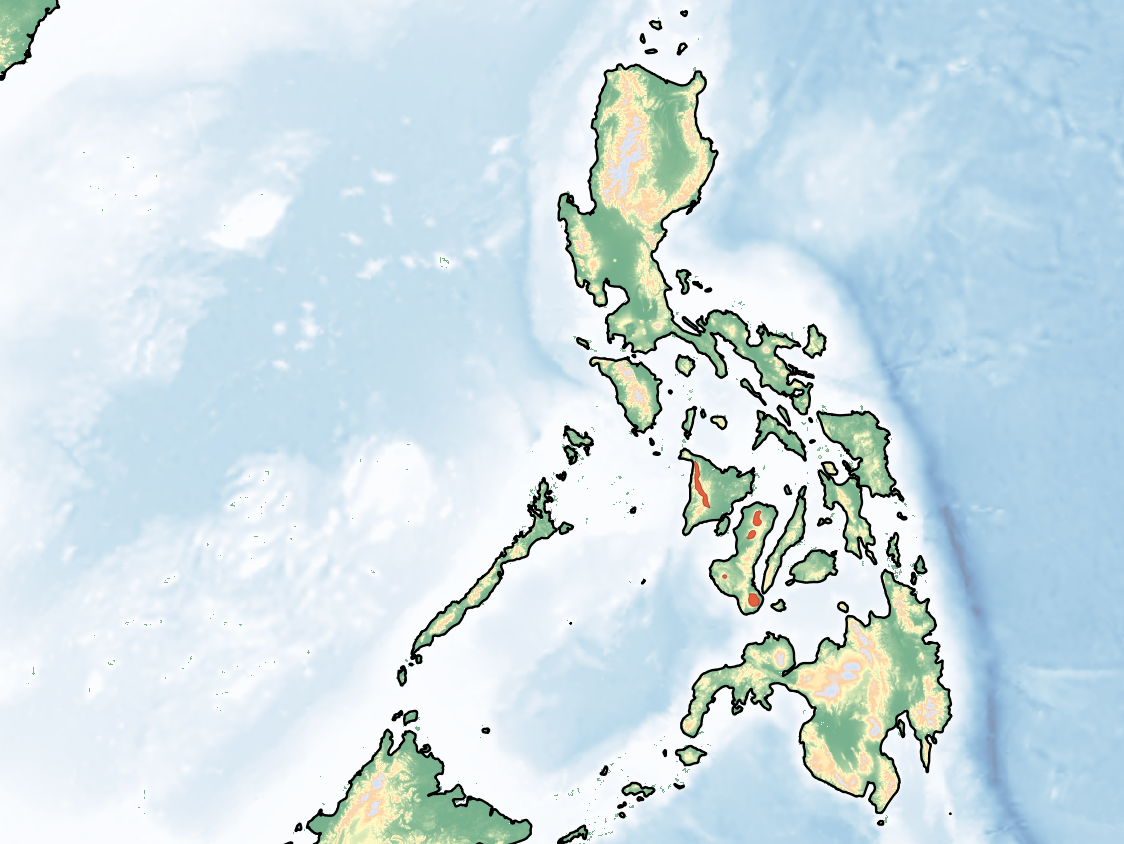

Synonyms
- Cervus alfredi Sclater, 1870

= Visayan spotted deer =

Species of deer

The Visayan spotted deer (Rusa alfredi), also known as the Visayan deer, the Philippine spotted deer or Prince Alfred's deer, is a small, endangered, primarily nocturnal species of deer found in the rainforests of the Visayan Islands of Panay and Negros. It once was found across other islands, such as Cebu, Guimaras, Leyte, Masbate, and Samar. It is one of three endemic deer species found in the Philippines, although it was not recognized as a separate species until 1983. An estimated 2,500 mature individuals survived worldwide in 1996, according to the IUCN; today's surviving wild number is uncertain. The diet of the deer, which consists of a variety of different types of grasses, leaves, and buds within the forest, is the primary indicator of its habitat. Since 1991, the range of the species has severely decreased and is now almost co-extensive with that of the Visayan warty pig.

In April 2009, an expedition team of British and Filipino mountaineers and scientists discovered evidence of two separate groups of deer in the North Negros Natural Park. These signs (scat and feeding sites) were believed to be the first scientific evidence of the deer's activity for over 25 years. It is estimated that 300 animals survive on the island of Negros. Conservation efforts are currently underway, with the intention of preserving the remaining population, but have been poorly funded and supported.

In 2012, the Negros Interior Biodiversity Expedition used camera traps in the centre of the North Negros Natural Park to take the first photos of the species in the wild.

== Description ==
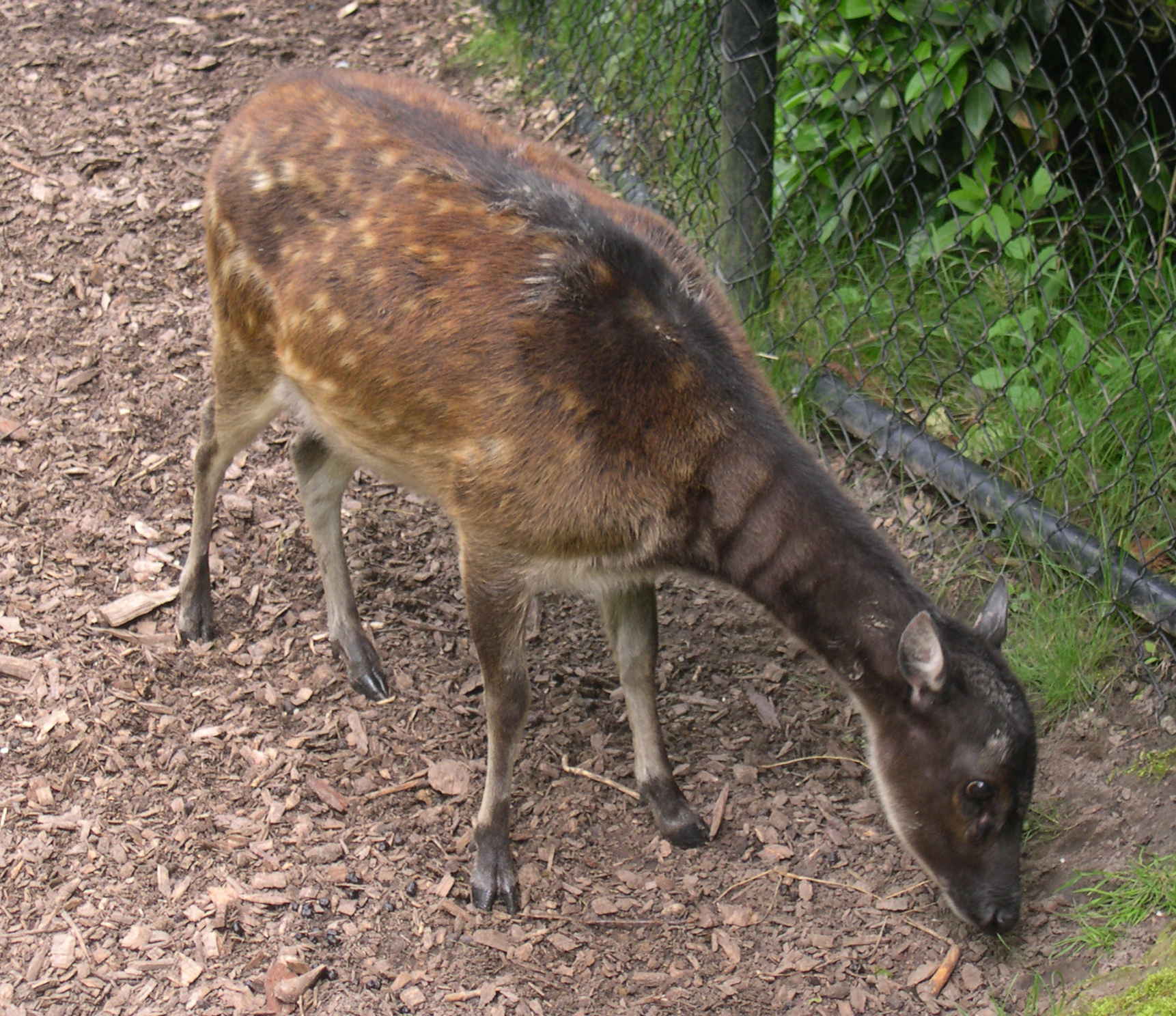
Female specimen in captivity

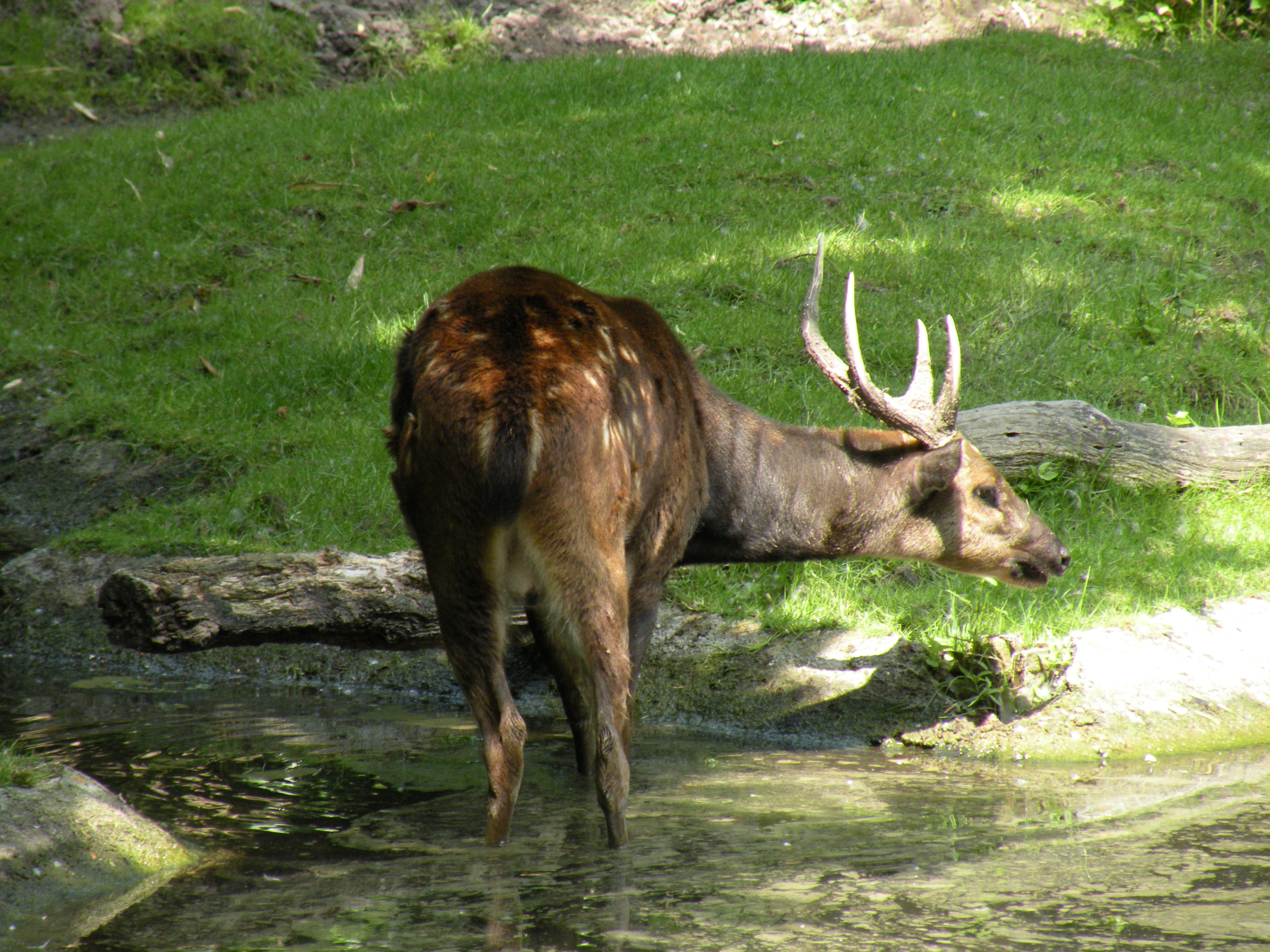
Young male

The Visayan deer is small and short-legged, but it is the largest endemic species of deer among the Philippine islands. Adults range from 125 to 130 cm (49 to 51 in) long from the head to the base of the tail, 70 to 80 cm (28 to 31 in) in shoulder height and 40 to 60 kg (88 to 132 lb) in weight. This species is easily distinguished from other species of deer in the Philippines by the distinctive "A"-pattern of beige spots on its deep brown back and sides. Other distinctive features include its cream underparts and white fur on the chin and lower lip. The animal's head and neck are brown, but lighter than the body, and the eyes are ringed with paler fur. Males are larger than females and have short, thick, bumpy antlers.

== Behaviour and ecology ==
=== Habitat ===
The species' range once covered the shoreline up to at least 2,000 m above sea level. Its habitat is in dense cogon grassland, and primary and secondary forest. Most of its habitat consists of areas where its diet of young shoots of cogon grass and young low-growing leaves and buds are plentiful. Besides areas that are dense in vegetation, it may also thrive in places where it can graze. They may also visit burnt-out forest clearings for the floral ash. Due to the now restricted range of the deer, it is not possible to ascertain the preferred habitat of the species.

=== Breeding ===
The deer have no specific breeding season as sightings of young in the wild occur year-round, and captive individuals breed throughout the entire year. Males have a roaring call to attract females. Reports mostly mention a single calf with a mated pair, although conclusive evidence on the number of young is not available because of the rarity of sightings. Calves are born after a gestation period of around 240 days. Weaning takes place at six months and the calves are mature from 12 months. The publication of a reference genome in 2025 should provide resources for guiding breeding and support the development of targeted conservation strategies among the captive population.

== Conservation ==
This species is fully protected under Philippine law. Hunting and forest clearances, as a result of logging activities and agricultural conversion, are thought to be the causes of a devastating drop in the numbers of the deer (a 1991 survey found that the deer was present in only 5% of its former range). Despite this, the deer still survive in the more remote areas, specifically in the protected habitats of Mt. Canlaon National Park, North Negros Forest Reserve, Southern Candoni, and West Panay Mountains (a proposed National Park). In 1990, the Philippine Spotted Deer Conservation Program was set up to facilitate the conservation of the species. Some of the deer have been held in captivity in Mari-it Conservation Centre in Panay, two breeding centers in Negros, and in a number of European zoos.

Since 1987, Silliman University Mammal Conservation Program, through the Center for Tropical Studies (CENTROP), has been engaged in the deer's captive breeding. The success of the program has led some of the captive-bred to be released in the inland forests of southern Negros, particularly in the interior of Basay, Negros Oriental.

=== Threats ===
Deforestation has greatly contributed in the decline of the deer. Hunting, both by locals and sport hunters has also made an impact; subsistence hunting, sales of venison to local markets and speciality restaurants, and live trapping for the pet trade have all contributed to the species' dwindling numbers. Isolation and reduction of population is likely to have led to some herds becoming moribund. While cross-breeding with R. mariannus has been observed in captivity, the lack of a common range means this is unlikely to be a problem in the wild.

Due to the severe pressures faced by the deer, the IUCN has twice listed it as an endangered species: firstly, in 1994 (when it was delisted within the year), and again, in 1996 (this listing has continued until the present). The limited numbers of the animal in the wild (at least 300, down from almost 1,600) has led to the belief that prospects for its survival are bleak.

== Rediscovery ==
In April 2009, footprints and droppings belonging to the creature were found in the North Negros Natural Park by a scientific team of six British, five Filipinos, and one Irishman, who were studying the biodiversity of the park. The team, who were from Negros Interior Biodiversity Expedition, estimate that less than 300 members of the species survive. The team discovered a set of footprints beside a river three days into the expedition. The distance between these footprints and a half-eaten set of young palm trees, which were found three days later, indicated that two groups of deer might be present in the nature preserve. Subsequently, the team found small piles of 20 to 30 pellets with a trail of deer footprints leading away. Because "other species, such as the Visayan warty pig and civet have distinctly different scat", the team was confident that the pellets belonged to the deer. This was the first evidence of a live, wild population of the deer in more than ten years. The team was thrilled by their success, although one of the expedition leaders, Craig Turner, admitted "this discovery confirms [the deer] are surviving, but doesn't tell us they are thriving". Besides the deer, other species discovered were some unusual and endemic plants, including ground orchids and pitcher plants, and many bird and frog species. Specimens were sent to the cities of Bacolod and Dumaguete for further analysis.

The animal was later featured in a front-page story in the Philippine Daily Inquirer on 24 May 2009 in the story "The World's Rarest Deer Still Roam Negros". In the story, the British Ambassador declared the find "an exciting discovery". The expedition team is reportedly set to present their findings to the Royal Geographical Society. Researchers involved in the expedition commented that "more protection" of the deer and similar endangered species in the park [is needed] "in order to assure their survival". They also said in the statement that "Philippine forests still harbor many rare and unique species, found nowhere else in the world". The expedition was sponsored by several environmental institutions and foundations, which are interested in promoting and protecting the biodiversity, present within the United Kingdom as well as in the Visayas in the Philippines, such as the Negros Forests and Ecological Foundation Inc., Silliman University, Coral Cay Conservation, and the Zoological Society of London. In 2013, there were reports of sightings in the Southern Candoni region, indicating Silliman's releases in Basay have successfully expanded north.

== See also ==
- Philippine brown deer (C. mariannus)
- Calamian hog deer (Axis calamianensis)
