= Dewil Valley =

Archaeological site in Palawan, Philippines

Dewil Valley, located in the northernmost part of Palawan, an island province of the Philippines that is located in the Mimaropa region, is an archaeological landscape composed of dozens of sites, thousands of artifacts and features. According to the University of the Philippines School of Archaeology, the closest settlement can be found in New Ibajay, which is covered by the town capital of El Nido, which is located around 9 km (5.6 mi) south-east of Dewil Valley. Physically it measures around 7 km (4.3 mi) long, and 4 km (2.5 mi) wide. It is in this place which the Ille Cave and Rockshelter site, one of the main archaeological sites, can be found. Ille is a karst tower with a network of 3 cave mouths located at its base. It has been discovered that this site in particular has been used and occupied by humans over multiple time periods, from the Later Pleistocene into more recent times.

Although excavations for this site have been done since 1998, surveys and recordings were done as early as the 1920s by Carl Guthe, in an attempt to record as many archaeological sites in northern Palawan as possible. This sparked the interest of Robert Fox (1970), but his work in the El Nido area was also limited to recording rather than excavations. It was only in 1990 that a full archaeological survey was made by the National Museum of the Philippines and it was only in 1998 that the first test excavation was started. In 1999, a full excavation by archaeologists Solheim, De La Torre, and Bautista. Since then, multiple excavations have been made, with the most substantial work being carried out by the Palawan Island Palaeohistory Research Project from 2004-2025, at several sites including Ille, Pasimbahan Magsanib, and several sites in the Makangit karst towers (see reports by the PIPRP 2004-2025 by Paz et al., Lewis et al., Carlos et al.).

== Archaeological discoveries ==
During the first excavation in 1998, archaeologists discovered shell middens and human burials. Excavations in Ille continued in 2000 and 2002 at the west mouth and east mouth with deeper excavations. Evidence of shell middens, burials and similar artifacts in previous excavations were found. Dating of the cultural deposits below the shell midden placed it at an age of around 10,000 years old. Continued excavations in 2004 resulted to the discovery of more human burials. In 2005, artifacts such as decorated pottery and nephrite ornaments reinforced the connection of Palawan to Mainland Southeast Asia. Excavations in 2006 resulted in a greater understanding of the stratigraphy of the cave and the first cremation burial was first uncovered in the east mouth trench. In the field season in 2007 of Ille cave, approximately eleven complete and incomplete burials were found in the east and west mouth trenches including possibly human cremations and tiger bones in the east mouth trench. Further exploration of other cave sites in the valley found evidence of human activity along with archaeological features and burials with grave goods, including near the cave entrance of Pasimbahan Magsanib. In 2008, continuing excavations of the Ille site reconfirmed the practice of cremation with the recovery of two cremation features at the 9000 years deposit. Excavations have continued into 2025, with many additional findings of human burials, ritual feasting deposits, animal bones etc., and there are annual reports from 2004-2024, and many publications still to be incorporated into this article.

=== Ille Cave ===
Ille Cave is part of a massive Late Eocene Pabellion karst-formation in New Ibajay, El Nido, Palawan. It is about 100 m (330 ft) high and has an overhang about 10 m (33 ft) high that extends from the mouth of the cave. It is located at the base of a 75 m (246 ft) limestone tower. The cave has two main mouths facing the south: the east mouth and the west mouth. Both mouths have large trenches placed on them. Vegetation of mostly secondary growth trees surround and top the cave. The ground of the cave is mostly dry, but some areas are wet due to the water dripping down from the ceiling. Based on radiocarbon dating, the cave was used as a habitation and burial site (Neolithic to Protohistoric). In 1998 alone, 20,000 artifacts were excavated by the National Museum and the Archaeological Studies Program of the University of the Philippines Diliman and the Solheim Foundation. Several artifacts date back to circa 14,000 years ago. Adze blades and their fragments were used as samples to determine the date of the cave and it was discovered that the cave was used extensively during the late Paleolithic and later prehistoric periods. Ongoing excavation has determined the cave to be continuously inhabited from fairly recent times back to the Late Pleistocene.

=== Burials ===
More than 32 burials in various phases have been discovered and recorded from this site. Most burials at the oldest phase have been found to have bivalve shell beddings under the buried individuals (UP-ASP, 2008). Burials were also found with associated metal objects, and Indo-Pacific beads. The recovered remains point to its community having early and long-time burial traditions, as well as possibilities of jar burials (from sherds found). There is an evident practice of cremation of remains, as both human and animal remains with evidence of burning were found in a group of pits/distintegrated containers like baskets, making this the only evident "cremation cemetery" of this age, so far. An evidence of a complex burial ritual was also discovered. The ritual involves an elaborate process of defleshing and disarticulation of bones, crushing of (large) bones, and lastly, cremation and burial. As the remains were also found to be tightly concentrated and compact, it was suggested that it might have been placed in a container that decomposed later on. The found remains were suggested to be of a young adult to middle adult female, dated 9000–9400 years old. Currently, this is the earliest-dated and best documented burial group of this kind in Southeast Asia.

=== Ceramics ===
A variety of earthenware pottery sherds were recovered from the site, amounting to approximately 12,600 pieces even by 2010. Unfortunately, these finds cannot be confidently associated with any of the surfaces in the site due to bioturbation and cemetery digging (postdepositional disturbance) of the layers where most of the sherds were discovered. However, some of the decorated sherds were traced back to 4000–5000 years ago, mostly red-slipped with impressed circular designs, with some circles filled white with either lime or clay. Other sherds were associated with the so-called "Metal Period" (which was around 2500 to 1500 years ago in Philippine archaeology) due to their designs with geometric forms (with some painted red), commonly associated with this period. Large pieces of undecorated sherds were also found that may have been fragments from burial jars.

The majority of the pottery decorations are associated with Sa Hyunh-Kalanay pottery. Variations of the designs (in both technical and stylistic aspects) between the pottery from Ille and other sites in the Dewil Valley suggests that these may have been adapted from other traded pottery. Evidence of pottery firing has also been found in Ille cave. While there are no primary jar burials at this site, Ille pottery would have probably played a vital role in burial practices of its communities of practice.

Tradeware, although limited, is also found in the Dewil Valley. Tradeware sherds recovered from the Ille platform were mostly brown stoneware, celadon, whiteware and brownware. These brown-glazed sherds are determined to be "dusan" jars from the 10th century CE. On the other hand, sherds found on the Ille tower were blue-and-white and quite a lot in number, making them easy to pick out.

=== Ancient animal bones and plant remains ===
Many ancient remains were found in different sites in the Dewil Valley. An excavation in Ille Cave, near the village of New Ibajay, provided the first proof that the tiger (Panthera tigris) once roamed the island of Palawan. A complete basal phalanx of the second digit of the left manus and the distal portion of a sub-terminal phalanx of the second digit of the left manus of a tiger specimen were recovered from the site. Also, a distal end and midshaft of a sub-terminal phalanx of another tiger were obtained. Additionally, the condition of the tiger bones, dated to approximately 11,000 to 10,000 years ago, differed from other fossils in the assemblage.. The tiger subfossils showed longitudinal fracture of the cortical bone due to weathering, which suggests that they had post-mortem been exposed to light and air. Tiger parts were commonly used as amulets in South and Southeast Asia, so it may be that the tiger parts were imported from elsewhere, as is the case with tiger canine teeth, which were found in Ambangan sites dating to the 10th to 12th centuries in Butuan, Mindanao. On the other hand, the proximity of Borneo and Palawan also makes it likely that the tiger had colonized Palawan from Borneo before the Early Holocene.

From the late Pleistocene until the early Holocene epoch, there was an abundance of deer in the island. However, deer became rarer while the number of pigs increased during Mid Holocene based on the records from the Ille and Pasimbahan sites.(Ochoa, et al. 2014) said that "the increased number of pig remains and scarcity of deer in the middle Holocene middens of Pasimbahan also strengthen the observation that there is a clear shift from deer to pig hunting by the middle Holocene".

Aside from faunal remains, plant fossils were also recovered from the different sites. Many plant remains such as seeds, wood fragments and plant tissues were obtained from the Pasimbahan – Magsanib site. After the sampling of archaeobotanical remains, results showed that "six out of the eleven plant tissues, seeds and nuts were found to be consistently transformed, either charred or probably mineralized state"(Ochoa, et al. 2014) The recovered seeds of Boehmeria, Platanifolia, and Macaranga were also said to be mineralized. Carbonized remains found include all fragments of Canarium hirsutum and another nut, parenchymatous tissues and wood fragments. Archaeobotany evidences from the site also point that the inhabitants practiced arboriculture and the collection of wild nuts.

=== Stone tools ===
In total, there were more than 1000 stone tools discovered out of 50,000 artefacts recorded from Ille Cave by 2008 since the start of the excavations in 1998 under the direction of Wilhelm Solheim. These stone tools and other artifacts recovered helped provide estimate timeline for the deposit of the cave for the site. Excavations of both east and west mouth of Ille Cave in 2005 by the UP-ASP also showed presence of other stone materials and stone tools. It was reported that the sequence in the east mouth that was of silty topsoil contained post-Neolithic artifacts which includes stone and shell beads. In the west mouth, some graves were found with stone adze which may date to an early phase. Stone adzes are also some of the most significant artifacts found in the excavations in the southern half of the trench of the west mouth.(Lewis, et al., 2006) Aside from this, stone flakes were also found in Phase E, the habitation and cremation practice phase dated 8,000 to c.a. 10,000, of Pasimbahan site located within the Magsanib district of Dewil.

In addition, the assemblage of artifacts discovered by the UP-ASP and National Museum in the deposit labeled Midden 2, one of the caves in the Dewil Valley which was first investigated for its archaeological material in the year 2007, were composed of mainly of stone tools, together with consumed animal remains and shell fish. Stone tools found in Midden 2 were cobble size stone tools associated with shell food remains, and pig bones. These finds negated the hypothesis that the deposits labeled Midden 2 were not actually an in situ assemblage of stones, bones, and shells.(Ronquillo, et al., 2008)

=== Cultural heritage ===
In the 1960s, Robert Fox (1970) headed a National Museum team that continued Guthe's work in northern Palawan; new sites were added to the list of sites first described by Guthe. A good number of these sites were from small islands located in Bacuit Bay. Of the sites Guthe surveyed, there were a few that National Museum excavated. One such site excavated in the 1960s was Leta-leta cave. Located in Lagen island, in the bay of Bacuit; the conclusion of the 1960s excavation led Fox (1970) to confidently describe the archaeology as a "Metal Age" burial site. The excavation was highlighted by the recovered unique earthenware jar with a mouth fashioned to look like a yawning/shouting person. This unique jar is now considered a national heritage artefact and displayed in the National Museum in Manila.

The PIPRP has spent a great deal of time working with local people in the Dewil Valley on cultural heritage matters, has built a museum that can be visited - the Dewil Valley Museum - and was instrumental in the declaration of the Dewil Valley as a Philippine National Cultural Treasure
