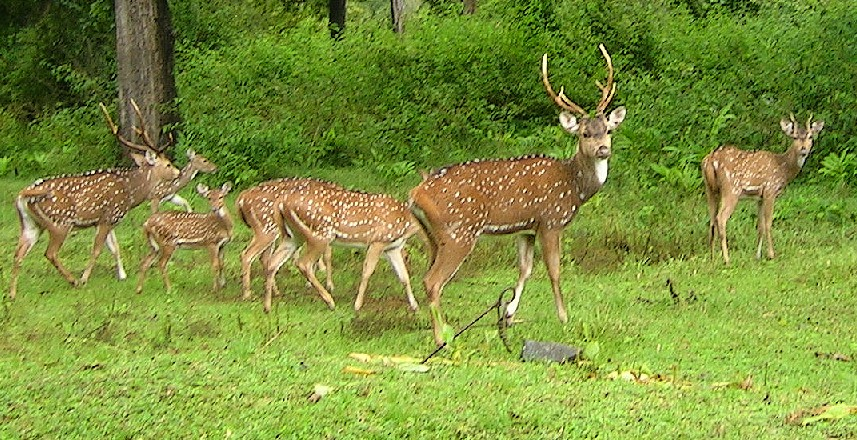
- Axis axis

Scientific classification
- Kingdom: Animalia
- Phylum: Chordata
- Class: Mammalia
- Order: Artiodactyla
- Family: Cervidae
- Tribe: Cervini
- Genus: Axis; Smith, 1827

Type species
- Cervus axis Erxleben, 1777

Species
- See text

= Axis (genus) =

Genus of mammals

Axis is a genus of deer occurring in South and Southeast Asia. As presently defined by most authorities, four species are placed in the genus. Three of the four species are called hog deer. The genus name is a word mentioned in Pliny the Elder's Natural History.

== Species ==
Following the third edition of Mammal Species of the World from 2005, which is also followed by the American Society of Mammalogists, four species are placed in Axis. These four species are divided into two subgenera; Axis containing the chital, and Hyelaphus containing the 3 others.

Genus Axis – Smith, 1827 – four species
Common name	Scientific name and subspecies	Range	Size and ecology	IUCN status and estimated population
Chital, spotted deer, or axis deer	Axis axis (Erxleben, 1777)	Indian subcontinent, including Sri Lanka	Size: Habitat: Diet:	LC
Calamian deer	Axis calamianensis (Heude, 1888)	Calamian Islands in Palawan, the Philippines	Size: Habitat: Diet:	EN
Bawean deer or Kuhl's deer	Axis kuhlii (Temminck, 1836)	Bawean Island in Indonesia	Size: Habitat: Diet:	CR
Indian hog deer	Axis porcinus (Zimmermann, 1780)	northern plains of Indian subcontinent to Myanmar, parts of Indochina	Size: Habitat: Diet:	EN
