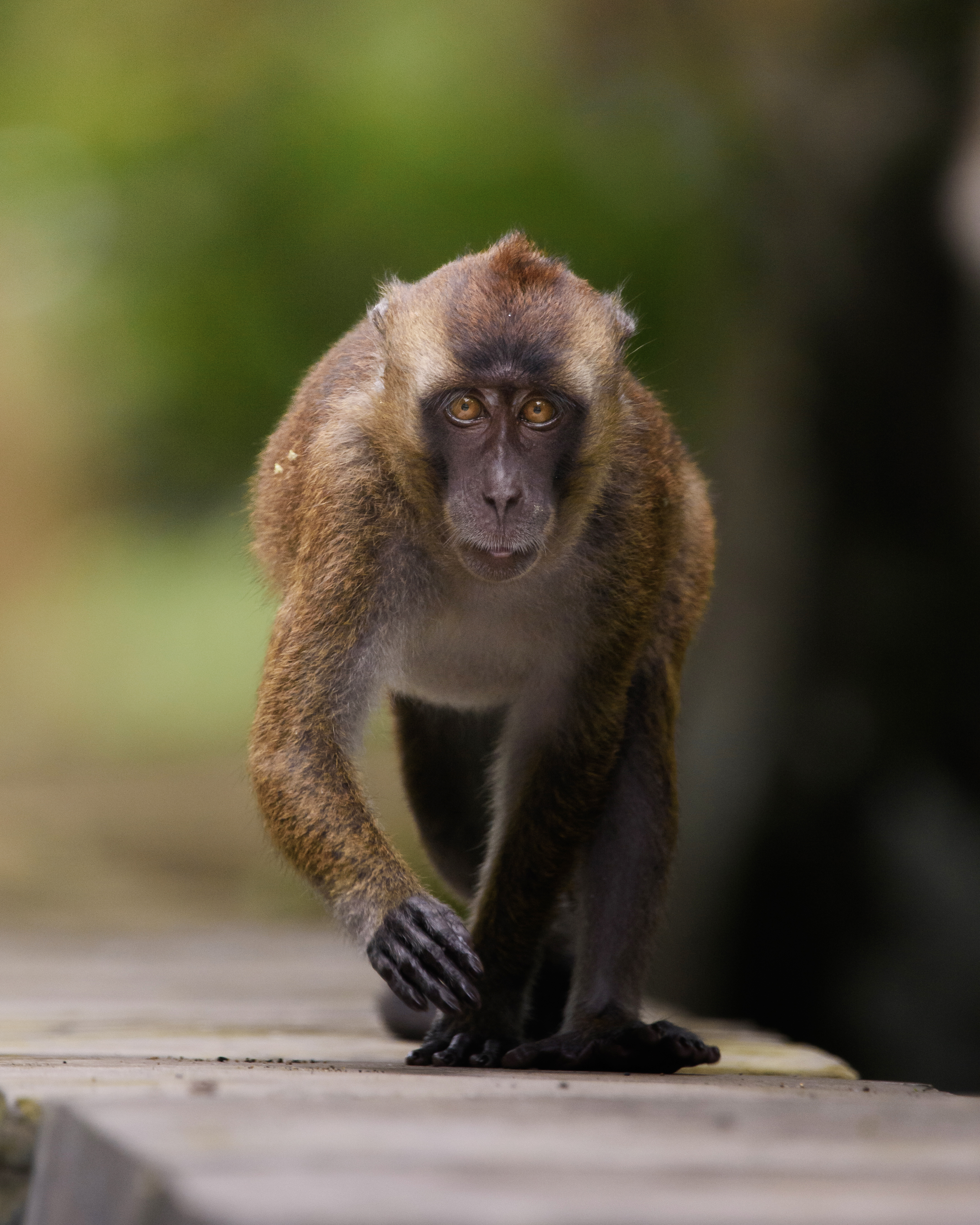
- Philippine long-tailed macaque in Quezon, Philippines

Conservation status
- Near Threatened (IUCN 3.1)

Scientific classification
- Kingdom: Animalia
- Phylum: Chordata
- Class: Mammalia
- Order: Primates
- Family: Cercopithecidae
- Genus: Macaca
- Species: M. fascicularis
- Subspecies: M. f. philippensis

Trinomial name
- Macaca fascicularis philippensis I. Geoffroy, 1843

= Philippine long-tailed macaque =

Subspecies of Old World monkey

The Philippine long-tailed macaque (Macaca fascicularis philippensis) is a subspecies of the crab-eating macaque, known in various Philippine languages as matching/matsing or the more general term unggoy ("monkey"). It is endemic to the Philippine forests and woodlands, but especially in the mangrove forests of western central Philippines— particularly in Palawan, the Visayas, and Mindanao. The names M. f. philippinensis and M. f. philippinenesis have also been used, but arise from orthographical error.

== Characteristics ==
The Philippine long-tailed macaque has a reddish-brown coat. It can reach a length of 890–1,200 mm (35–47 in). Its tail has an average length of 440 to 600 mm (17 to 24 in). Males weigh 4–8 kg (8.8–17.6 lb), but females only attain 3–4 kg (6.6–8.8 lb). Like most primates, the Philippine long tailed macaque is omnivorous.

== Distribution and habitat ==
The Philippine long-tailed macaque is found on the Philippine islands of Balabac, Basilan, Biliran, Bohol, Busuanga, Camiguin, Catanduanes, Culion, Leyte, Luzon, northeastern Mindanao, Mindoro, Negros, Panay, Palawan, Samar, and Sibuyan. It has been found at elevations up to 1,800 metres (5,900 ft).

== Fossils ==
Fossils excavated in Palawan were identified as being of the Philippine long-tailed macaque, deer, Palawan bearded pig, Bornean tiger, small mammals, lizards, snakes and turtles. From the stone tools, besides the evidence for cuts on the bones, and the use of fire, it would appear that early humans had accumulated the bones. In prehistoric times, the Greater Sunda Islands of Borneo might have been connected to Palawan during the penultimate and previous glacial periods, judging from the molecular phylogeny of muridae.

== See also ==
- Puerto Princesa Subterranean River National Park, Palawan

== Gallery ==
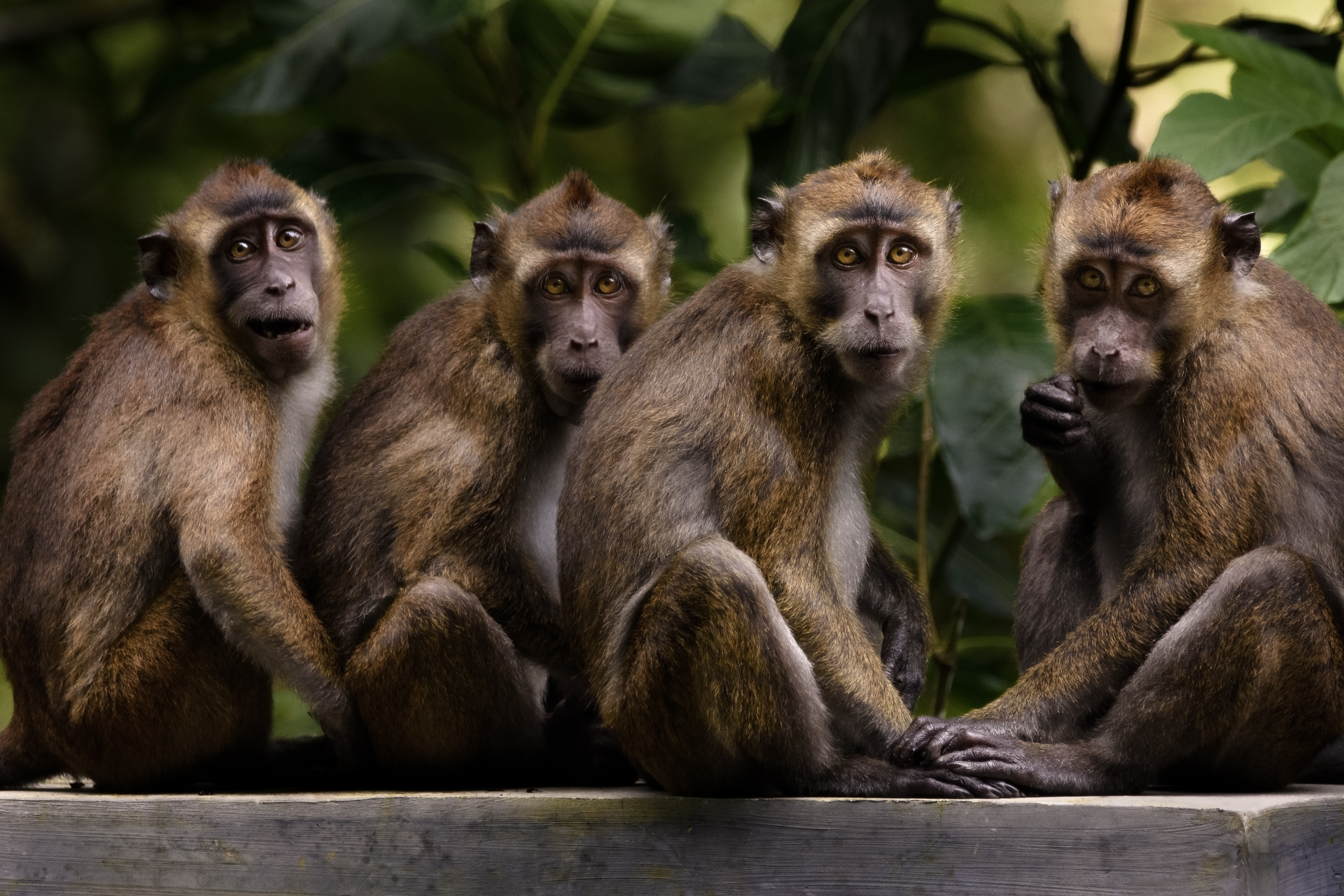
A troop of Philippine long-tailed macaque in Palawan

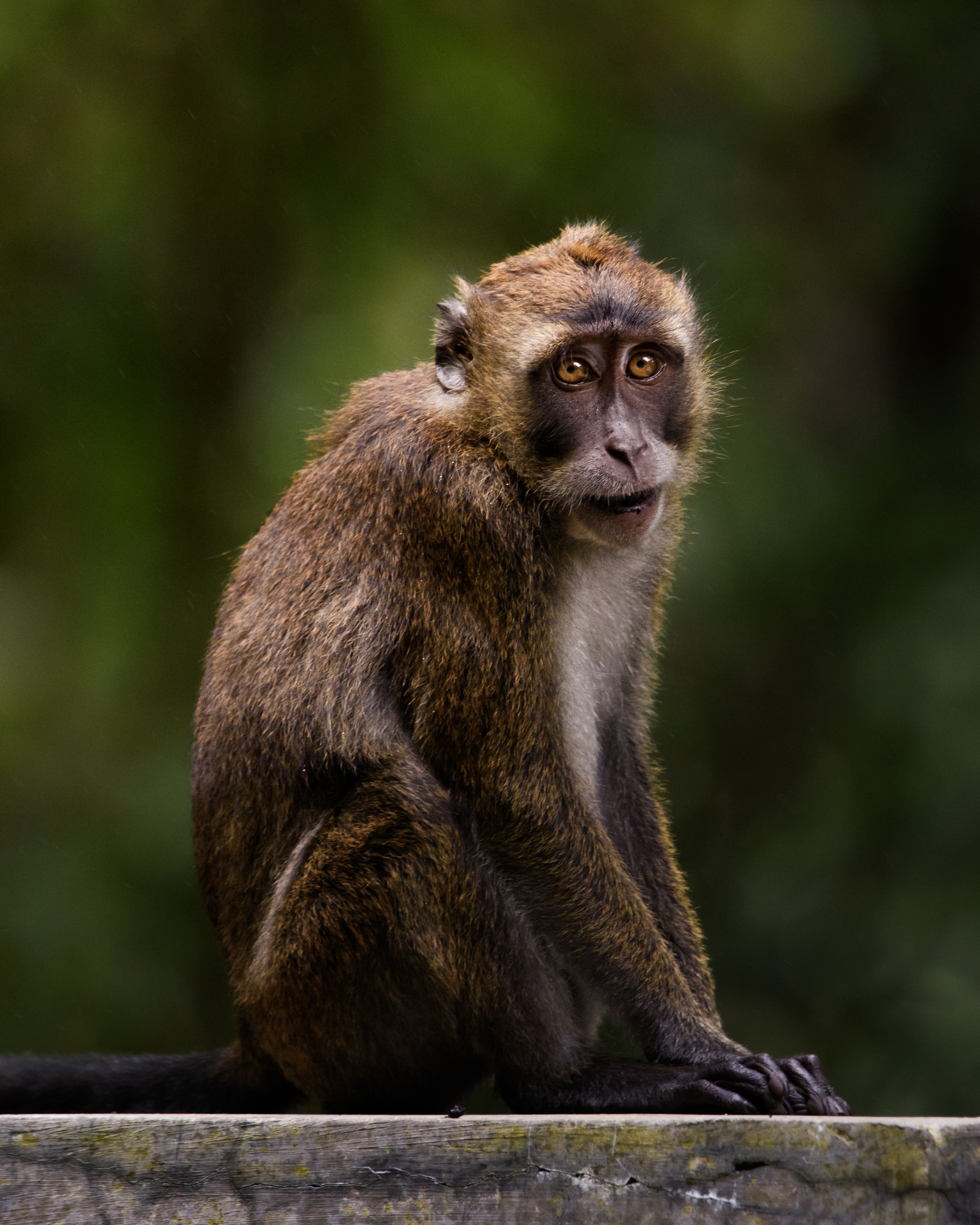
Portrait of a Philippine long-tailed macaque

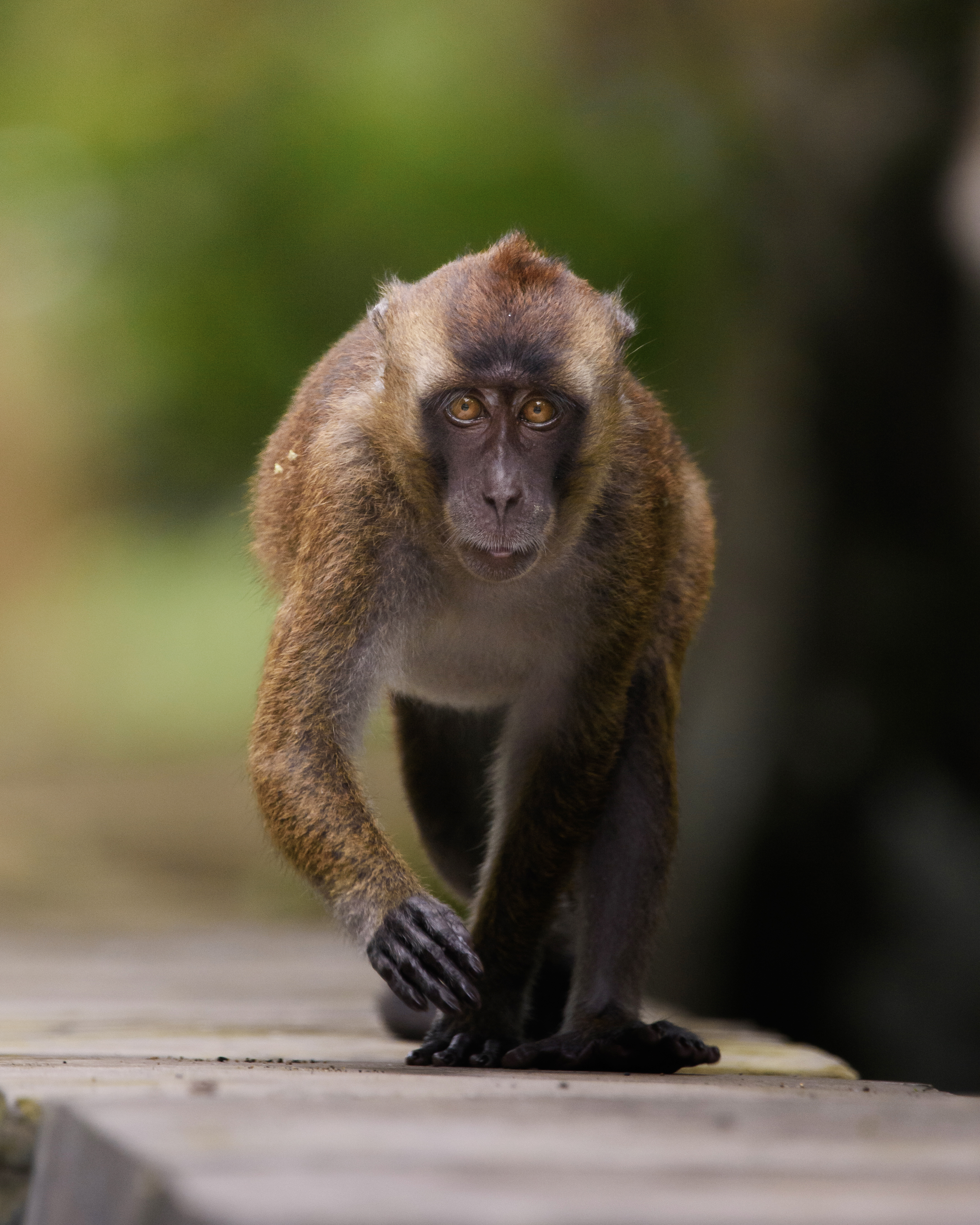
A macaque in Quezon Protected Landscape

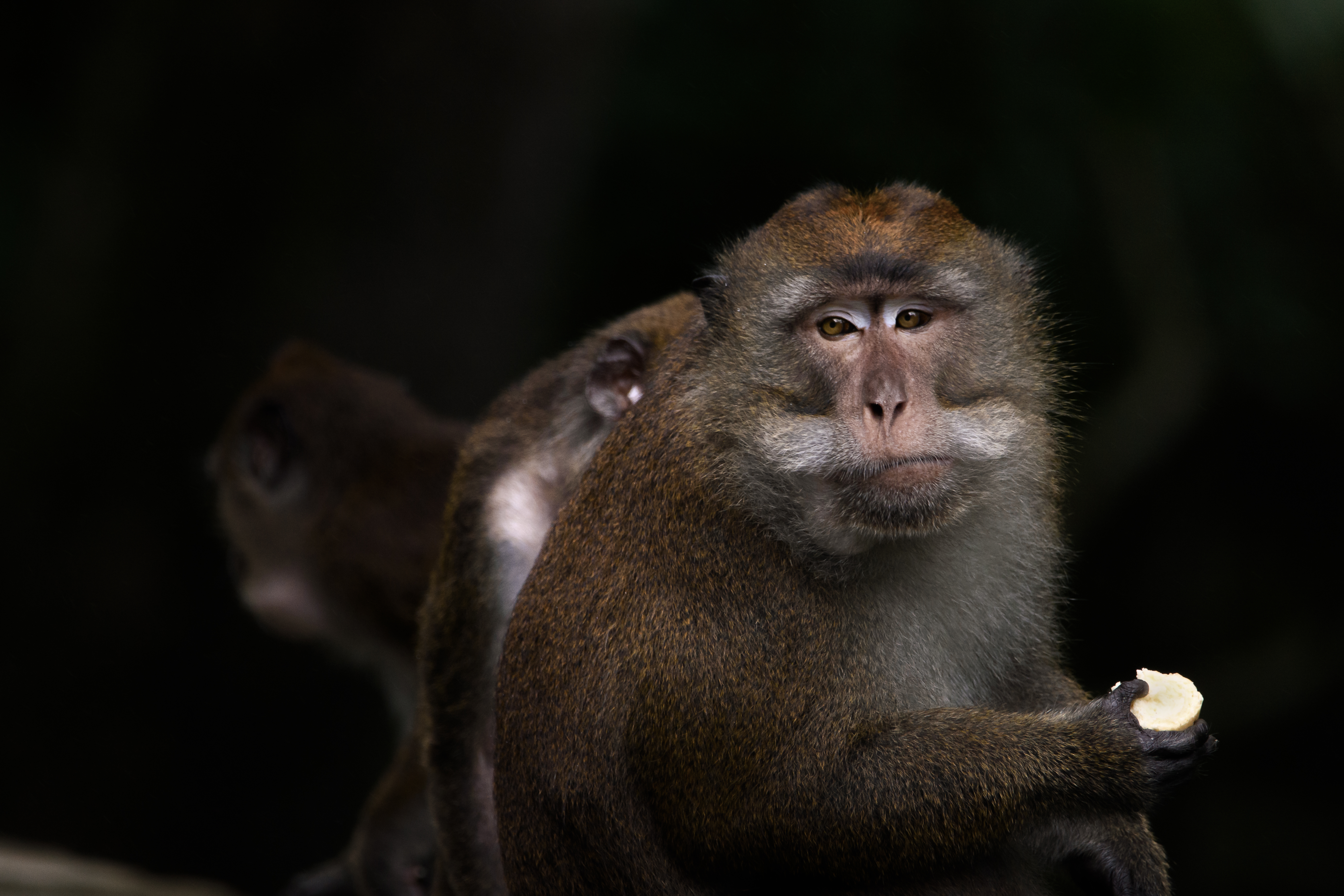
A macaque eating a piece of bread
