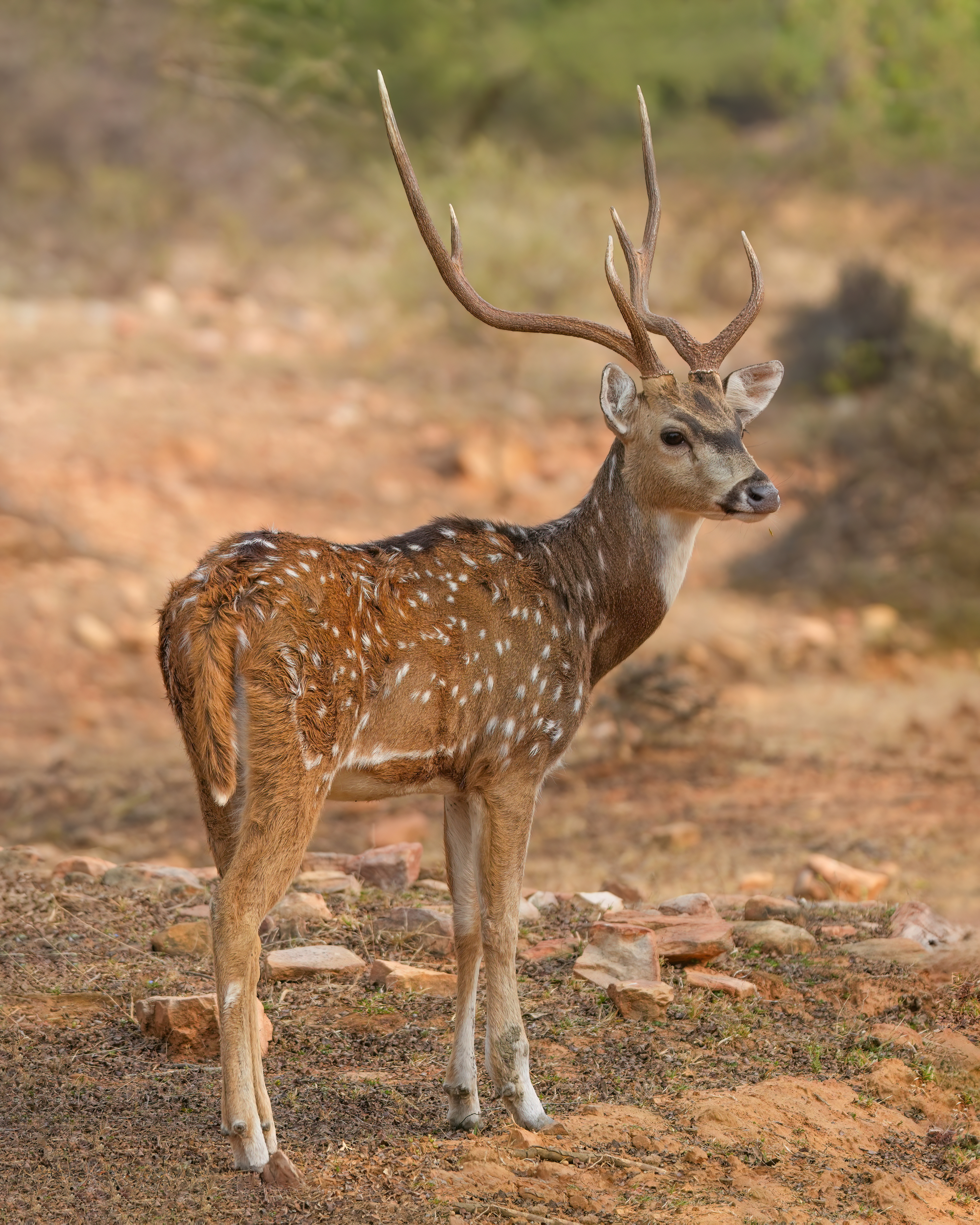
- Buck in Ranthambore National Park
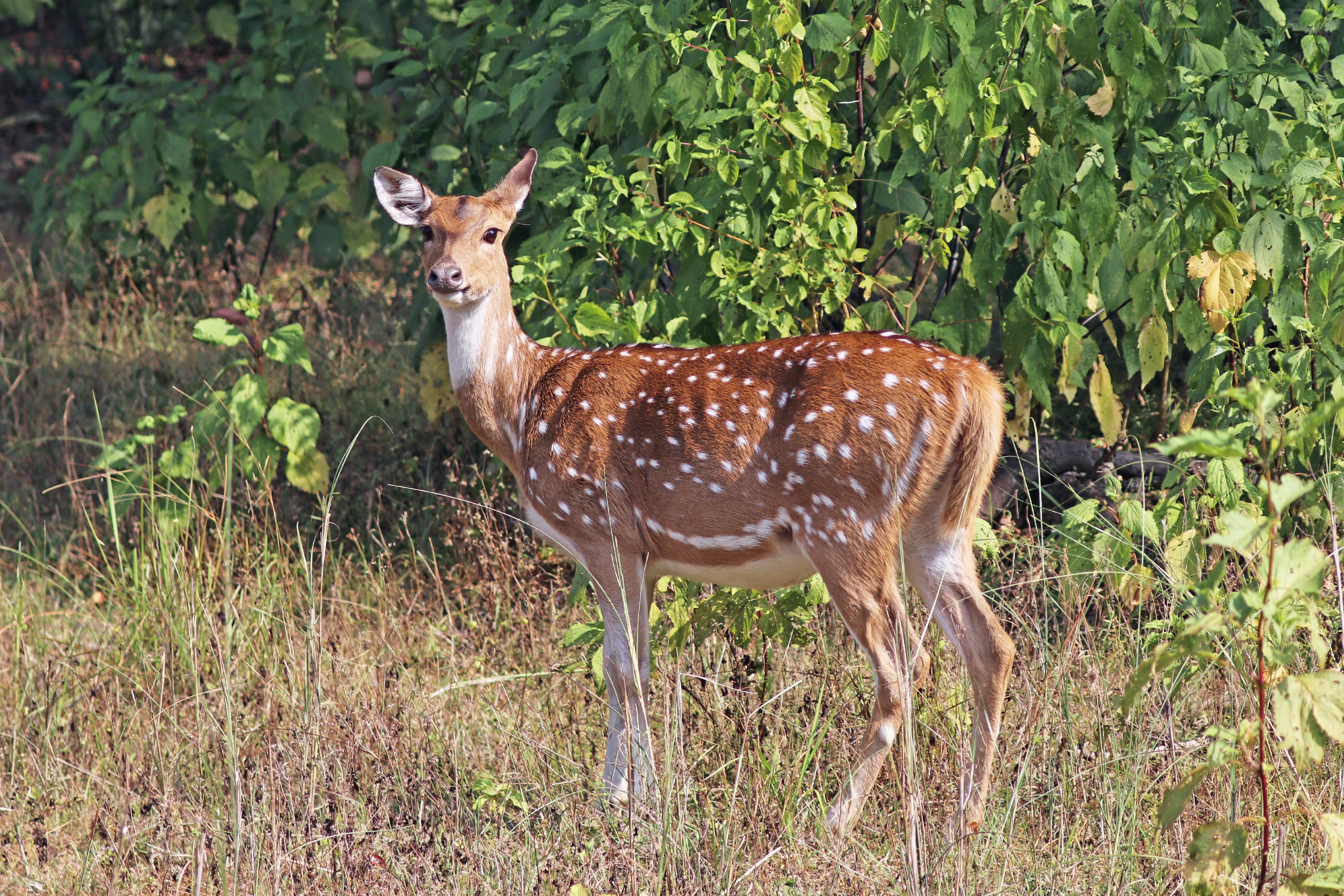
- Doe in Kanha National Park in Madhya Pradesh

Conservation status
- Least Concern (IUCN 3.1)

Scientific classification
- Kingdom: Animalia
- Phylum: Chordata
- Class: Mammalia
- Order: Artiodactyla
- Family: Cervidae
- Genus: Axis
- Species: A. axis

Binomial name
- Axis axis (Erxleben, 1777)
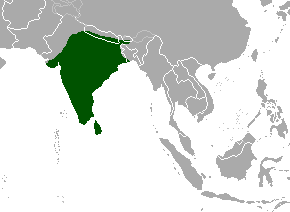
- Distribution of chital (2011)

Synonyms
- List: Axis major Hodgson, 1842; A. minor Hodgson, 1842; Cervus axis ceylonensis (J. B. Fischer, 1829); C. a. indicus (J. B. Fischer, 1829); C. a. maculatus (Kerr, 1792); C. a. zeylanicus (Lydekker, 1905); C. nudipalpebra (Ogilby, 1831); Rusa axis zeylanicus (Lydekker, 1905)

= Chital =

Chital Temporal range: Middle Pleistocene-Present

Species of deer

The chital (Axis axis; /tʃiːtəl/), also called spotted deer and axis deer, is a deer species native to the Indian subcontinent. It was first described by Johann Christian Polycarp Erxleben in 1777. A moderate-sized deer, male chital reach 90 cm (35 in) and females 70 cm (28 in) at the shoulder. While males weigh 70–90 kg (150–200 lb), females weigh around 40–60 kg (88–132 lb). It is sexually dimorphic; males are larger than females, and antlers are present only on males. The upper parts are golden to rufous, completely covered in white spots. The abdomen, rump, throat, insides of legs, ears, and tail are all white. The antlers, three-pronged, are nearly 1 m (3 ft 3 in) long.

== Etymology ==
The vernacular name "chital" (pronounced /tʃiːtəl/) comes from cītal (Hindi: चीतल), derived from the Sanskrit word citrala (चित्रल), meaning "variegated" or "spotted". The name of the cheetah has a similar origin. Variations of "chital" include "cheetal" and "cheetul". Other common names for the chital are Indian spotted deer (or simply the spotted deer) and axis deer.

== Taxonomy and phylogeny ==
The chital was first described by Johann Christian Polycarp Erxleben in 1777 as Cervus axis. In 1827, Charles Hamilton Smith placed the chital in its own subgenus Axis under the genus Cervus. Axis was elevated to generic status by Colin P. Groves and Peter Grubb in 1987. The genus Hyelaphus was considered a subgenus of Axis. However, a morphological analysis showed significant differences between Axis and Hyelaphus. A phylogenetic study later that year showed that Hyelaphus is closer to the genus Rusa than Axis. Axis was revealed to be paraphyletic and distant from Hyelaphus in the phylogenetic tree; the chital was found to form a clade with the barasingha (Rucervus duvaucelii) and the Schomburgk's deer (Rucervus schomburgki). The chital was estimated to have genetically diverged from the Rucervus lineage in the Early Pliocene about 5 million years ago. The following cladogram is based on a 2006 phylogenetic study:

- - Cervus, fallow deer (Dama dama), Père David's deer (Elaphurus davidianus) and Rusa
  - - Rucervus
      - Barasingha
      - Schomburgk's deer
    - Axis
      - Chital
      - Indian hog deer (A. porcinus)
- Muntjacs (Muntiacus)

Fossils of extinct Axis species dating to the early to Middle Pliocene were excavated from Iran in the west to Indochina in the east. Remains of the chital were found in the Middle Pleistocene deposits of Thailand along with sun bear, Stegodon, gaur, wild water buffalo and other living and extinct mammals.

== Description ==
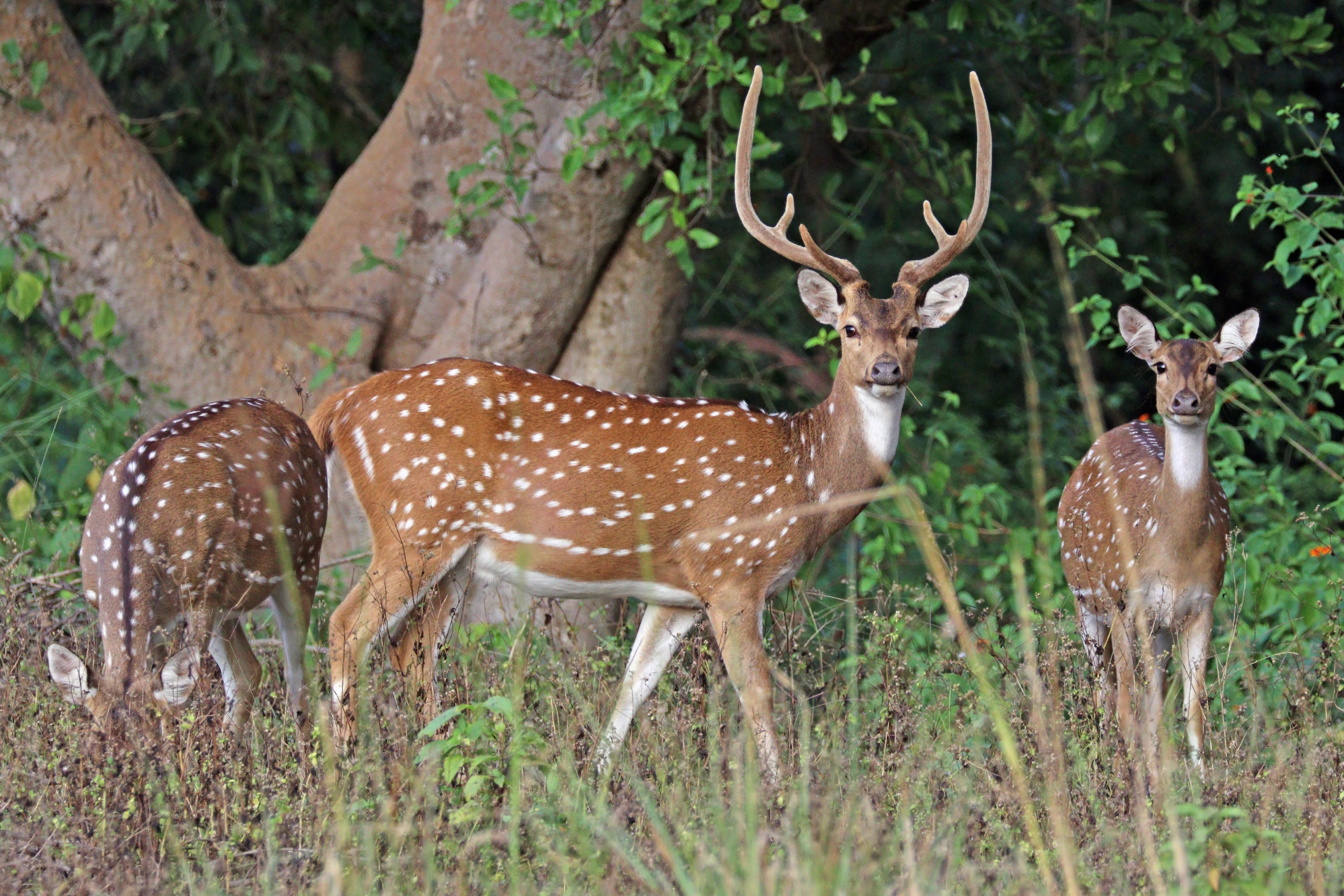
Male chital in velvet, Kanha National Park

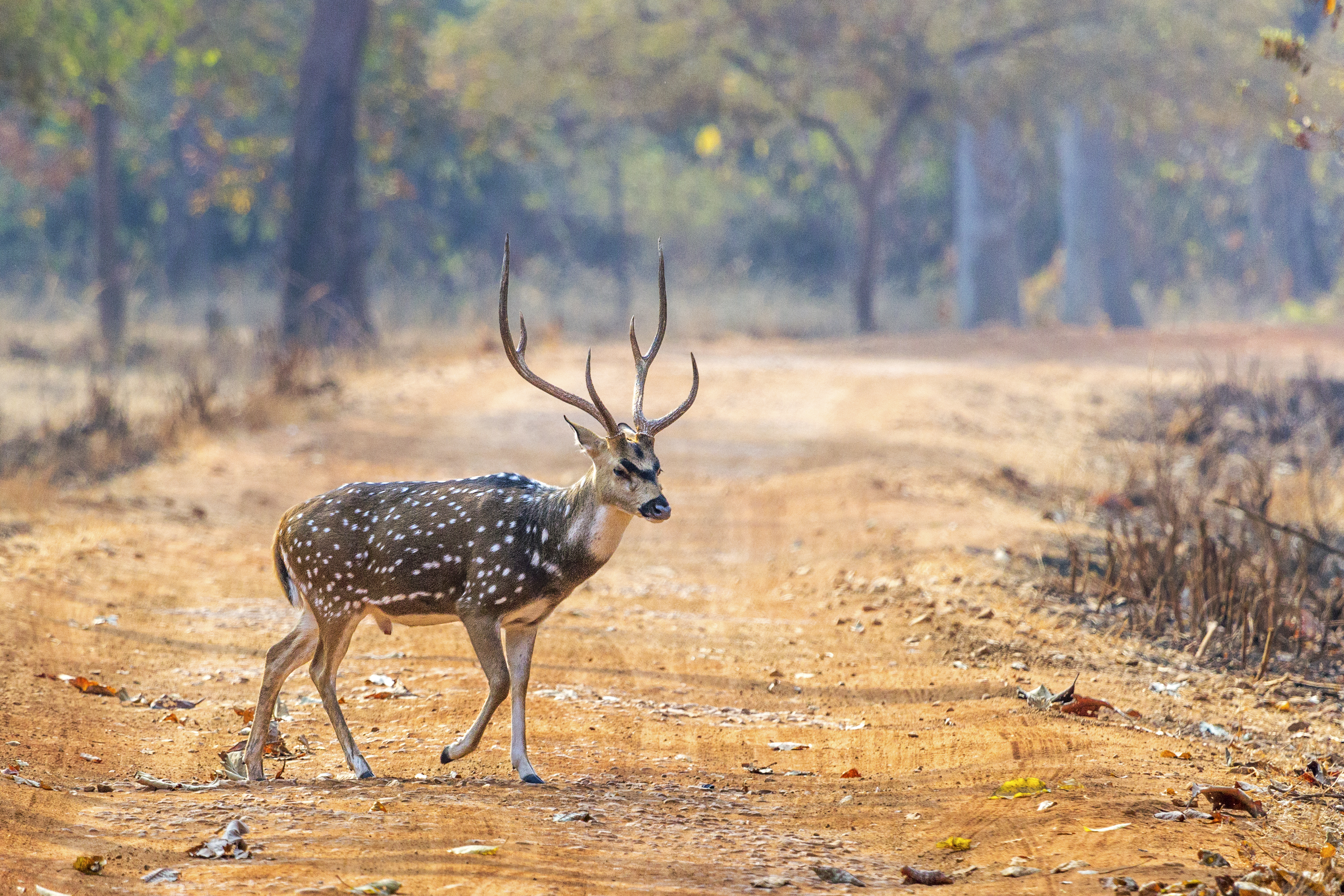
Chital stag in Tadoba Andhari Tiger Reserve

The chital is a moderately sized deer. Males reach up to 90–100 cm (35–39 in) and females 65–75 cm (26–30 in) at the shoulder; the head-and-body length is around 1.7 m (5 ft 7 in). While immature males weigh 30–75 kg (66–165 lb), the lighter females weigh 25–45 kg (55–99 lb). Mature stags can weigh up to 98–110 kg (216–243 lb). The tail, 20 cm (7.9 in) long, is marked by a dark stripe that stretches along its length. The species is sexually dimorphic; males are larger than females, and antlers are present only on males.

Male with velvet antlers near IIT Madras, Tamil Nadu

The dorsal (upper) parts are golden to rufous, completely covered in white spots. The abdomen, rump, throat, insides of legs, ears, and tail are all white. A conspicuous black stripe runs along the spine (back bone). The chital has well-developed preorbital glands (near the eyes) with stiff hairs. It also has well-developed metatarsal glands and pedal glands located in its hind legs. The preorbital glands, larger in males than in females, are frequently opened in response to certain stimuli.

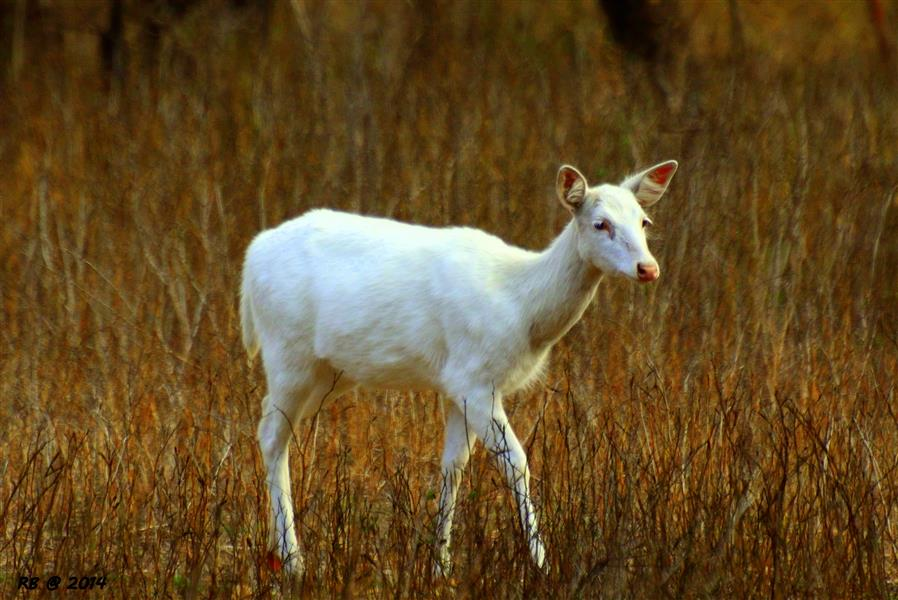
Albino chital in Ranthambore National Park

Each of the antlers has three lines on it. The brow tine (the first division in the antler) is roughly perpendicular to the beam (the central stalk of the antler). The antlers, three-pronged, are nearly 1 m (3 ft 3 in) long. Antlers, as in most other cervids, are shed annually. The antlers emerge as soft tissues (known as velvet antlers) and progressively harden into bony structures (known as hard antlers), following mineralisation and blockage of blood vessels in the tissue, from the tip to the base. A study of the mineral composition of the antlers of captive barasingha, chital, and hog deer showed that the antlers of the deer are very similar. The mineral content of the chital's antlers was determined to be (per kg) 6.1 mg (0.094 gr) copper, 8.04 mg (0.1241 gr) cobalt, and 32.14 mg (0.4960 gr) zinc.

Hooves measure between 4.1 and 6.1 cm (1.6 and 2.4 in) in length; hooves of the fore legs are longer than those of the hind legs. The toes taper to a point. The dental formula is 0.1.3.33.1.3.3, same as the elk. The milk canine, nearly 1 cm (0.39 in) long, falls off before one year of age, but is not replaced by a permanent tooth as in other cervids. Compared to the hog deer, the chital has a more cursorial build. The antlers and brow tines are longer than those in the hog deer. The pedicles (the bony cores from which antlers arise) are shorter, and the auditory bullae are smaller in the chital. The chital may be confused with the fallow deer. Chital have several white spots, whereas fallow deer usually have white splotches. Fallow also have palmate antlers whereas chital have 3 distinct points on each side. The chital has a prominent white patch on its throat, while the throat of the fallow deer is completely white. The biggest distinction is the dark brown stripe running down the chital's back. The hairs are smooth and flexible.

== Distribution and habitat ==
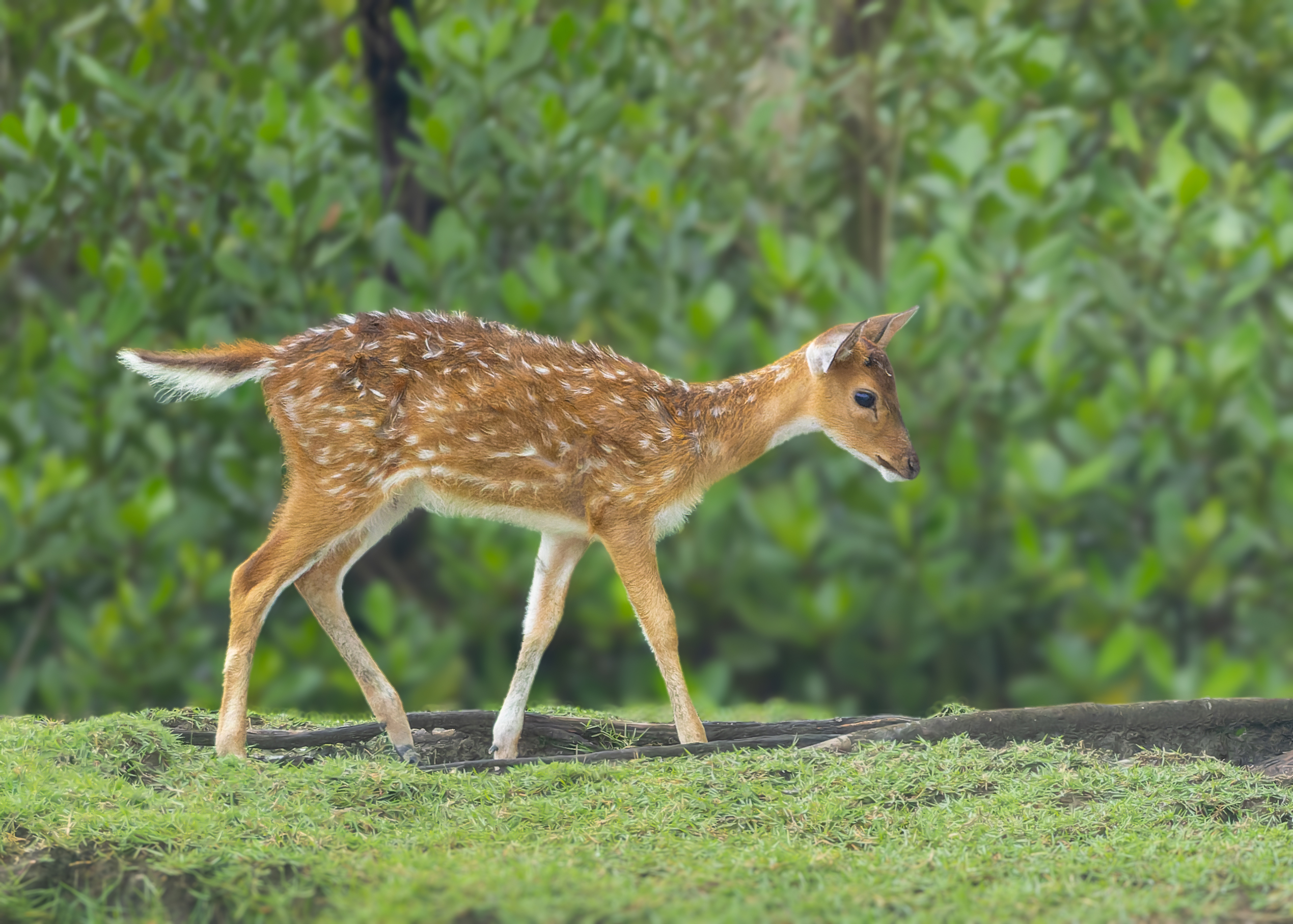
Chital fawn in Sundarbans National Park

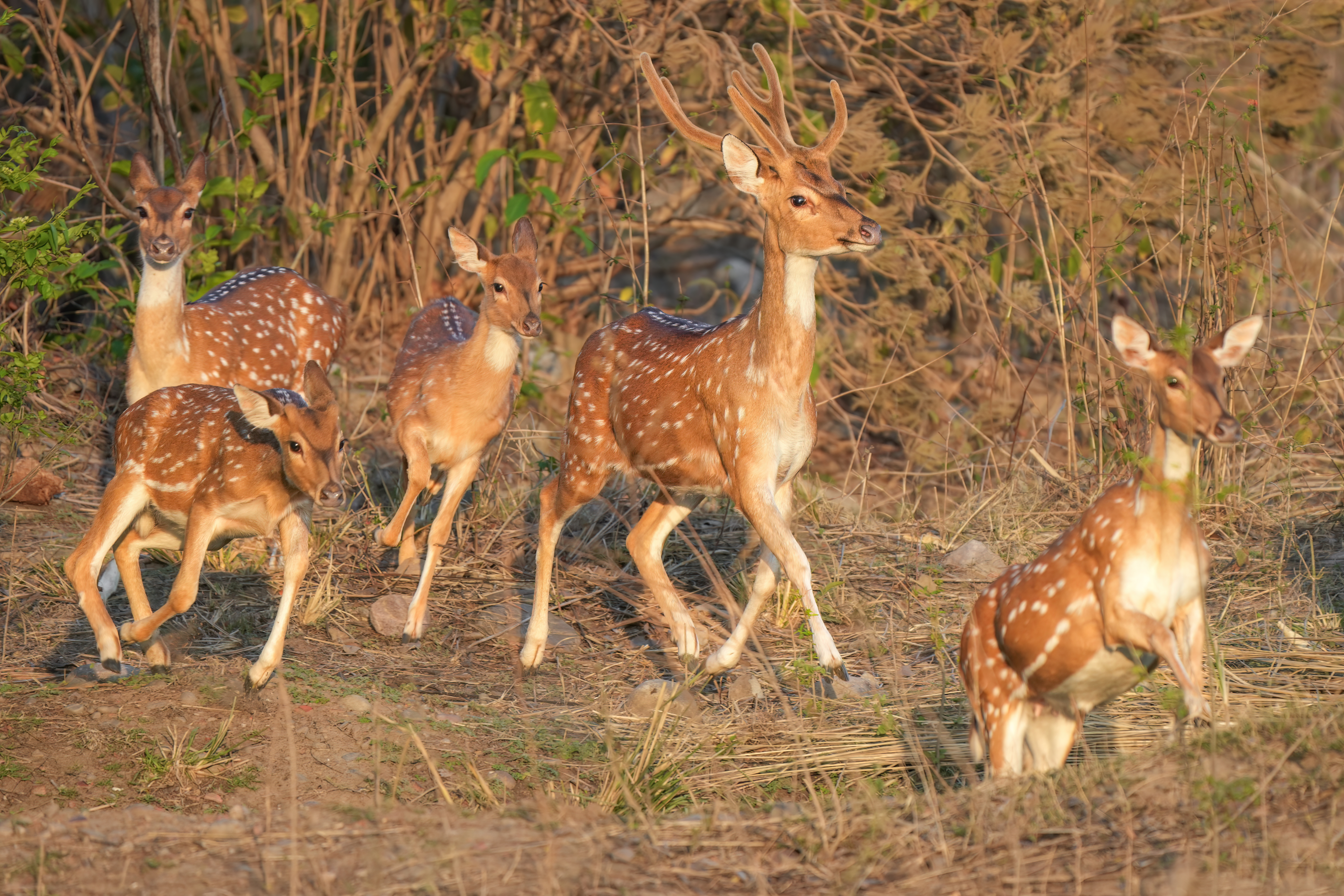
A chital herd in Jim Corbett National Park

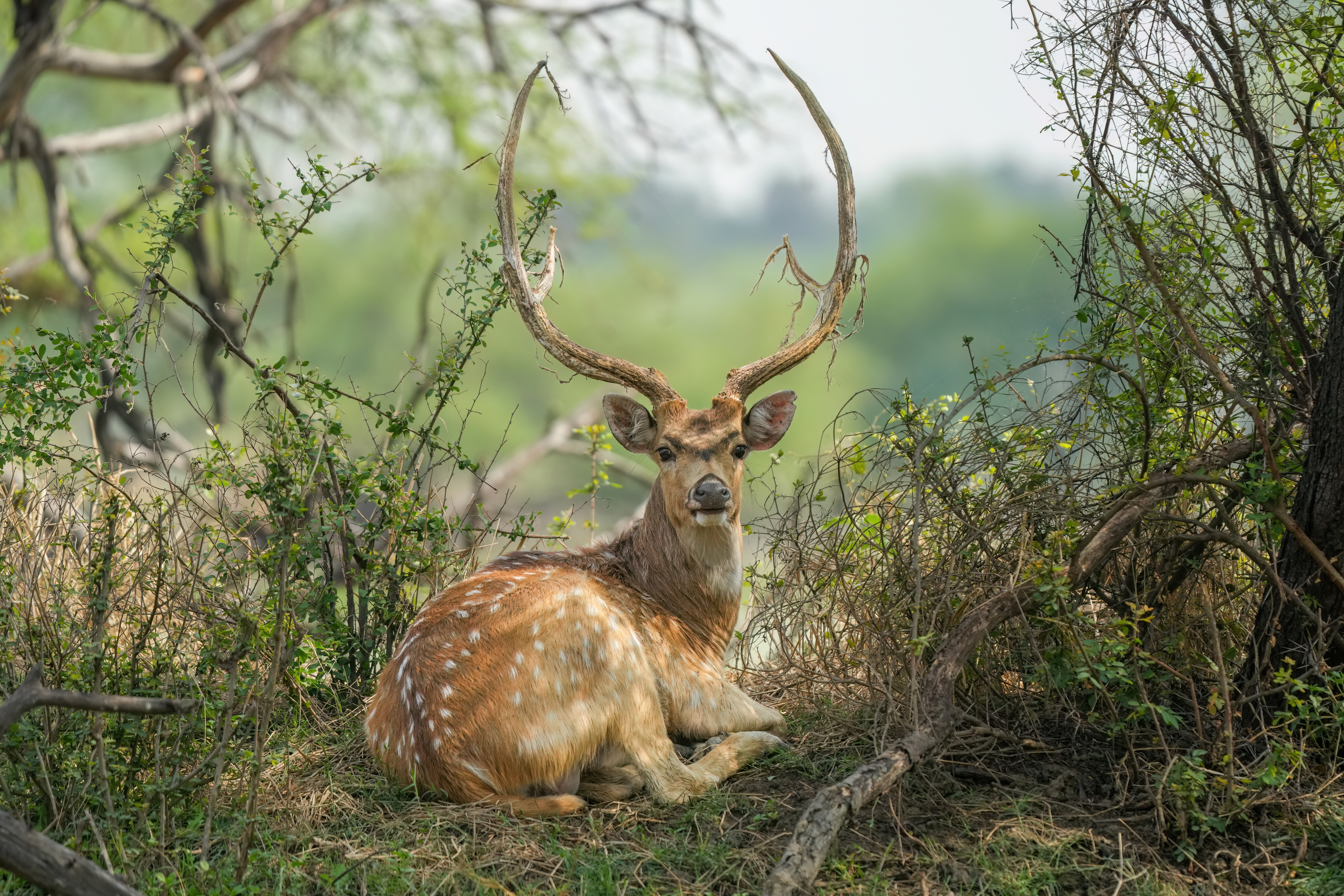
Male lying down in Keoladeo National Park

The chital ranges over 8–30°N in India, Nepal, Bhutan, Bangladesh and Sri Lanka. The western limit of its range is eastern Rajasthan and Gujarat; its northern limit is the Terai and northern West Bengal, Sikkim to western Assam and forested valleys in Bhutan below an elevation of 1,100 m (3,600 ft). It also occurs in the Sundarbans and some eco parks around the Bay of Bengal, but is locally extinct in central and north-eastern Bangladesh. The Andaman and Nicobar Islands and Sri Lanka are the southern limits of its distribution. It inhabits deciduous and semi-evergreen forests and open grasslands throughout the Indian peninsula.

=== Indonesia ===
After the British invasion of Java, Stanford Raffles moved into the Buitenzorg Palace and brought chitals from Nepal to graze the lawns. The chital population there is continuously being kept and has increased to the number of hundreds. Some chitals from the palace has also been further introduced to zoos, nature reserves, and private collections across Indonesia to alleviate overpopulation.

=== Australia ===
The chital was the first species of deer introduced into Australia in the early 1800s. While some of the stock originated from Sri Lanka, the Indian race likely is also represented.

=== United States ===
In the 1860s, chital were introduced to the island of Molokai, Hawaii, as a gift from Hong Kong to King Kamehameha V. By 2021, there were approximately 50,000 to 70,000 Axis deer on Molokai, as opposed to a human population of 7,500 people. During a drought that extended into 2021, hundreds of the deer died of starvation.

Chital were introduced to Lanai island, and soon became plentiful on both islands. Chital were introduced to Maui island in the 1950s to increase hunting opportunities. Because the chital has no natural predators on the Hawaiian islands, the population had been growing 20 to 30% each year, causing serious damage to agriculture and natural areas. To help control the excess population on Maui, a company called Maui Nui was founded in 2017 to hunt the deer and sell venison. In 2022, the company took 9,526 deer and sold 450,000 lb (200,000 kg) of venison. The deer are harvested at night using infrared technology, accompanied by a USDA representative.

Releasing them on the island of Hawaii was planned, but was abandoned after pressure from scientists over damage to landscapes caused by the chital on other islands. In 2012, chital were spotted on the island of Hawaii; wildlife officials think that people had flown them by helicopter and transported them by boat onto the island. In August 2012, a helicopter pilot pleaded guilty to transporting four chital from Maui to Hawaii. Hawaii law now prohibits "the intentional possession or interisland transportation or release of wild or feral deer."

In 1932, the chital was introduced to Texas. In 1988, self-sustaining herds were present in 27 counties in Central and South Texas. The chital is most populous on the Edwards Plateau.

=== Croatia ===
Chital of unknown origin were introduced to the islands of Brijuni in 1911. They also live on Rab Island. The population on the islands comprised about 200 individuals as of 2010. Attempts by hunters to introduce the species to the mainland of Croatia were unsuccessful.

=== Colombia ===
There have been sightings of herds of introduced chital in an interandean valley near the municipality of Puerto Triunfo in Antioquia Department.

== Behaviour and ecology ==
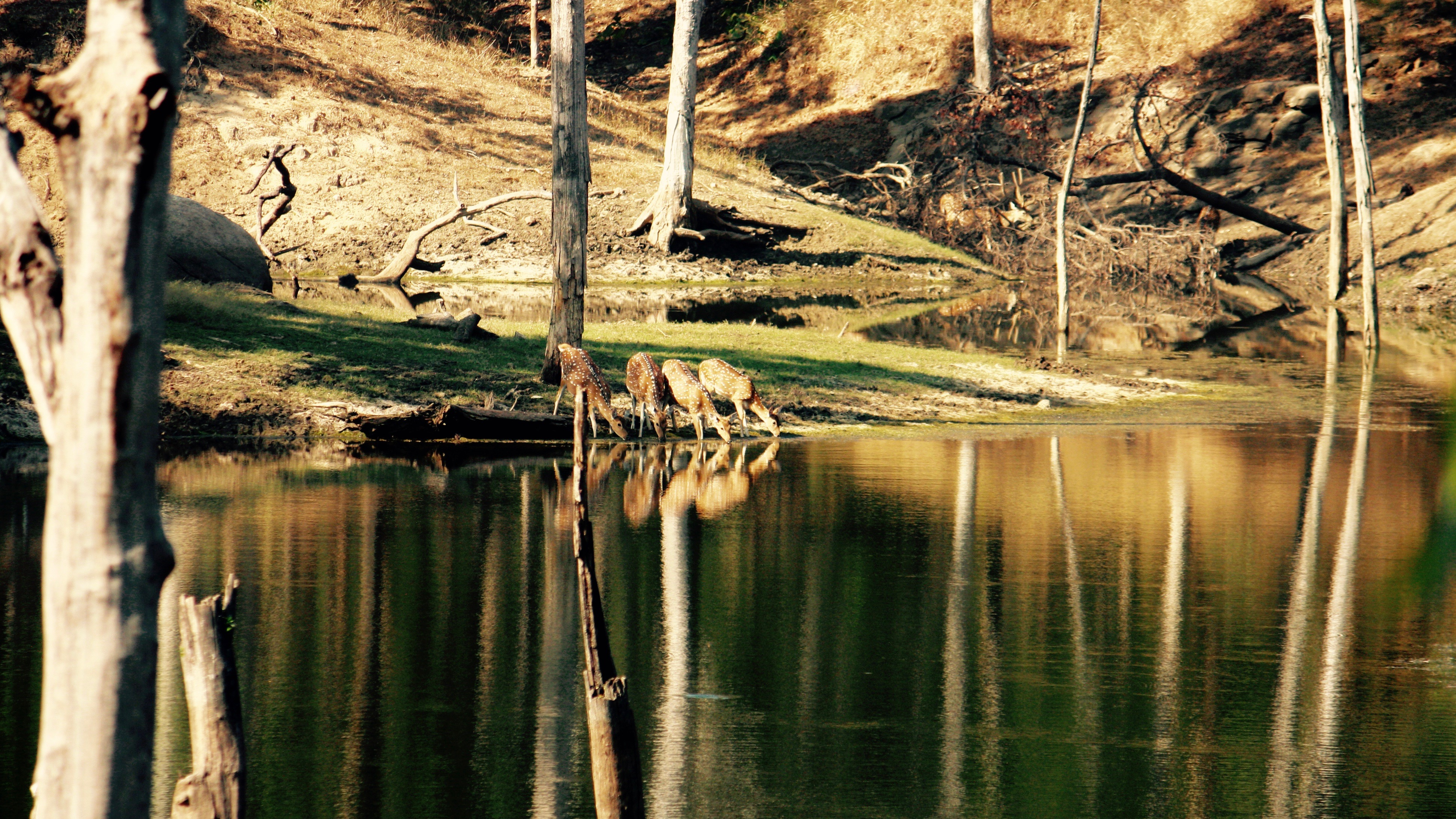
Deer herd drinking water

Chital are active throughout the day. In the summer, time is spent in rest under shade, and the sun's glare is avoided if the temperature reaches 80 °F (27 °C); activity peaks as dusk approaches. As days grow cooler, foraging begins before sunrise and peaks by early morning. Activity slows down during midday, when the animals rest or loiter about slowly. Foraging recommences by late afternoon and continues till midnight. They fall asleep a few hours before sunrise, typically in the forest which is cooler than the glades. These deer typically move in a single file on specific tracks, with a distance of two to three times their width between them, when on a journey, typically in search of food and water sources. In Gir National Park, chital travel the most in summer of all seasons. When cautiously inspecting its vicinity, the chital stands motionless and listens with rapt attention, facing the potential danger, if any. This stance may be adopted by nearby individuals, as well. As an antipredator measure, chital flee in groups (unlike the hog deer that disperse on alarm); sprints are often followed by hiding in dense undergrowth. The running chital has its tail raised, exposing the white underparts. The chital can leap and clear fences as high as 1.5 m (4 ft 11 in) but prefers to dive under them. It stays within 300 m (980 ft) of cover.

The chital forms matriarchal herds comprising an adult female and her offspring of the previous and the present year, with individuals of any age and either sex. Small herds are common, though aggregations of as many as 100 individuals have been observed. Groups are loose and disband frequently, save for the juvenile-mother herd. Herds in Texas have up to 15 members. Large herds in the Nallamala Hills with up to 40 members were observed during monsoon in grasslands. The sex ratio of herds varies seasonally, likely because to the tendency of females to isolate themselves ahead of parturition. Similarly, rutting males leave their herds during the mating season, hence altering the herd composition.

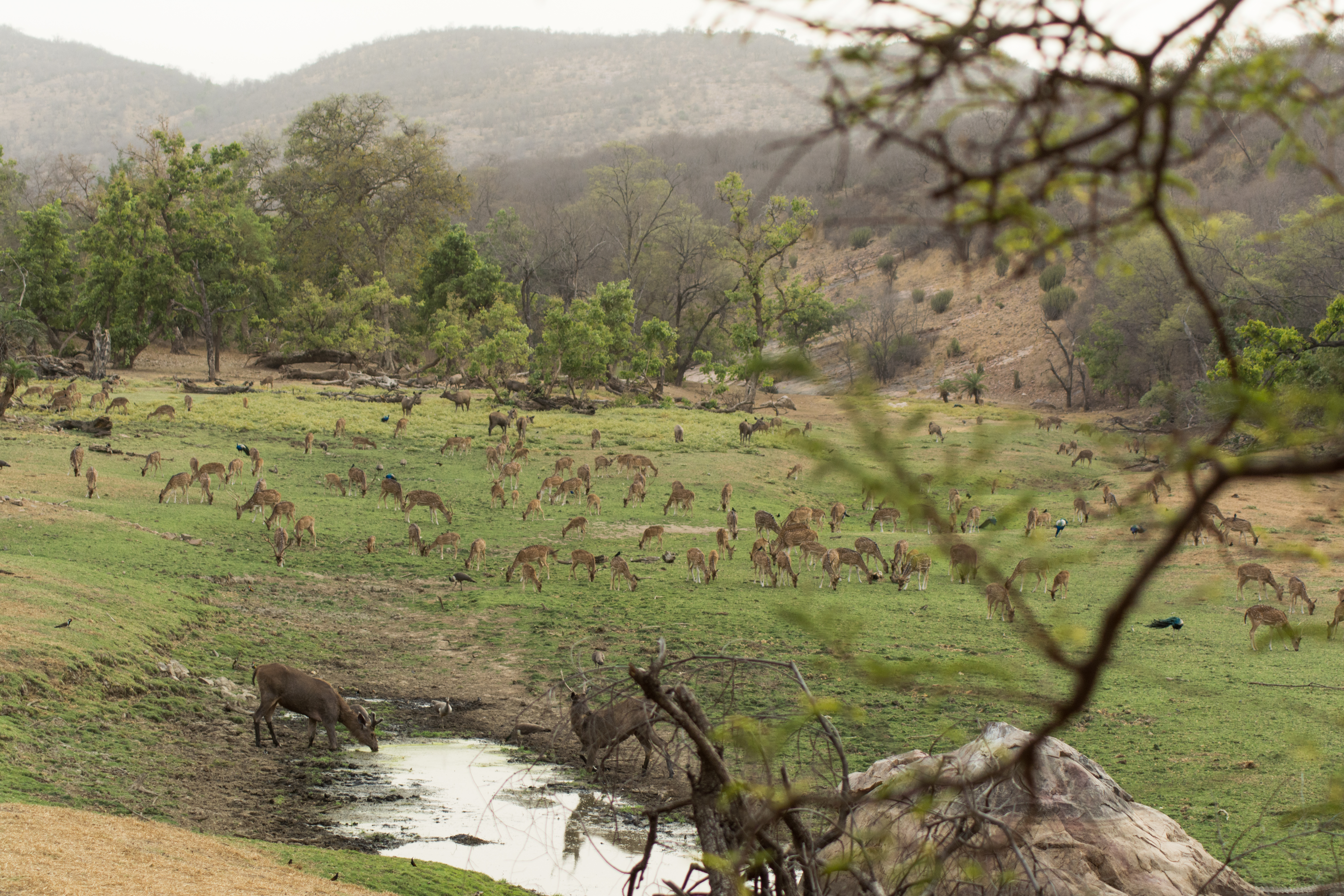
Herd of deer in Ranthambore National Park

Predators of chitals include tigers, leopards, Indian pythons, and dholes. Jungle cats, Bengal foxes and golden jackals target juveniles.

A vocal animal, the chital, akin to the North American elk, gives out bellows and alarm barks. Its calls are, however, not as strong as those of elk or red deer; they are mainly coarse bellows or loud growls. Bellowing coincides with rutting. Dominant males guarding females in oestrus make high-pitched growls at less powerful males. Males may moan during aggressive displays or while resting. Chital, mainly females and juveniles, bark persistently when alarmed or if they encounter a predator. Fawns in search of their mother often squeal. The chital can respond to the alarm calls of several animals, such as the common myna and langurs.

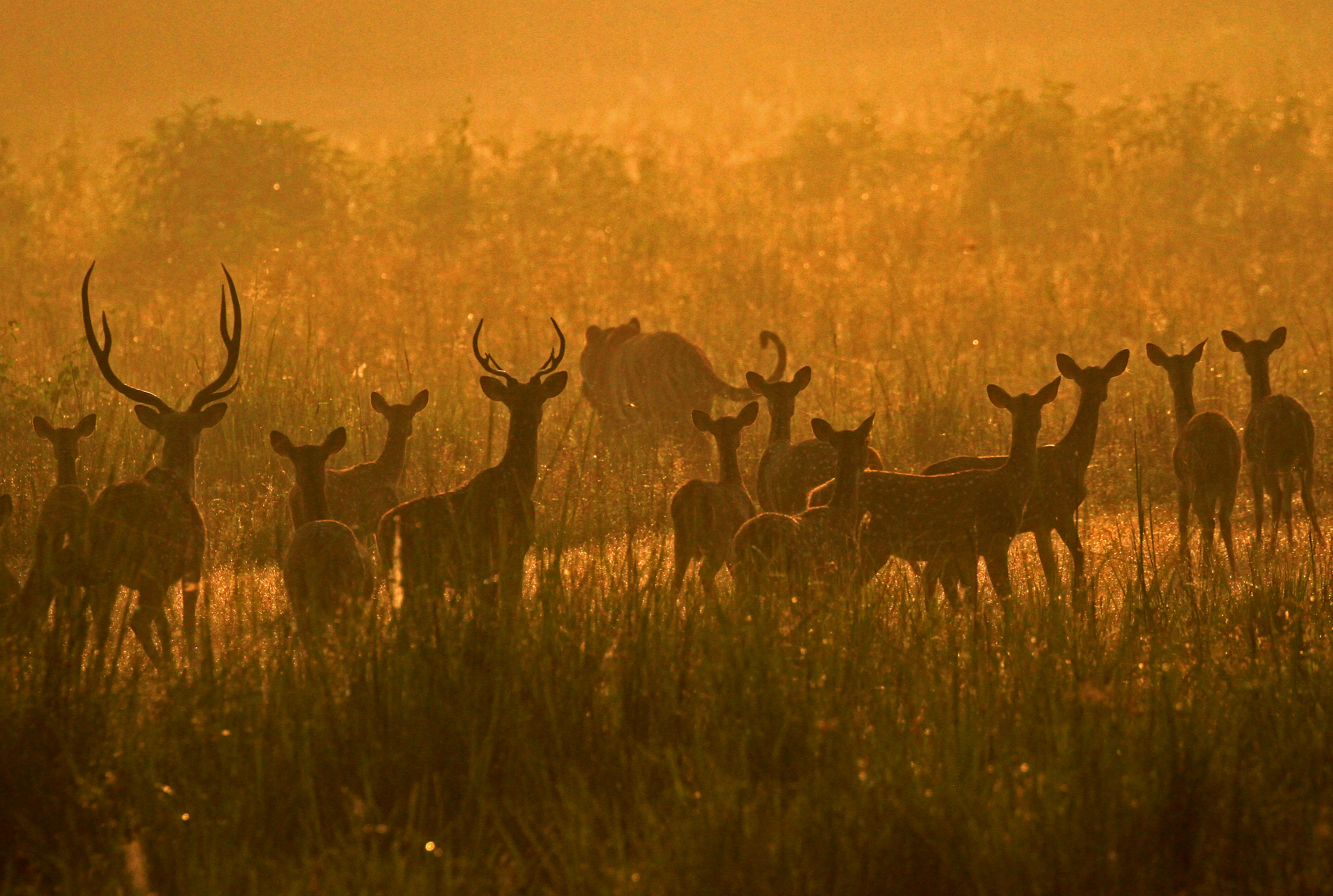
Tiger and chital in Kanha National Park

Marking behaviour is pronounced in males. Males have well-developed preorbital glands. They stand on their hind legs to reach tall branches and rub the open preorbital glands to deposit their scent there. This posture is also used while foraging. Urine marking is also observed; the smell of urine is typically stronger than that of the deposited scent. Sparring between males begins with the larger male displaying his dominance before the other; this display consists of hissing heading away from the other male with the tail facing him, the nose pointing to the ground, the ears down, the antlers upright, and the upper lip raised. The fur often bristles during the display. The male approaches the other in a slow gait. Males with velvet antlers may hunch over instead of standing erect as the males with hard antlers. The opponents then interlock their horns and push against each other, with the smaller male producing a sound at times which is louder than that produced by sambar deer, but not as much as the barasingha's. The fight terminates with the males stepping backward, or simply leaving and foraging. Fights are not generally serious.

Individuals may occasionally bite one another. Common mynas are often attracted to the chital. An interesting relationship has been observed between herds of chital and troops of the northern plains grey langur. Chital benefit from the langurs' eyesight and ability to post a lookout from trees, while the langur benefit from the chital's strong sense of smell, both of which help keep a check on potential danger. The chital also benefit from fruits dropped by langurs from trees such as Terminalia bellirica and Phyllanthus emblica. The chital has been observed foraging with sambar deer in the Western Ghats.

=== Diet ===
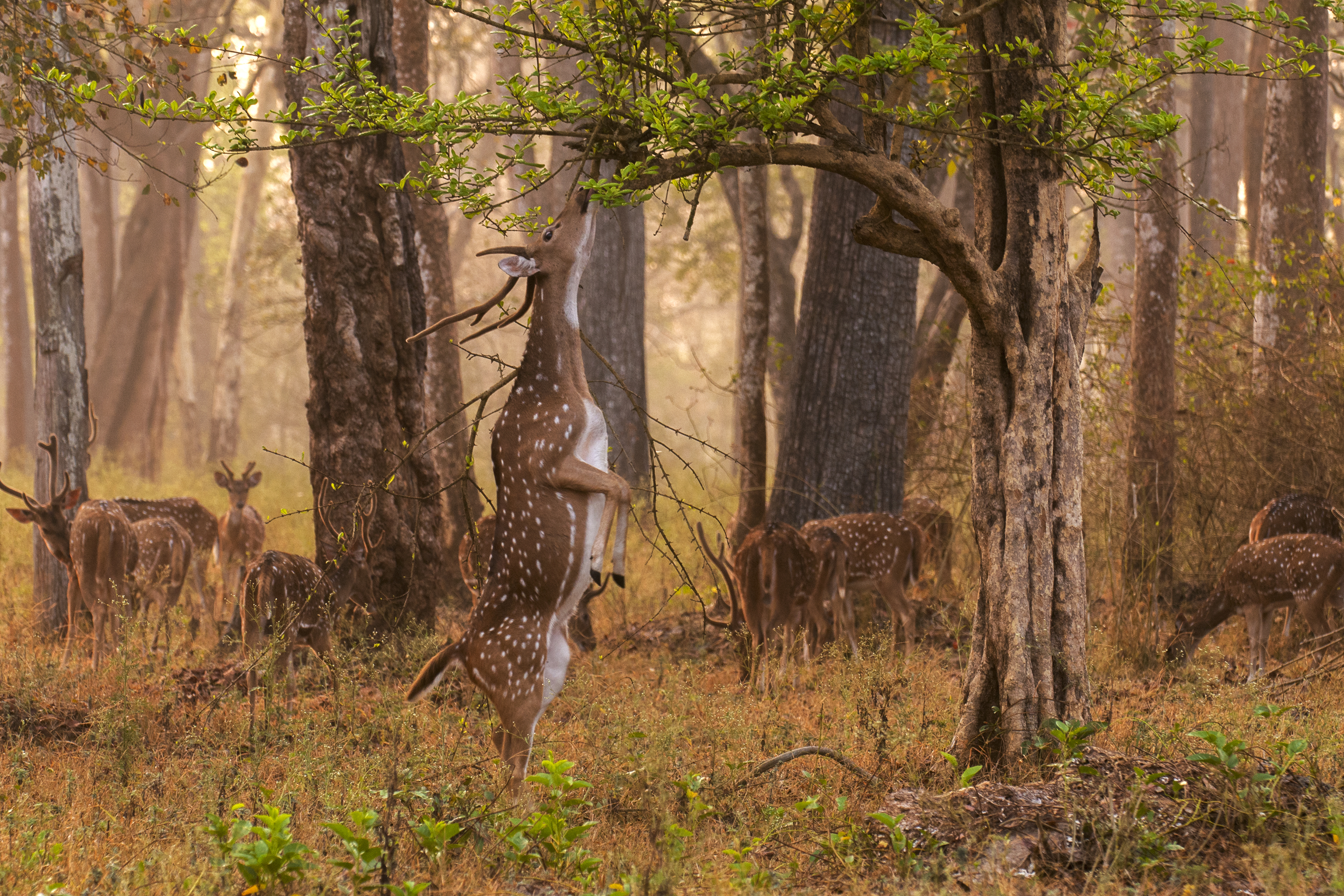
Male feeding in Nagarhole

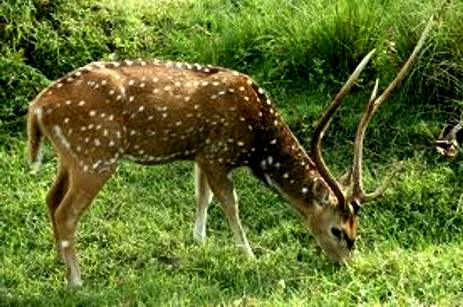
Chital grazing

Grazers as well as browsers, the chital mainly feed on grasses throughout the year. They prefer young shoots, in the absence of which, tall and coarse grasses are nibbled off at the tips. Browse forms a major portion of the diet only in the winter-October to January-when the grasses are no longer palatable. Browse includes herbs, shrubs, foliage, fruits, and forbs; Moghania species are often preferred. Fruits eaten by chital in Kanha National Park include those of Ficus species from January to May, Cordia myxa from May to June, and Syzygium cumini from June to July. Individuals tend to group together and forage while moving slowly. Chital are generally silent when grazing together. Males often stand on their hindlegs to reach tall branches. Water holes are visited nearly twice daily, with great caution. In the Kanha National Park, mineral licks rich in calcium and phosphorus pentoxide were scraped at by the incisors. Chital also gnaw bones and fallen antlers for their minerals. Males in velvet indulge in such osteophagia to a greater extent. Christmas Island red crab remains found in the rumen of chitals in the Sunderbans indicate that they may be omnivores.

=== Reproduction ===
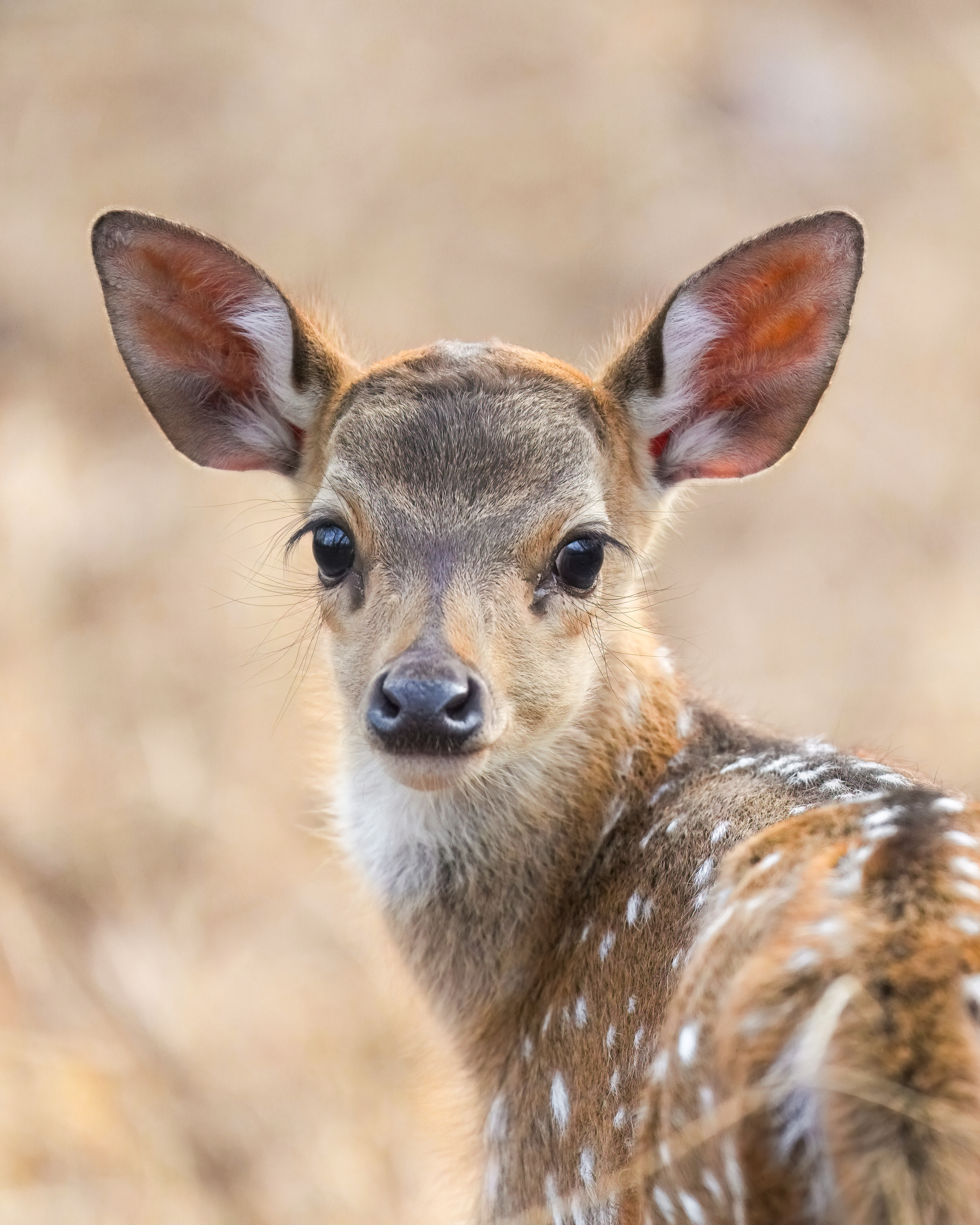
Newborn in Ranthambore National Park

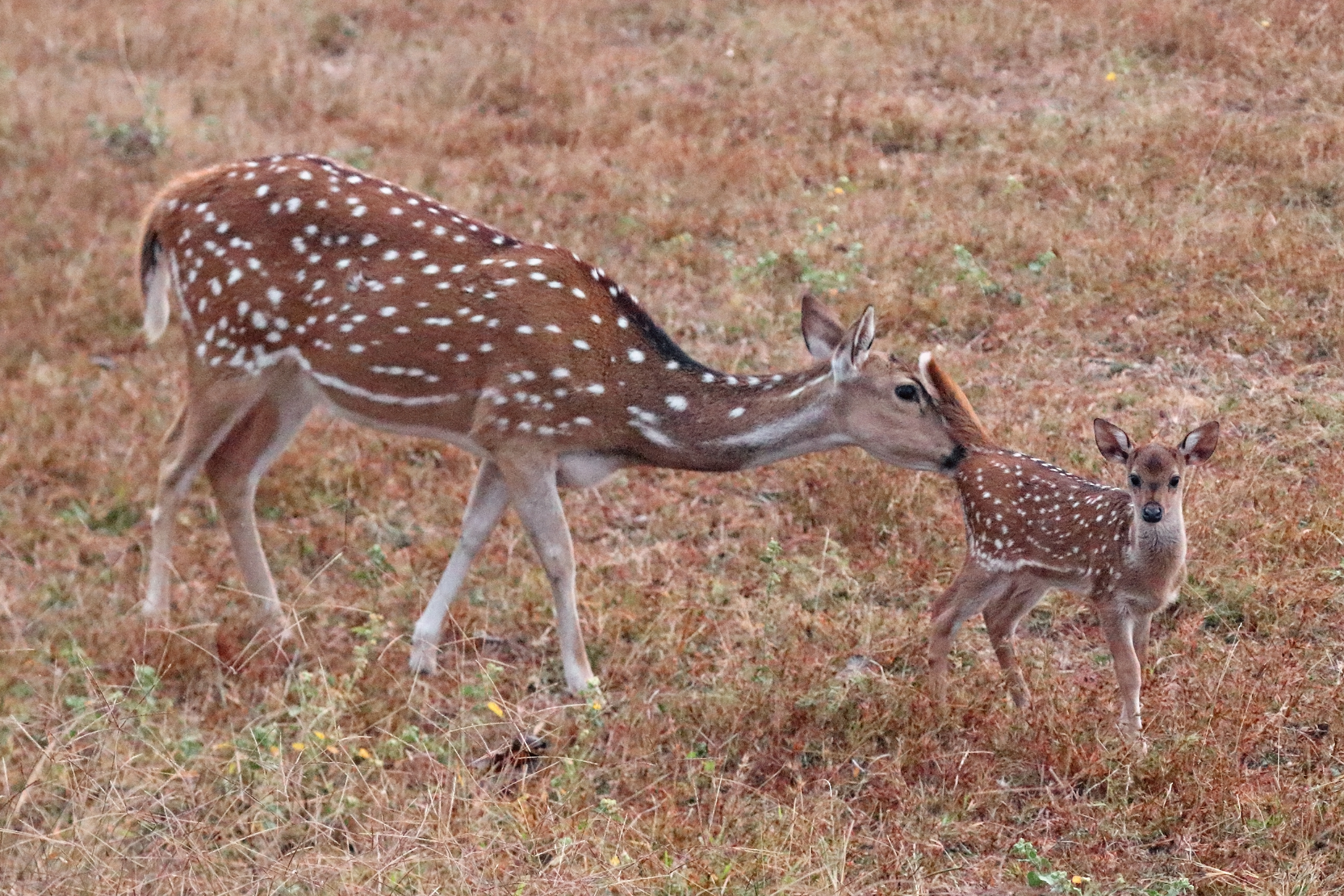
Female with newborn

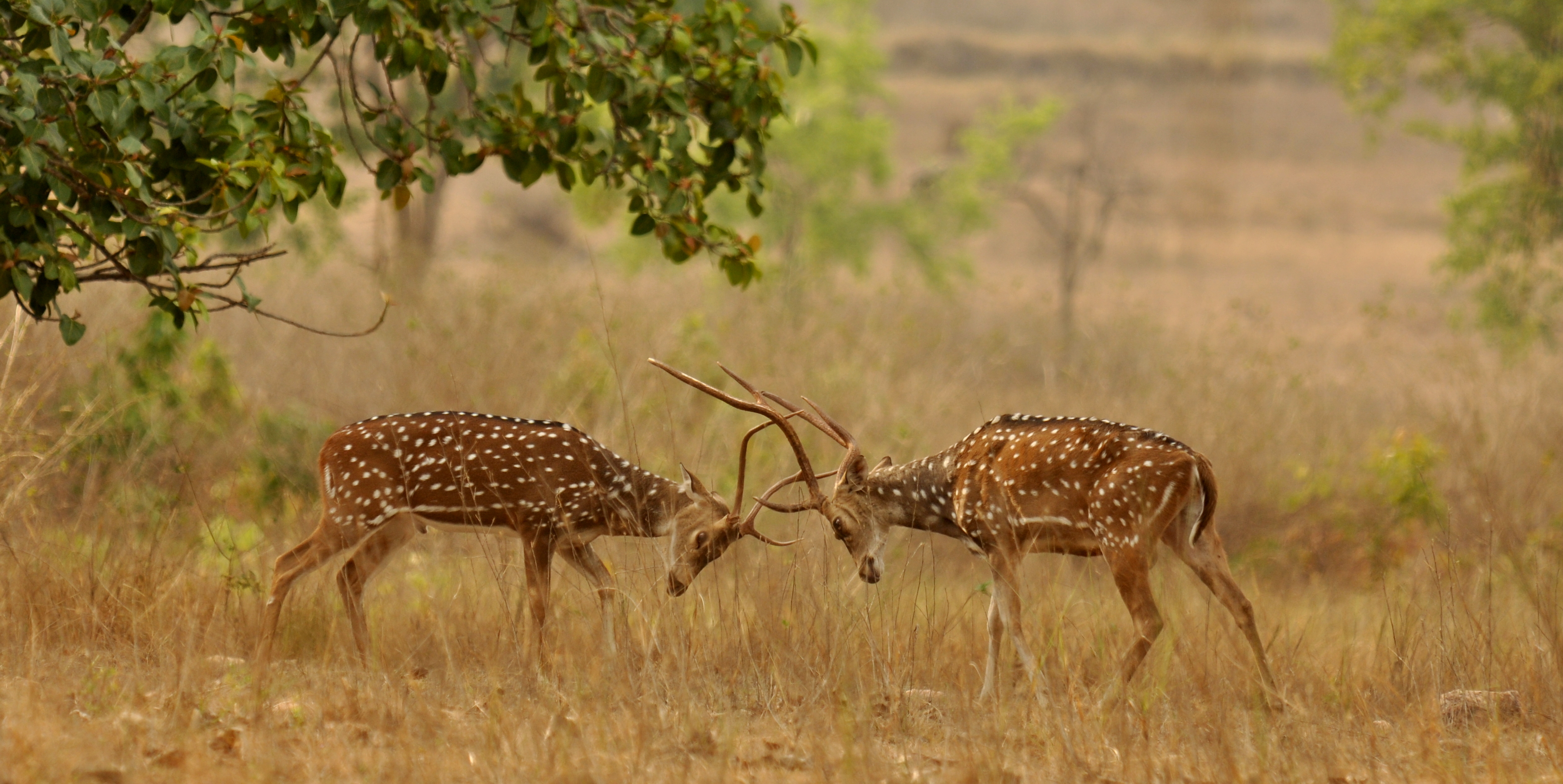
Chital bucks sparring

Breeding takes place throughout the year, with peaks that vary geographically. Sperm is produced year-round, though testosterone levels register a fall during the development of the antlers. Females have regular oestrus cycles, each lasting three weeks. The female can conceive again 2 to 16 weeks after the birth. Males sporting hard antlers are dominant over those in velvet or those without antlers, irrespective of their size. Courtship is based on tending bonds. A rutting male fasts during the mating season while following and guarding a female in heat. The pair engage in several bouts of chasing and mutual grooming before copulation.

The newborn is hidden for a week after birth, a period much shorter than most other deer. The mother-fawn bond is not very strong, as the two get separated often, though they can reunite easily as the herds are cohesive. If the fawn dies, the mother can breed once again so as to give birth twice that year. The males continue their growth till seven to eight years. The average lifespan in captivity is nearly 22 years. The longevity in the wild, however, is merely five to ten years; due to predation and competition.

== Conservation status ==
The chital is listed on the IUCN Red List as least concern "because it occurs over a very wide range within which there are many large populations". Currently, no range-wide threats to chitals are present, and they live in many protected areas. However, population densities are below ecological carrying capacity in many places due to hunting and competition with domestic livestock. Hunting for the deer's meat has caused substantial declines and local extinctions. The axis deer is protected under Schedule III of the Indian Wildlife Protection Act (1972) and under the Wildlife (Preservation) (Amendment) Act, 1974 of Bangladesh. Two primary reasons for its good conservation status are its legal protection as a species and a network of functioning protected areas.

The chital has been introduced to the Andaman Islands, Argentina, Australia, Brazil, Chile, Mexico, Paraguay, Uruguay, Alabama, Point Reyes National Seashore in California, Florida, Hawaii, Mississippi, and Texas in the United States. In 1911, it was brought to the acclimatisation station for European zoos at Brijuni Islands in Croatia; it was introduced to Rab and Dugi Otok islands in 1974 and 2012, respectively.

With effect of 2 August 2022, the European Union added the chital to the List of invasive alien species of Union concern and banned its import.

== See also ==
- Sri Lankan axis deer
