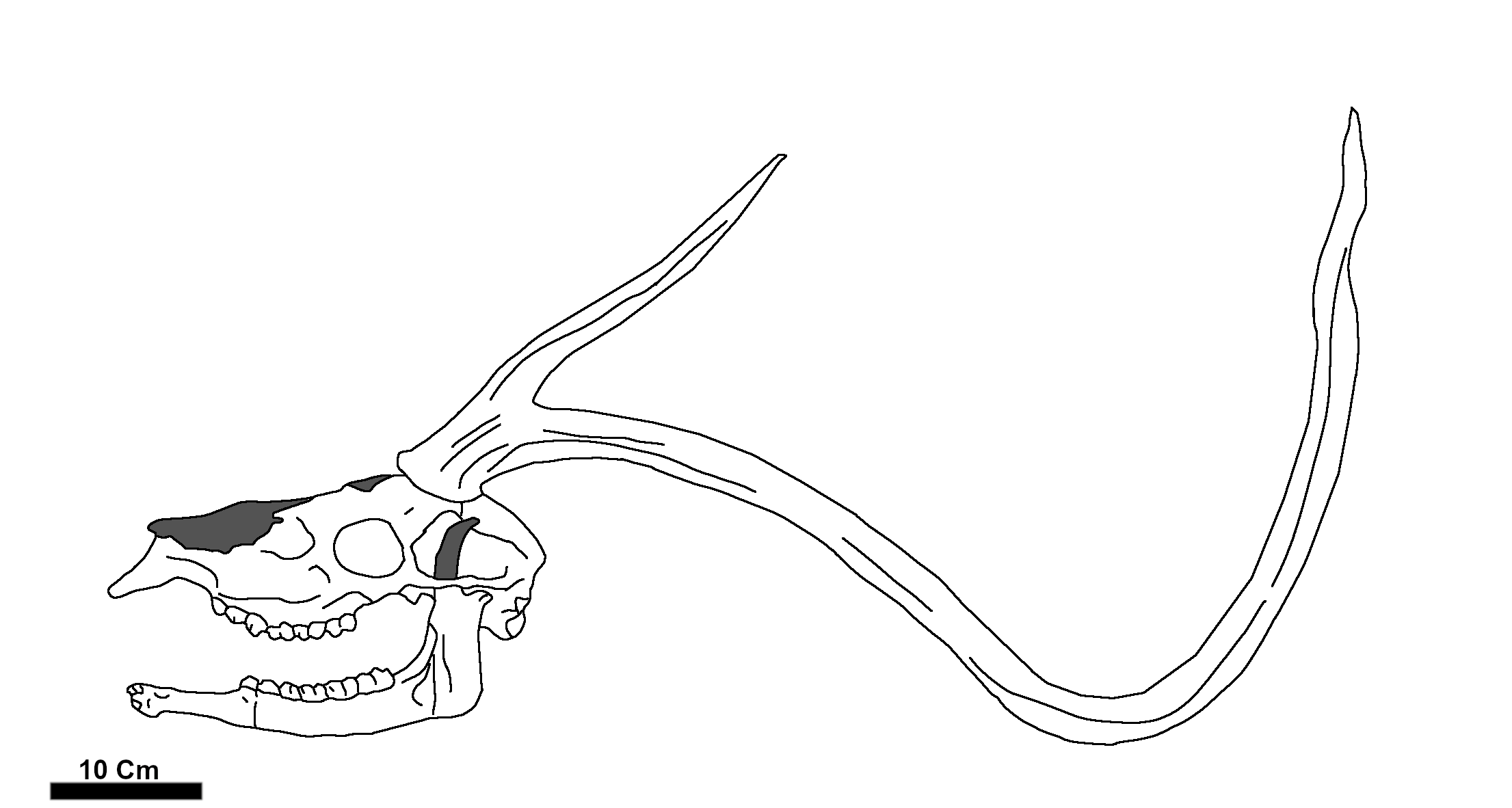

Scientific classification
- Kingdom: Animalia
- Phylum: Chordata
- Class: Mammalia
- Infraclass: Placentalia
- Order: Artiodactyla
- Family: Cervidae
- Genus: †Haploidoceros; Croitor, Bonifay & Brugal, 2008
- Species: †H. mediterraneus

Binomial name
- †Haploidoceros mediterraneus Bonifay, 1967

Synonyms
- Euctenoceros mediterraneus

= Haploidoceros =

Haploidoceros Temporal range: Middle Pleistocene–Late Pleistocene

Extinct genus of deer

Haploidoceros is an extinct genus of deer that lived in Europe from the late Middle Pleistocene to early Late Pleistocene. It contains a single species, Haploidoceros mediterraneus. It had a distribution limited to southern France and the Iberian Peninsula.

== Taxonomy ==
Haploidoceros was described in 2008. Its remains were originally assigned to the genus Euctenoceros (now usually synonymous with Eucladoceros), though examination of the cranial proportions and morphology show it is distinct. Analysis of its antlers has led some authors to suggest that it descended from the genus Arvernoceros, which is closely related and sometimes considered a subgenus of Rucervus, which contains the living barasinga.

== Description ==
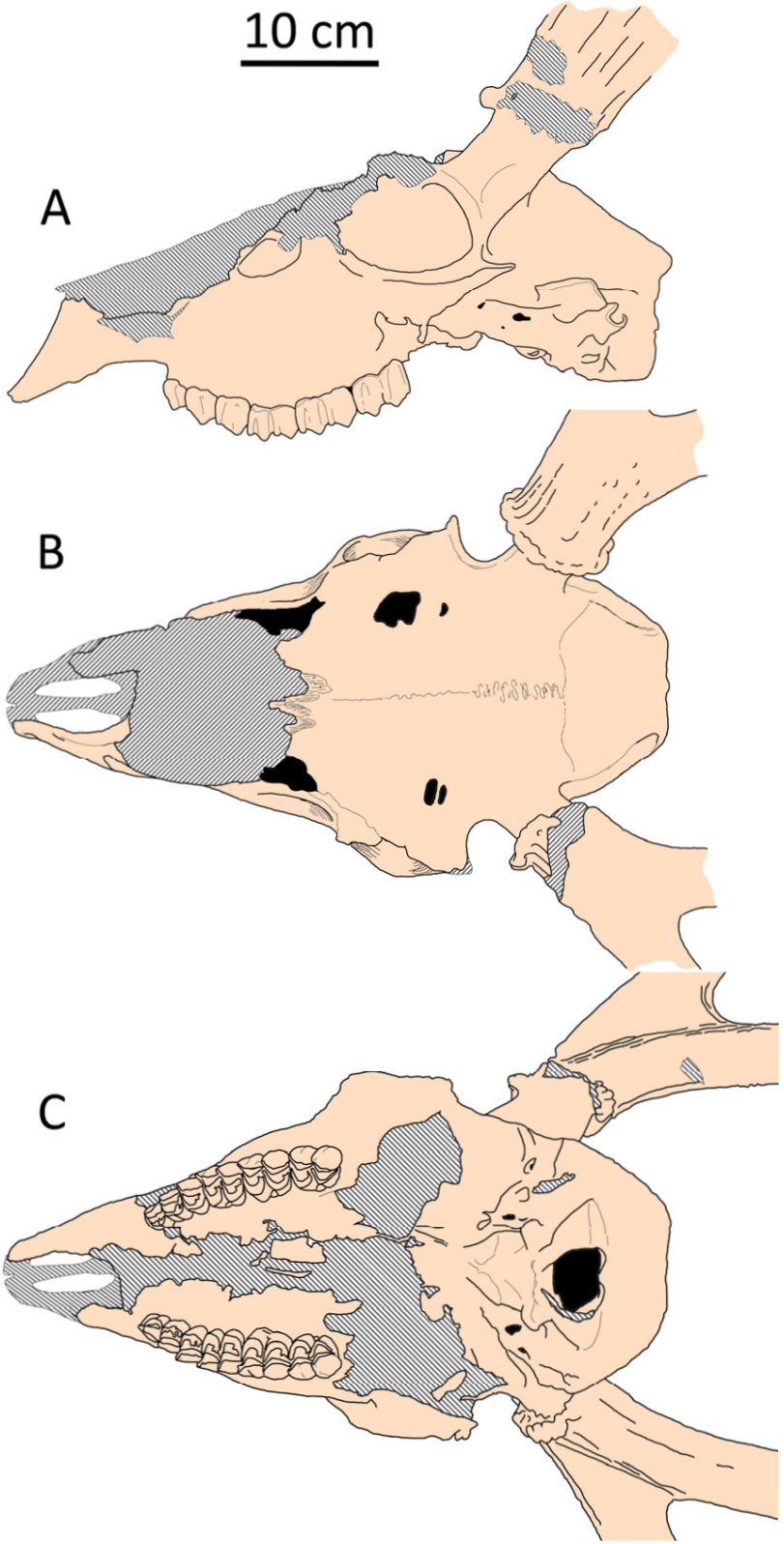
Skull in various views

Haploidoceros was a medium-sized deer weighing around 70–80 kg (150–180 lb). Its hind limbs were especially well-developed, indicating it was a good jumper who possibly moved in a bounding gait. Its unique antlers were split into two beams adorned with a single tip at the end. The posterior beam was sickle-shaped, while the front beam was comparatively shorter and straighter.

== Paleoecology ==
Haploidoceros favored temperate climates. It probably lived in forests to semi-open woodland. Tooth wear (both dental microwear and mesowear) analysis suggests that it was a mixed feeder (both grazing and browsing), with a preference for browsing on leaves, similar to that of living European fallow deer (Dama dama), shifting from browse dominated mixed feeding during the Middle Pleistocene to browsing during the Late Pleistocene. It lived alongside a variety of other ungulates, such as equids, rhinoceroses, wild boar, aurochs and the straight-tusked elephant.

Sites containing fossils of Haploidoceros mediterraneus are notable in their absence of fallow deer remains, despite the species being common in other nearby sites in the time period. It is believed that the niches of these deer were too similar for both to occupy the same area. Both species avoided competition by choosing different habitats; Haploidoceros favoring woodland and the fallow deer staying in more open areas.

== Extinction ==
The oldest Haploidoceros remains are from the late Middle Pleistocene, dated to 400–300,000 years ago. The youngest remains are from Cova del Rinoceront in Spain, dating to the early Late Pleistocene, between 74 and 130,000 years ago. Its extinction may have been due to competition with recently arrived fallow deer, along with climate change following the onset of the Last Glacial Period.
