= Maladera barasingha =

Scientific classification
- Kingdom: Animalia
- Phylum: Arthropoda
- Class: Insecta
- Order: Coleoptera
- Suborder: Polyphaga
- Infraorder: Scarabaeiformia
- Family: Scarabaeidae
- Genus: Maladera
- Species: M. barasingha

Binomial name
- Maladera barasingha Gupta, Bhunia, Ahrens & Chandra, 2025

Species of beetle

Maladera barasingha is a species of beetle of the family Scarabaeidae. It is found in India (Manipur).

== Description ==
Adults reach a length of about 8.6 mm. They have a dark reddish brown, oval body. They are mostly dull (but the labroclypeus is shiny) and nearly glabrous, except for some single setae on the head dorsal surface.

== Etymology ==
The species is named after the India swamp deer (Rucervus duvaucelii) because the aedeagus resembles the antler of this animal.
