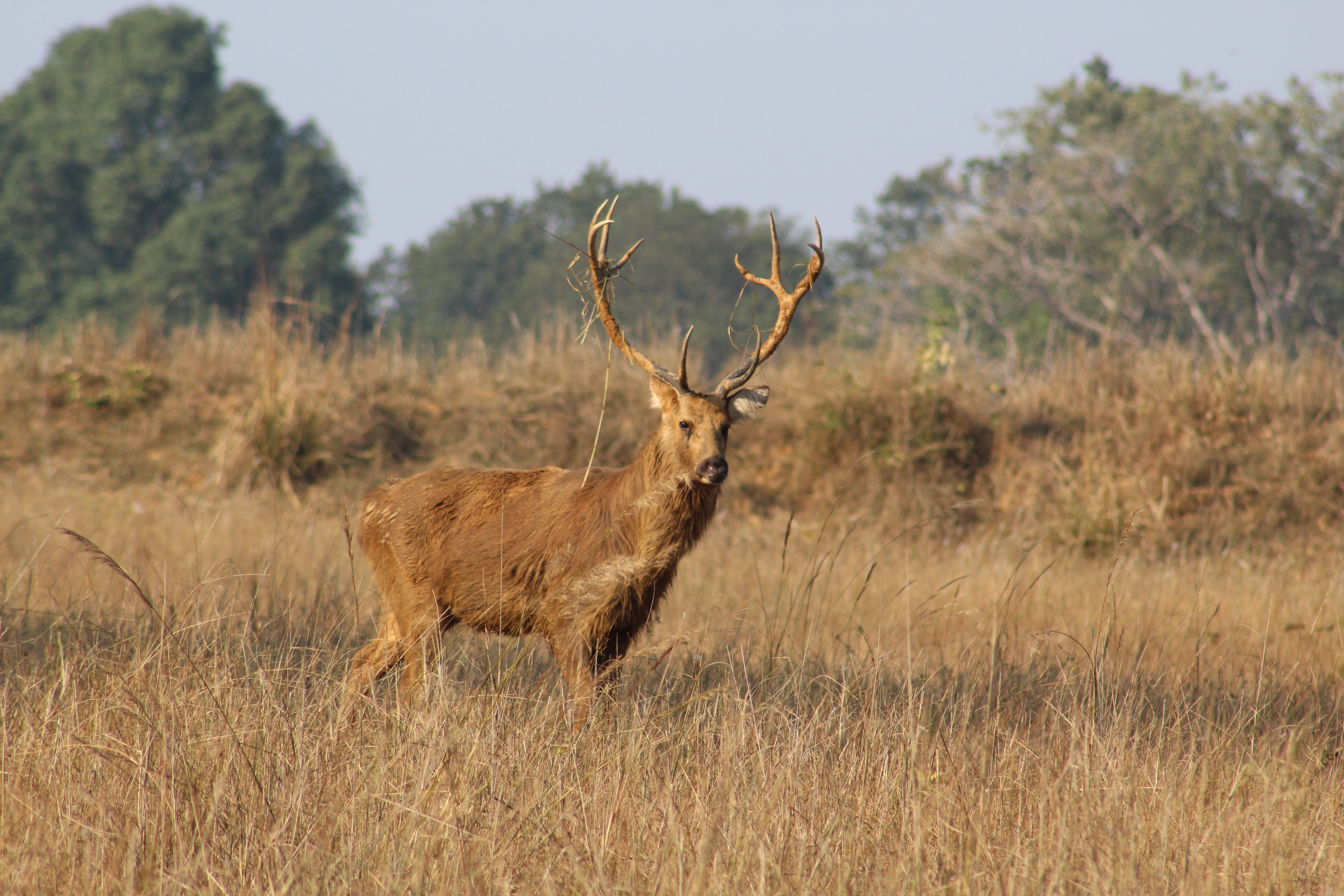
- Barasingha stag

Scientific classification
- Kingdom: Animalia
- Phylum: Chordata
- Class: Mammalia
- Order: Artiodactyla
- Family: Cervidae
- Tribe: Cervini
- Genus: Rucervus; Hodgson, 1838

Type species
- Cervus duvaucelii (Cuvier, 1823)

Species
- See text

= Rucervus =

Genus of deer native to Asia

Rucervus is a genus of deer from India, Nepal, Indochina, and the Chinese island of Hainan. The only extant representatives, the barasingha or swamp deer (R. duvaucelii) and Eld's deer (R. eldii), are threatened by habitat loss and hunting; another species, Schomburgk’s deer (R. schomburgki), went extinct in 1938. Deer species found within the genus Rucervus are characterized by a specific antler structure, where the basal ramification is often supplemented with an additional small prong, and the middle tine is never present. The crown tines are inserted on the posterior side of the beam and may be bifurcated or fused into a small palmation.

== Species ==
=== Recent species ===
Genus Rucervus – Hodgson, 1838 – three species
Common name	Scientific name and subspecies	Range	Size and ecology	IUCN status and estimated population
Barasingha, swamp deer	Rucervus duvaucelii (Cuvier, 1823) Three subspecies: R. d. duvauceli (Cuvier, 1823); R. d. branderi (Pocock 1943); R. d. ranjitsinhi (Grooves 1982)	Northern and central India and southwestern Nepal	Size: Habitat: Diet:	VU
Eld's deer, brow-antlered deer, thamin	Rucervus eldii (McClelland, 1842) Three subspecies: R. e. eldii; R. e. thamin; R. e. siamensis	South Asia and Southeast Asia	Size: Habitat: Diet:	EN
Schomburgk’s deer	Rucervus schomburgki (Blyth, 1863)	Thailand	Size: Habitat: Diet:	EX

=== Fossil species ===
- †Rucervus ardei (Croizet & Jobert, 1828) (Pliocene, France)
- †Rucervus colberti (Azzaroli, 1954) (Tertiary, Sivalik Hills)
- †Rucervus gigans Croitor, 2018 (Early Pleistocene, Greece)
- †Rucervus giulii (Kahlke, 1997) (Early Pleistocene, Germany)
- †Rucervus radulescui Croitor, 2018 (Early Pleistocene, Romania)
- †Rucervus simplicidens (Lydekker, 1876) (Tertiary, Sivalik Hills)
- †Rucervus verestchagini (David, 1992) (Early Pleistocene, Moldova)

According to the old tradition of zoological taxonomy, swamp deer originally were regarded as members of the genus Cervus. Rucervus was originally proposed by Hodgson as a subgenus of the genus Cervus. The original definition of Rucervus was mostly based on antler shape believed to be intermediate between that of 'elaphus' and 'hippelaphus'. Hodgson reported that upper canines are present only in males of barasingha, but the additional craniological material shows that upper canines are present in both sexes. Eld's deer was regarded as another species of the genus Rucervus, however, the recent genetic evidences suggest that Eld's deer is most closely related to Père David's deer and should be placed in its own genus, Panolia. However, it has recently been place back into Rucervus by the American Society of Mammalogists despite Eld's deer is not closely related to barasingha in genetics and antler structure.

The generic name derives from its resemblance to both Rusa and Cervus.

Rucervus is an ancient cervid lineage that—together with the genus Axis—represents the oldest evolutionary radiation of the subfamily Cervinae (plesiometacarpal deer).

== Paleontological record ==
The fossil species of Rucervus of Europe were included in the genus Arvernoceros Heintz, 1971 (the type species: Cervus ardei Croizet & Jobert, 1828) or in the genus Eucladoceros, as in the case of R. giulii. Today, Arvernoceros is regarded as a subgenus of Rucervus. The European fossil forms of Rucervus are distinguished from the South Asian species by more compact crown part of the antler and by the frequent development of a small distal palmation as for instance in R. ardei and R. radulescui. South Asian fossil forms of Rucervus are represented by large-sized R. simplicidens and R. colberti. The late Early Pleistocene of Greece has yielded the remains of a giant species R. gigans that rivaled Irish elk Megaloceros giganteus in size. The giant Rucervus from Greece is distinguished by unusually long limbs for such a large animal, and is apparently closely related to R. simplicidens and R. colberti from the Sivaliks. The Southwest-Europe endemic Mid to early Late Pleistocene genus Haploidoceros is regarded as closely allied.
