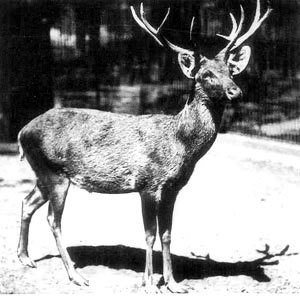
- Specimen in Berlin Zoo, 1911

Conservation status
- Extinct (1938) (IUCN 3.1)

Scientific classification
- Kingdom: Animalia
- Phylum: Chordata
- Class: Mammalia
- Infraclass: Placentalia
- Order: Artiodactyla
- Family: Cervidae
- Genus: Rucervus
- Species: †R. schomburgki

Binomial name
- †Rucervus schomburgki Blyth, 1863

Synonyms
- Cervus schomburgki (Blyth, 1863)

= Schomburgk's deer =

Schomburgk's deer Temporal range: Holocene

Extinct species of deer

The Schomburgk's deer (Rucervus schomburgki), known locally as the saman (Thai: สมัน) or the birdcage-horned deer (Thai: กวางเขาสุ่ม), is an extinct species of deer once endemic to central Thailand. It was described by Edward Blyth in 1863 and named after Sir Robert H. Schomburgk, who was the British consul in Bangkok from 1857 to 1864. It is thought to have gone extinct by 1938, when the last records of the species were published.

== Description ==
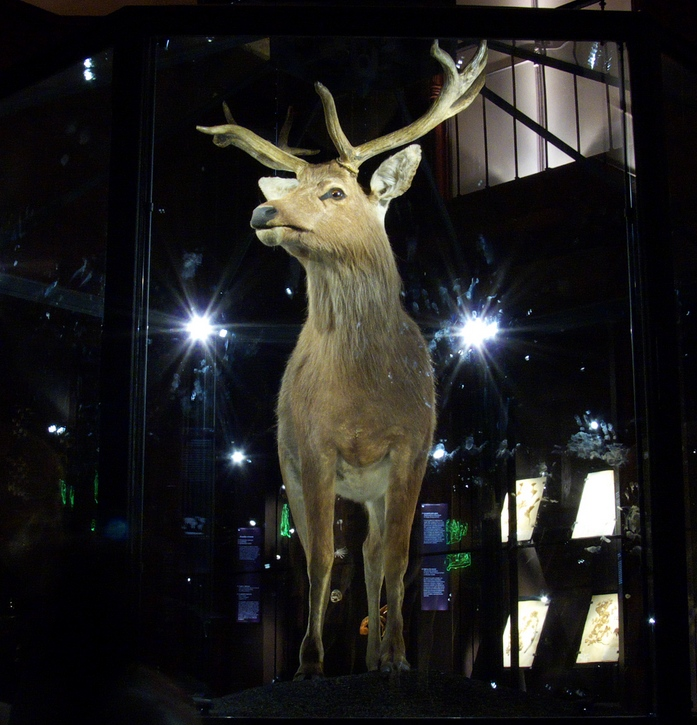
The only mounted Schomburgk's deer specimen in the world, on display at the Muséum national d'histoire naturelle.

This deer was similar in appearance to the related barasingha (R. duvaucelii). The pelt was a dark brown with lighter underparts. The underside of the tail was white. Males possessed basket-like antlers, upon which all the main tines branched. This caused the deer to have up to 33 points on their antlers and the outer edge of the rack to be up to 35 inches (90 cm) long. Little is known about females of the species, beyond that they did not have antlers.

== Habitat ==
Schomburgk's deer inhabited swampy plains with long grass, cane, and shrubs in central Thailand, particularly in the Chao Phraya River valley near Bangkok. This deer avoided dense vegetation. They lived in herds that consisted of a single adult male, a few females, and their young. However, during the flooding that occurred during the rainy season, the herds were forced together upon higher pieces of land which could turn into islands. This made them easy targets for hunters.

== Extinction ==
Commercial production of rice for export began in the late-19th century in Thailand, leading to the loss of nearly all grassland and swamp areas on which this deer depended. Intensive hunting pressure at the turn of the century restricted the species further until it became extinct. The wild population of Schomburgk's deer is thought to have died out because of overhunting by 1932, with the last captive individual, an animal living at a temple in Samut Sakhon, being killed in 1938 by a drunk man.

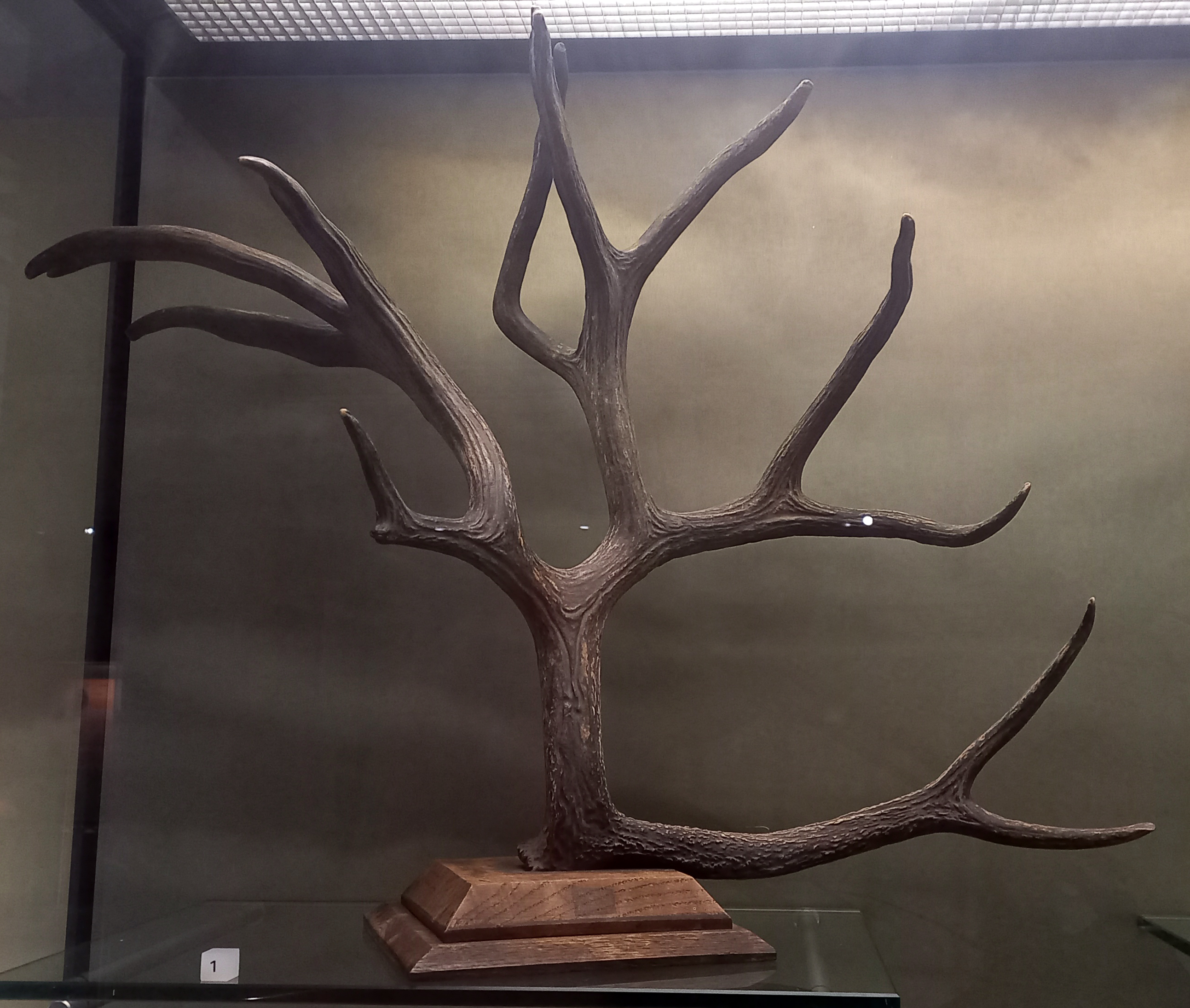
Antler in National Museum of Scotland

The species was listed as extinct in the 2006 IUCN Red List of Threatened Species, however some scientists consider this species to still be extant.

Evidence for the continued survival of the Schomburgk's deer came in February of 1991 when Laurent Chazée, an agronomist with the United Nations, photographed a set of antlers on display in a Chinese medicine shop, located in the Phongsali province of Laos. Given the antlers' unique, basket-like shape, Chazée identified them as belonging to a Schomburgk's deer, and further analysis of the antlers through Chazée's photos showed they had come from a recently killed animal.

Only one mounted specimen is known to exist, which currently resides in the Muséum national d'Histoire naturelle in Paris, France, after living in a zoo there until 1868.

The species is one of the original eight species to be introduced into the Reserved wild animals of Thailand list in 1960, and it is the only one to have already went extinct. The species' inclusion is meant to prohibit the possession or trading of its remains.

== See also ==
- List of extinct animals of Asia
