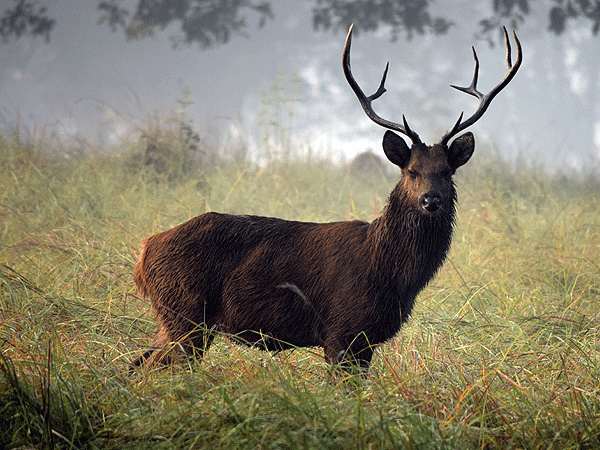
- Male
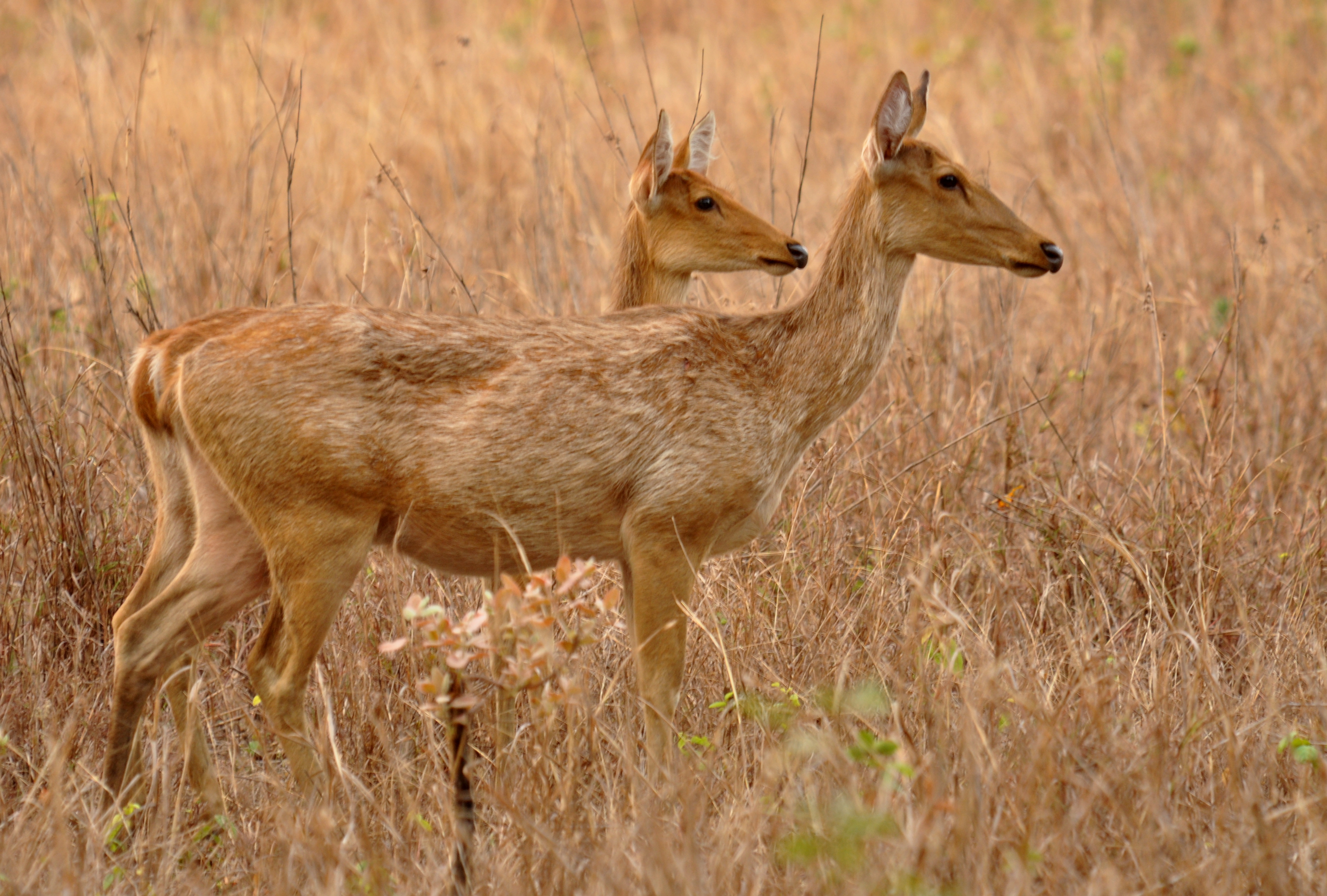
- Adult female and yearling

Conservation status
- Vulnerable (IUCN 3.1)
- CITES Appendix I

Scientific classification
- Kingdom: Animalia
- Phylum: Chordata
- Class: Mammalia
- Order: Artiodactyla
- Family: Cervidae
- Genus: Rucervus
- Species: R. duvaucelii

Binomial name
- Rucervus duvaucelii (G. Cuvier, 1823)
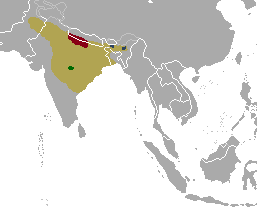
- Historic range (yellow); relict populations: duvaucelii (red); branderi (green); ranjitsinhi (blue)
- Current distribution with subspecies marked

= Barasingha =

Species of deer

The barasingha (Rucervus duvaucelii), sometimes barasinghe, also known as the swamp deer, is a deer species distributed in the Indian subcontinent. Populations in northern and central India are fragmented, and two isolated populations occur in southwestern Nepal. It has been extirpated in Pakistan and Bangladesh, and its presence is uncertain in Bhutan.

The specific name commemorates the French naturalist Alfred Duvaucel.

The swamp deer differs from all other Indian deer species in that the antlers carry more than three tines. Because of this distinctive character it is designated bārah-singgā, meaning "twelve-horned" in Hindi. Mature stags usually have 10 to 14 tines, and some have been known to have up to 20.

== Characteristics ==
The barasingha is a large deer with a shoulder height of 44 to 46 in (110 to 120 cm) and a head-to-body length of nearly 6 ft (180 cm). Its hair is rather woolly and yellowish brown above but paler below, with white spots along the spine. The throat, belly, inside of the thighs and beneath the tail is white. In summer, the coat becomes bright rufous-brown. The neck is maned. Females are paler than males. Young are spotted. Average antlers measure 30 in (76 cm) round the curve with a girth of 5 in (13 cm) at mid beam. A record antler measured 104.1 cm (41.0 in) round the curve.

Stags weigh 170 to 280 kg (370 to 620 lb). Females are less heavy, weighing about 130 to 145 kg (287 to 320 lb). Large stags have weighed from 460 to 570 lb (210 to 260 kg).

== Distribution and habitat ==
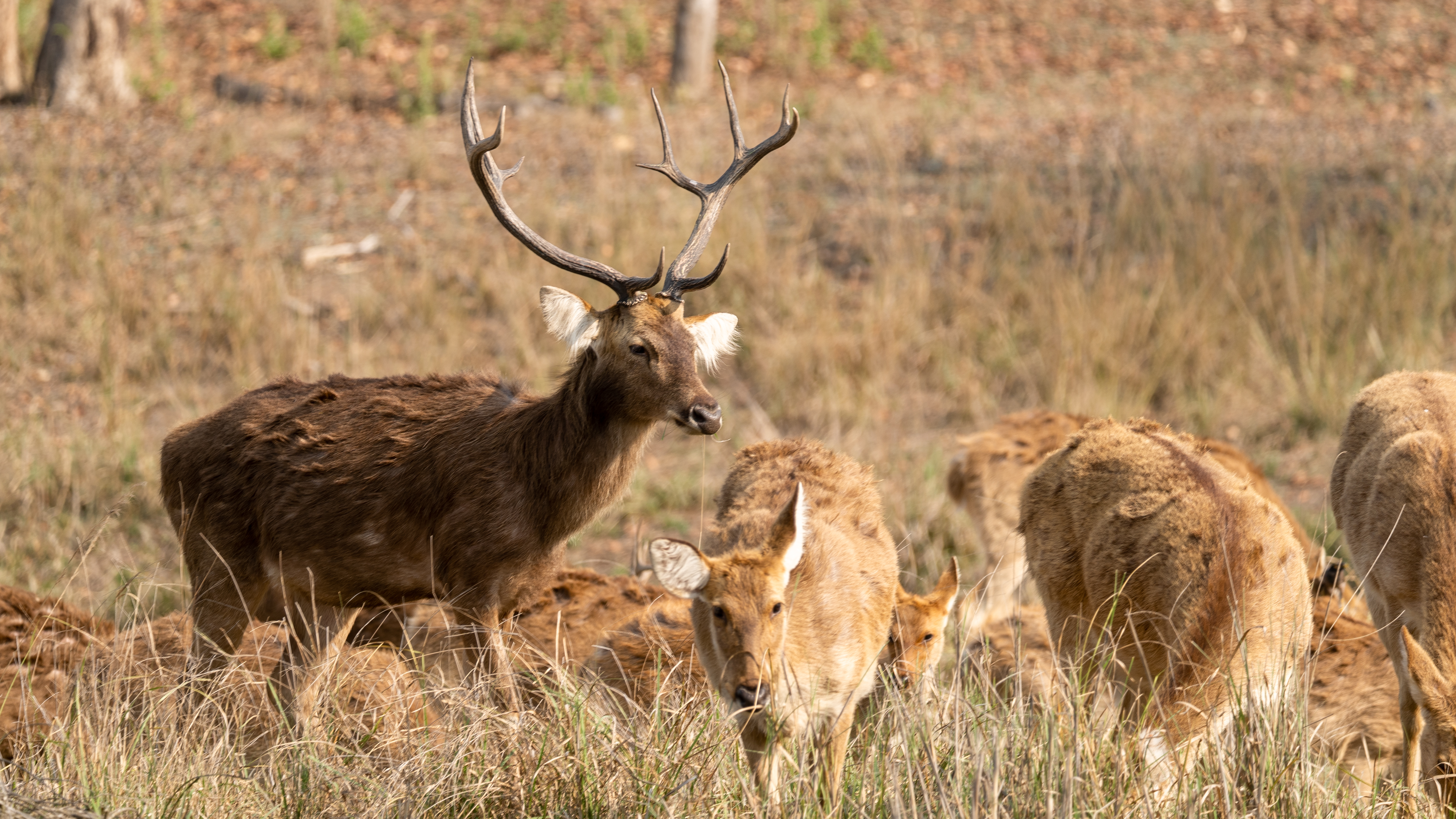
Barasingha herd in Kanha National Park

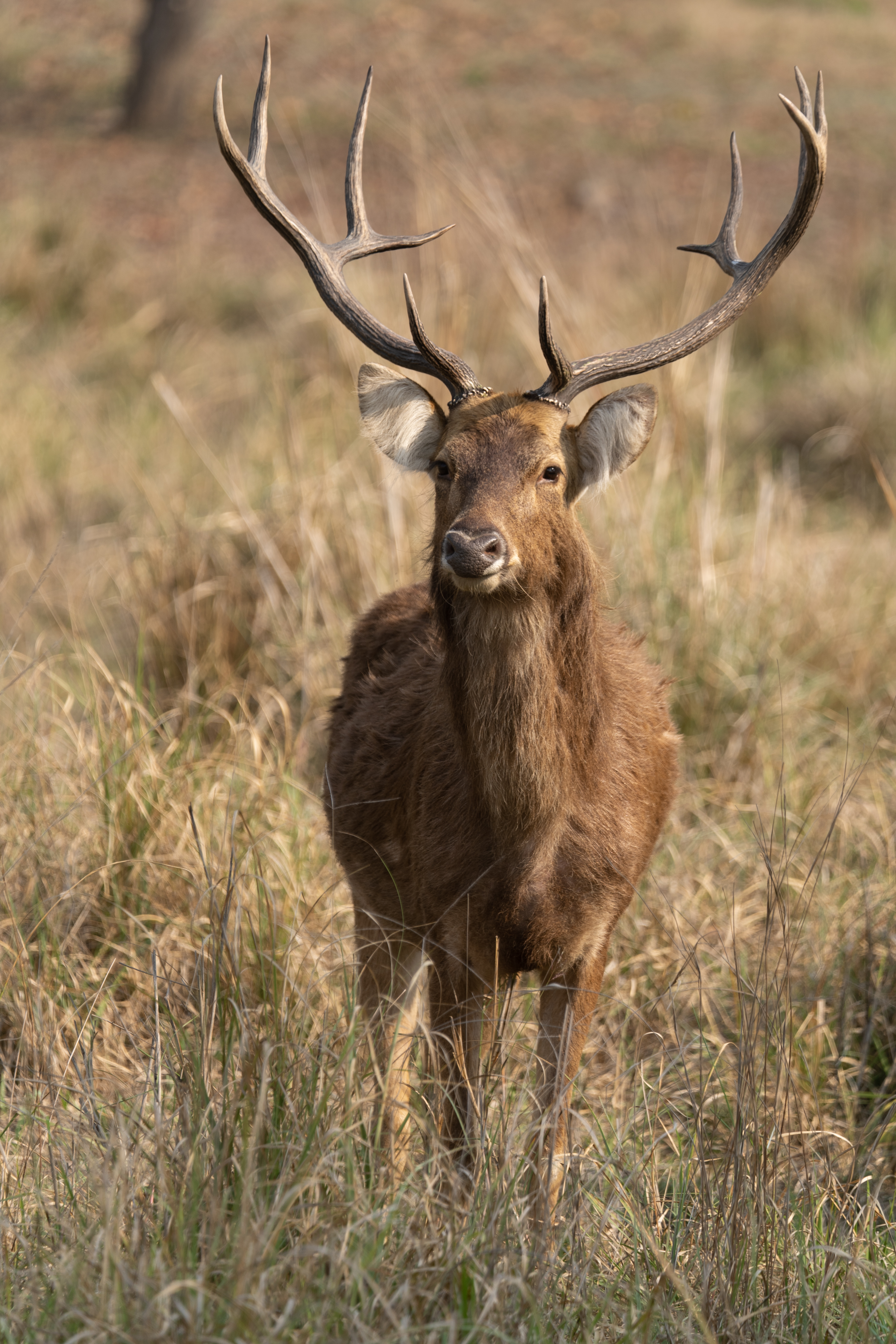
Barasingha stag

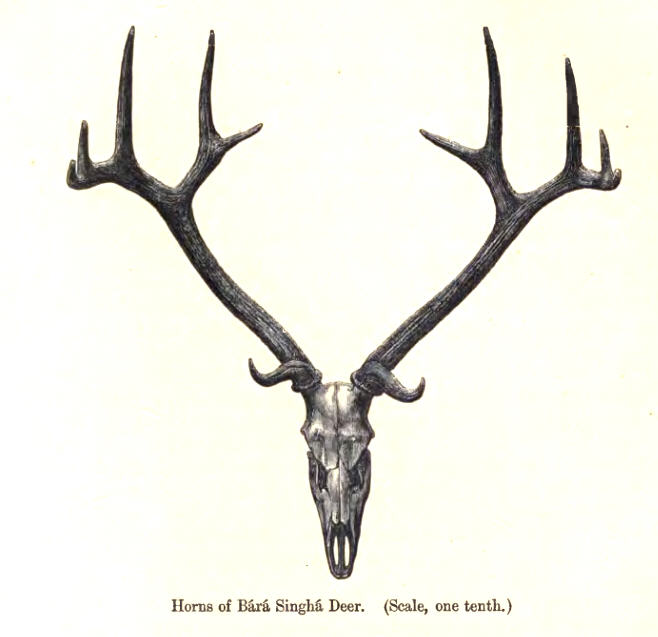
Illustration of barasingha antlers

Swamp deer were once common in many areas, including parts of the Upper Narmada Valley, south, in Bastar, and to the west in the Indus valley (mainly around Rohri and Bahawalpur) prior to the 19th century. They frequent flat or undulating grasslands, floodplains and marshes, and generally stay on the outskirts of forests. At times, they are also found in open forest. In the 1960s, the total population was estimated to be between 1,600 and 2,150 individuals in India, with about 1,600 in Nepal. Today, the distribution is further reduced and fragmented, due to major losses in the 1930s–1960s following unregulated hunting and conversion of large tracts of habitat into cropland.

In Nepal, the barasingha is present in Shuklaphanta and Bardiya National Parks. In India, it is present in six localities in Uttar Pradesh, in Kanha National Park and in Chhattisgarh near Dhamtari, likely the most southerly extent of its distribution. It is regionally extinct in West Bengal, and also likely in Arunachal Pradesh, Bihar, Jharkhand, Meghalaya, Nagaland and Odisha. A few barasingha still survive in Assam's Kaziranga and Manas National Parks.

In 2005, a small population of about 320 individuals was discovered in Jhilmil Jheel Conservation Reserve in Haridwar district, Uttarakhand, on the east bank of the Ganges. This likely represents the most northerly limit of the species.

=== Distribution of subspecies ===
Three subspecies are currently recognized:

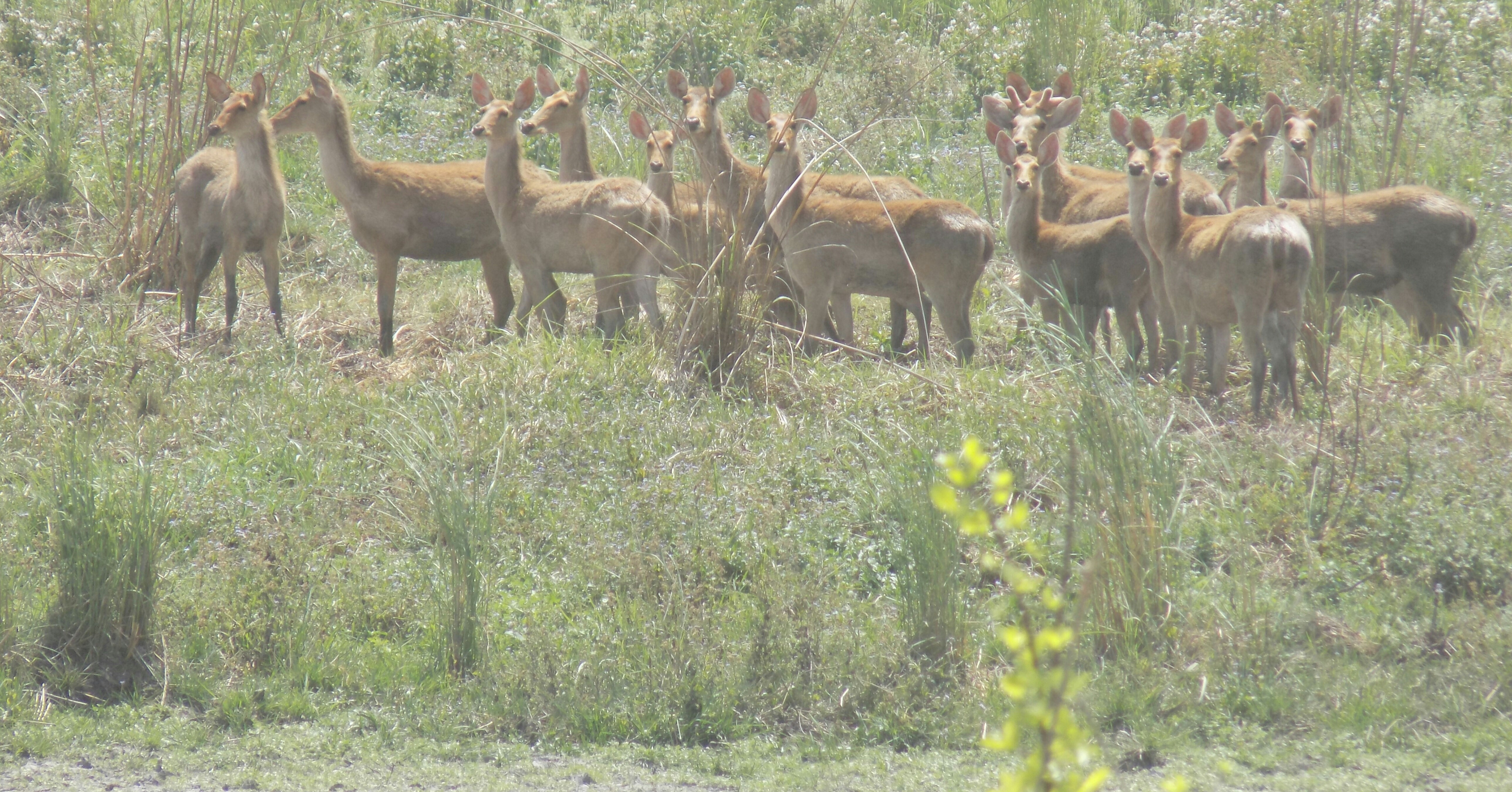
Swamp deer in Dudhwa National Park, Uttar Pradesh

- Western swamp deer R. d. duvauceli (Cuvier, 1823) – the nominate subspecies, and most abundant, this water-loving deer has splayed hooves and is adapted to the flooded grassland habitat of the Indo-Gangetic Plain; in the early 1990s, populations in India were estimated at 1,500–2,000 individuals, and 1,500–1,900 individuals in the Shuklaphanta Wildlife Reserve of Nepal; the latter population reached 2,170 individuals, including 385 fawns, in spring 2013.

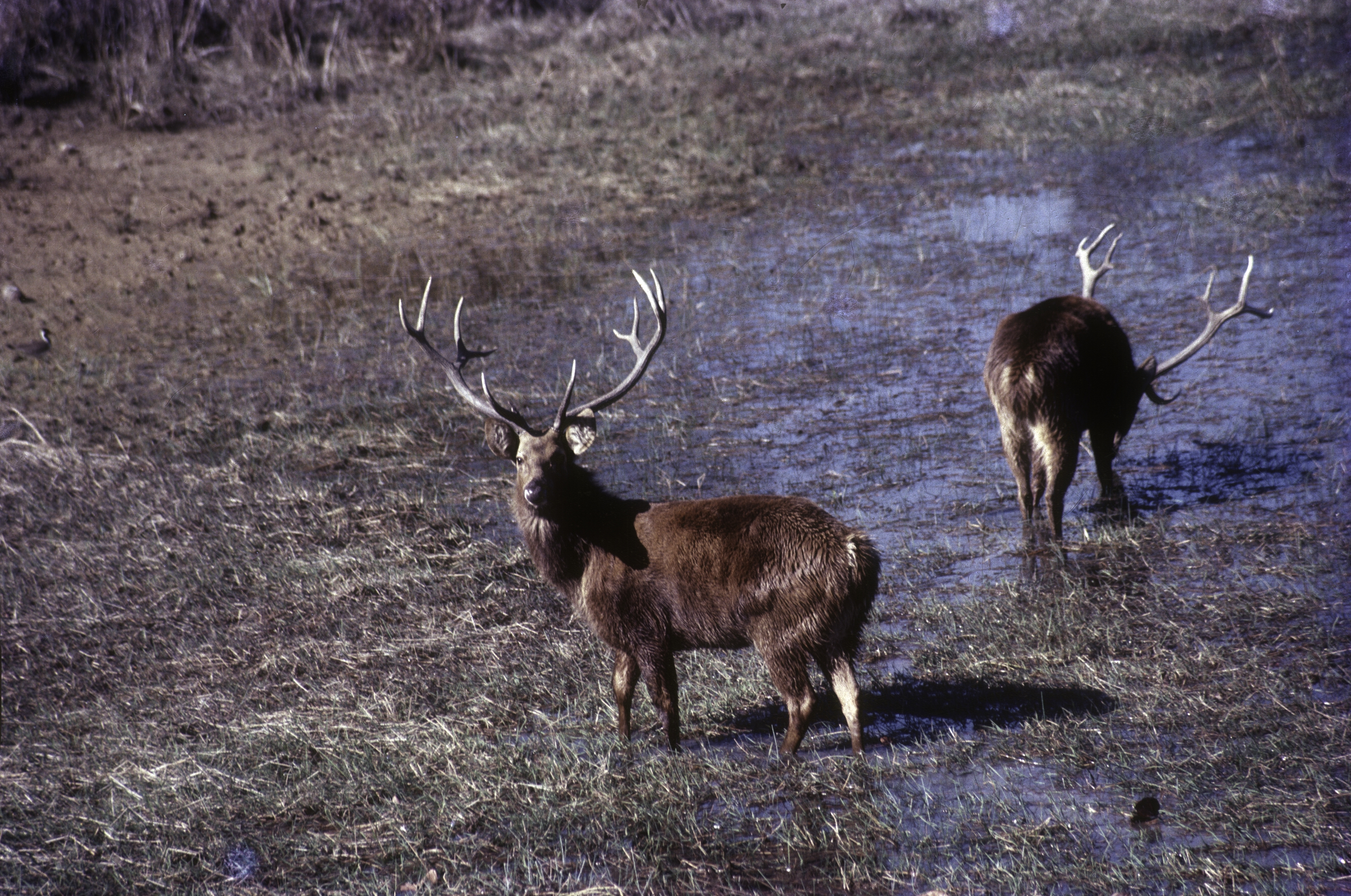
Swamp deer at Kanha National Park

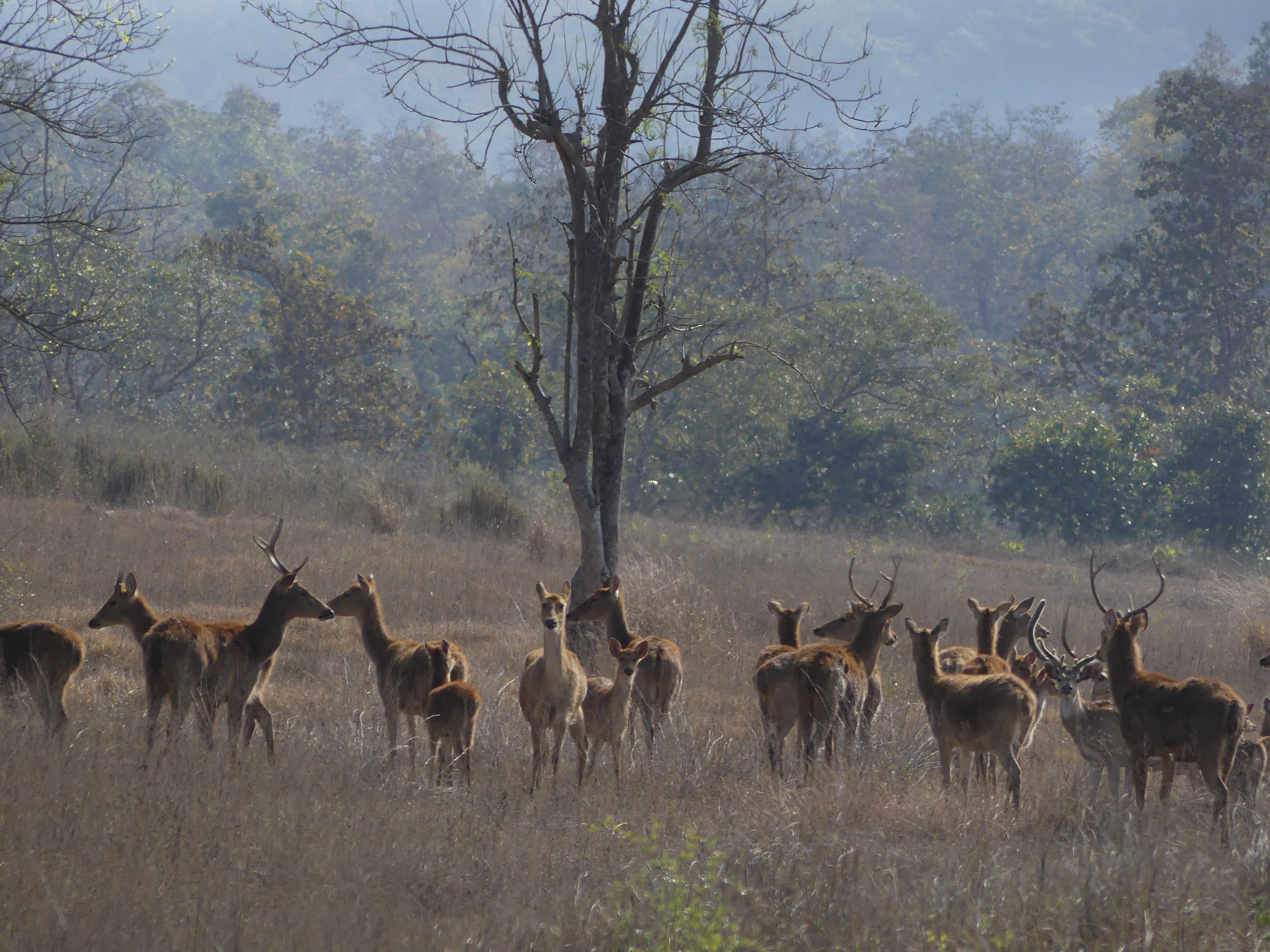
Swamp deer in Satpura Tiger Reserve

- Southern swamp deer (or hard ground swamp deer) R. d. branderi (Pocock 1943) – has hard hooves and is adapted to hard ground in open sal forest with a grass understorey; survives only in Kanha National Park, to the west of Chhattisgarh and east of Madhya Pradesh. The population numbered about 500 individuals in 1988; 300–350 individuals were estimated at the turn of the century; and 750 in 2016. It was reintroduced into Satpura Tiger Reserve.

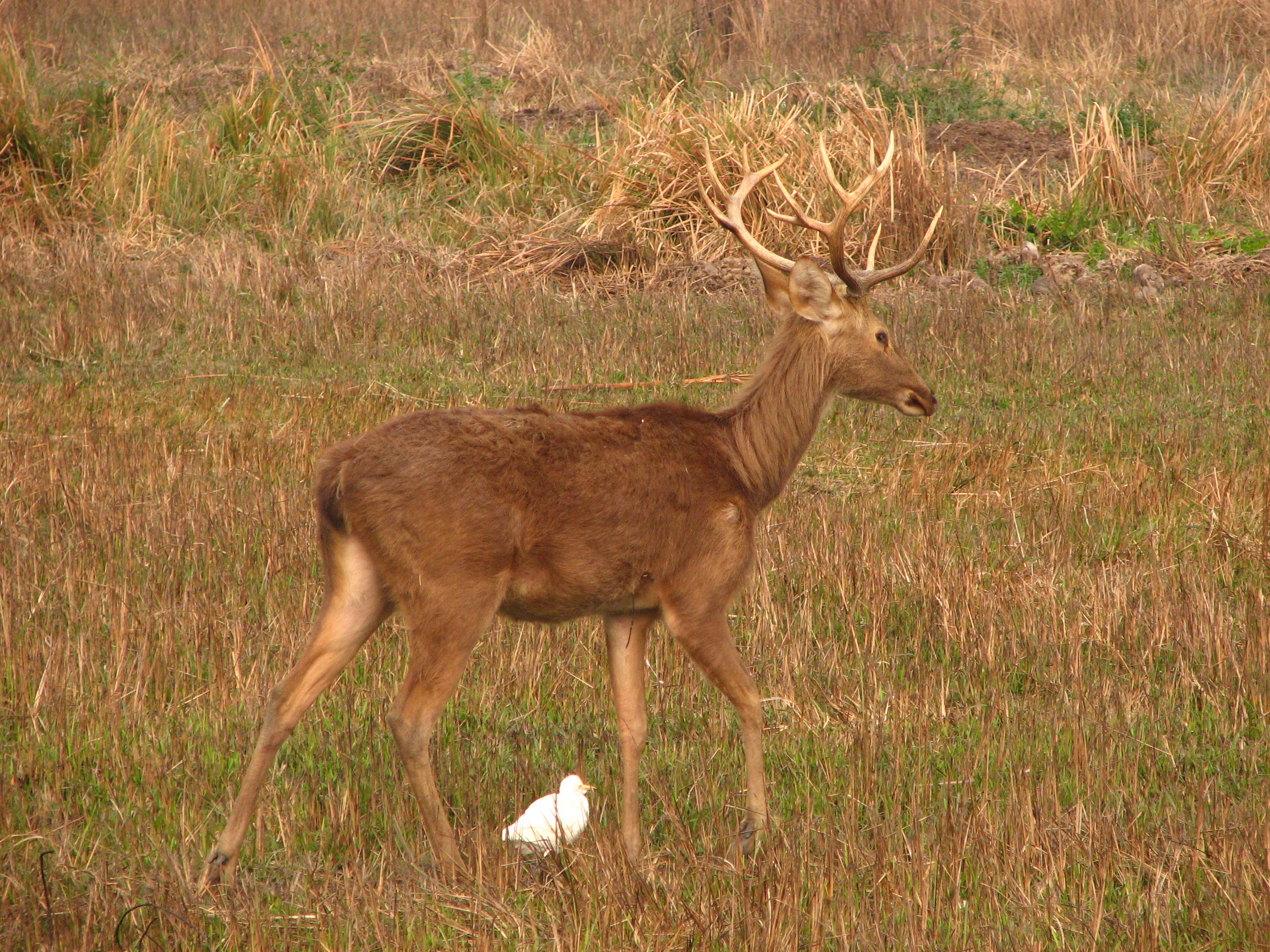
Swamp deer stag in Kaziranga National Park

- Eastern swamp deer R. d. ranjitsinhi (Grooves 1982) – occurs only in Assam, where the population numbered about 700 individuals in 1978; 400–500 individuals were estimated in Kaziranga National Park at the turn of the century. After a census conducted in 2021, 868 individuals were estimated in the park, with a further 121 in Manas National Park.

== Ecology and behaviour ==
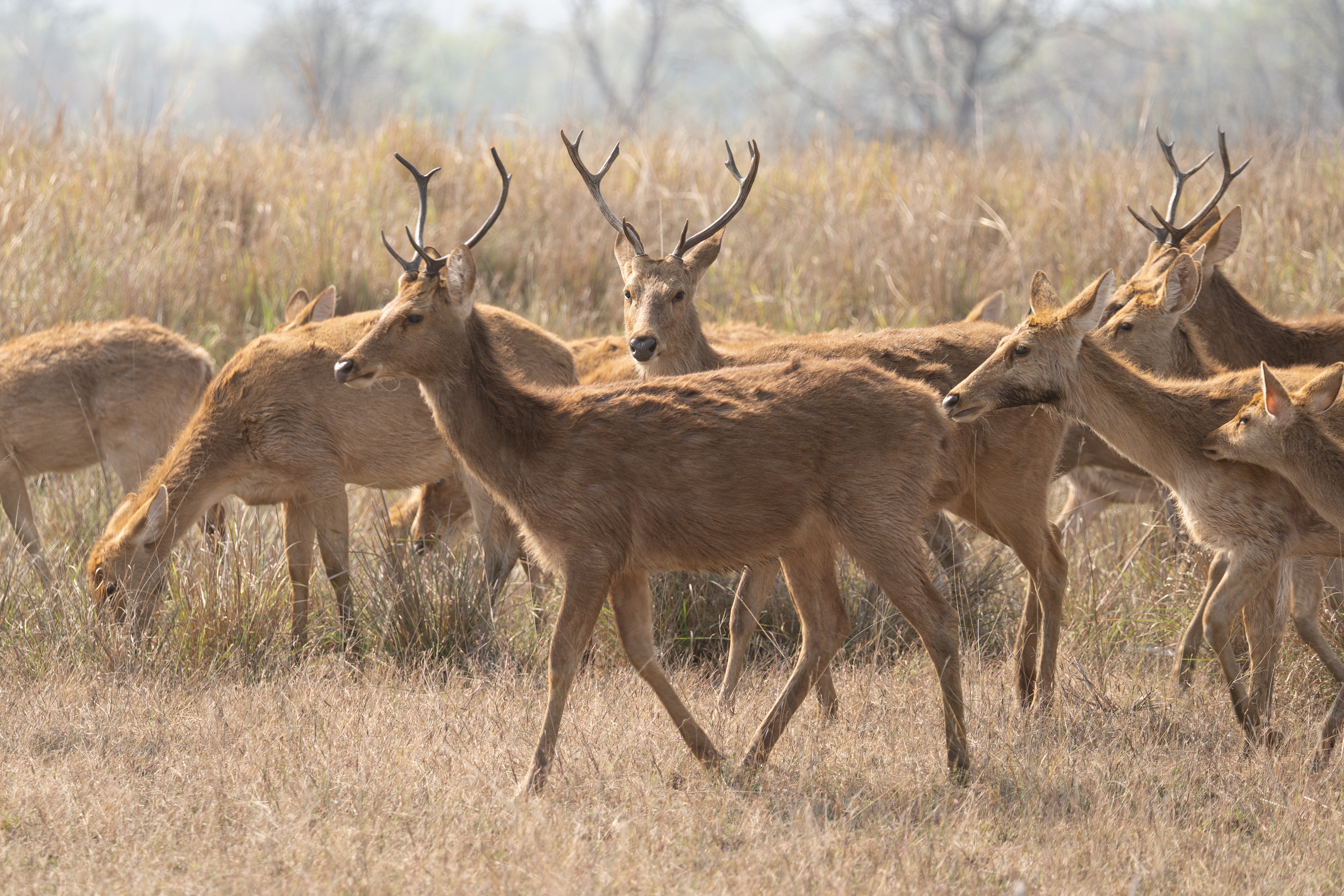
Herd of swamp deer grazing in Kanha National Park

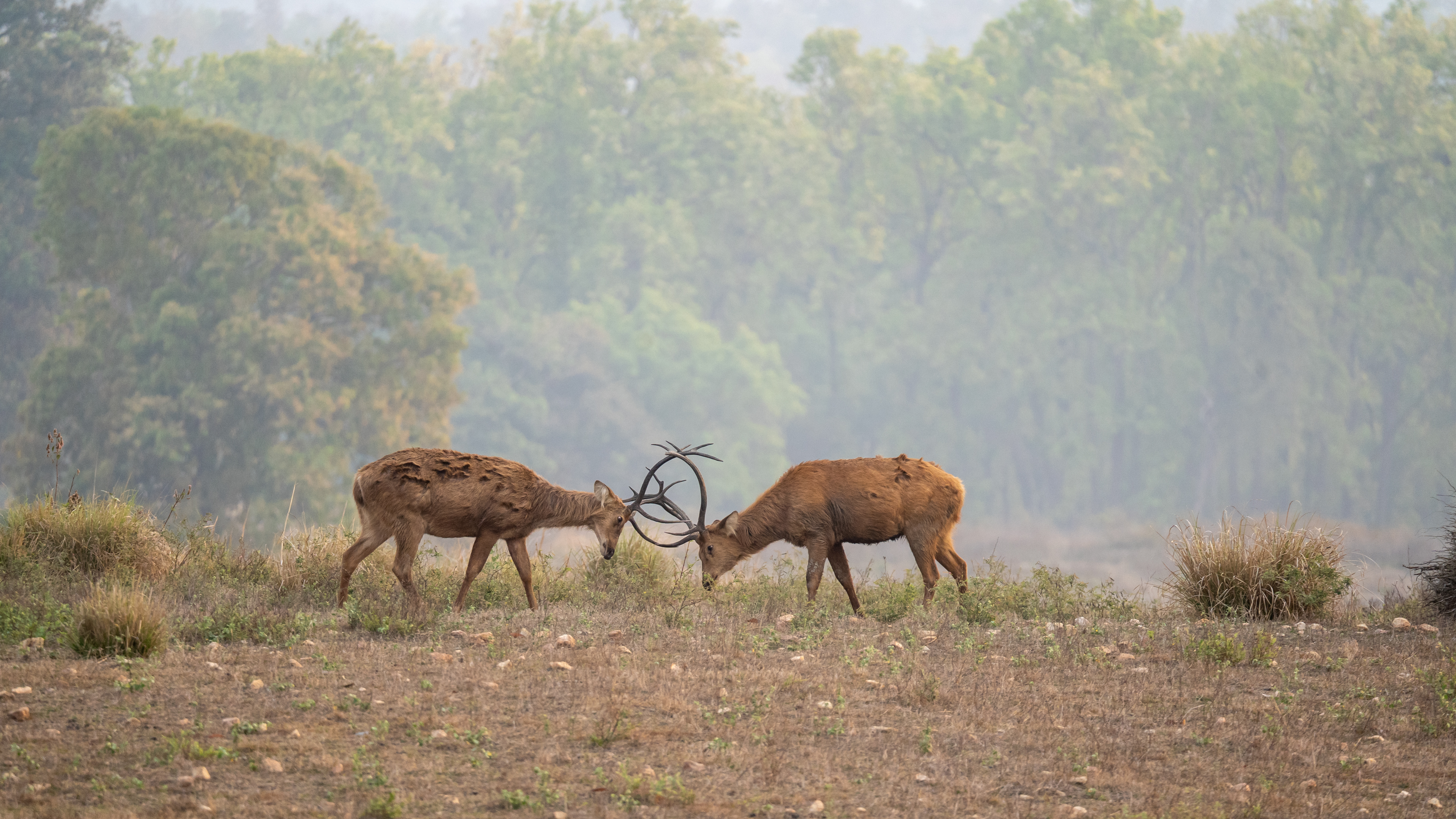
Barasingha stags rutting in Kanha National Park

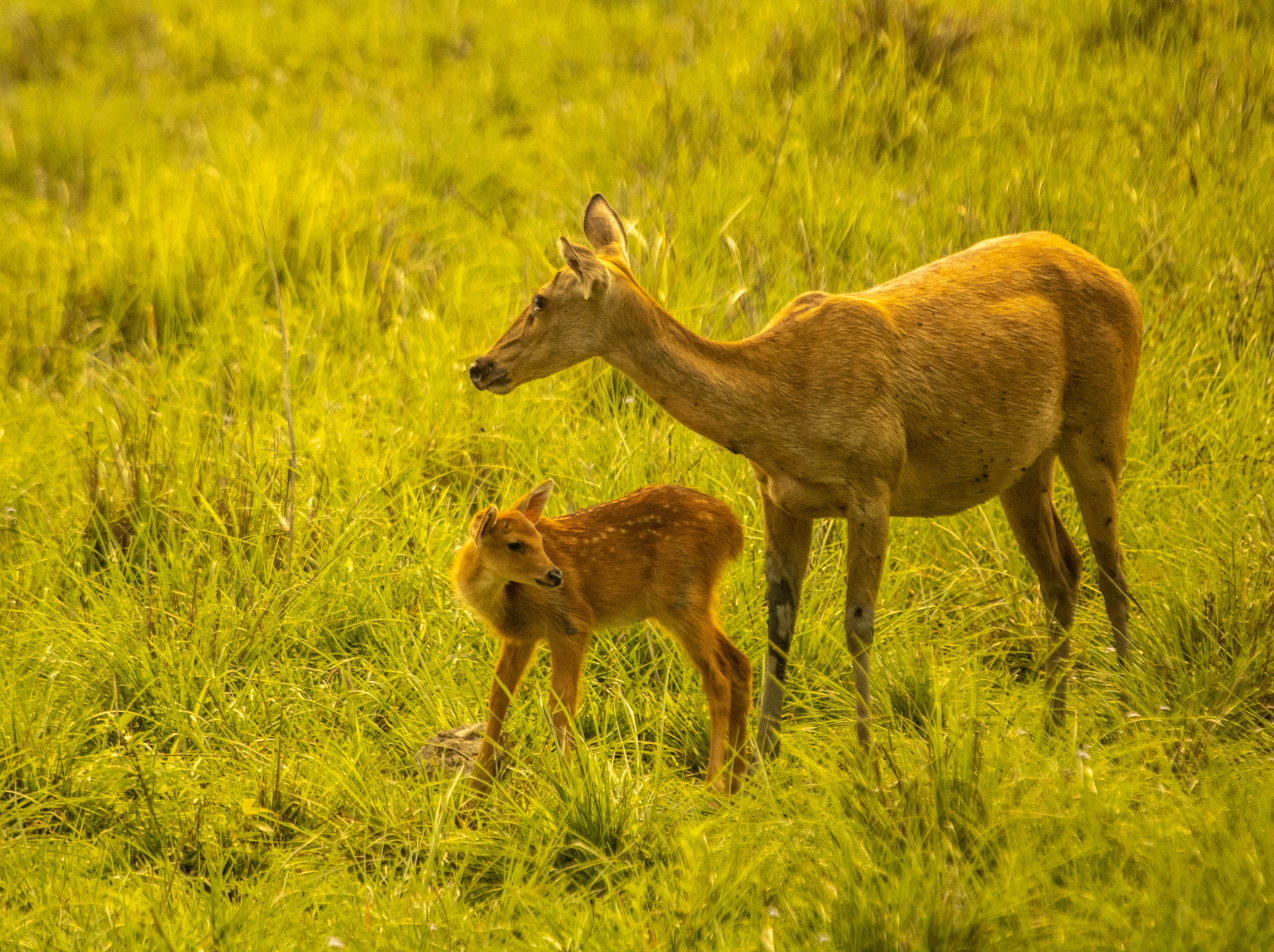
A barasingha mother and fawn in Assam

Swamp deer are mainly grazers. They largely feed on grasses and aquatic plants, foremost on Saccharum, Imperata cylindrica, Narenga porphyrocoma, Phragmites karka, Oryza rufipogon, Hygroryza and Hydrilla. They feed throughout the day with peaks during the mornings and late afternoons to evenings. In winter and monsoon, they drink water twice, and thrice or more in summer. In the hot season, they rest in the shade of trees during the day.

In central India, the herds comprise on average about 8–20 individuals, with large herds of up to 60. There are twice as many females than males. During the rut they form large herds of adults. The breeding season lasts from September to April, and births occur after a gestation of 240–250 days in August to November. The peak is in September and October in Kanha National Park. They give birth to single calves.

When alarmed, they give out shrill, baying alarm calls. Compared to other deer species, barasingha are more relaxed when it comes to guarding. They have fewer sentries and they spend most of their time grazing, unlike deer species like spotted deer or sambar deer.

== Threats ==
The swamp deer populations outside protected areas and seasonally migrating populations are threatened by poaching for antlers and meat, which are sold in local markets. Swamp deer lost most of its former range because wetlands were converted and used for agriculture so that suitable habitat was reduced to small and isolated fragments. The remaining habitat in protected areas is threatened by the change in river dynamics, reduced water flow during summer, increasing siltation, and is further degraded by local people who cut grass, timber and fuelwood, and by illegal farming on government land.

George Schaller wrote: "Most of these remnants have or soon will have reached the point of no return."

== Conservation ==
Rucervus duvaucelii is listed on CITES Appendix I. In India, it is included under Schedule I of the Wildlife Protection Act of 1972.

The barasingha underwent one of India's most significant wildlife recoveries during the late 20th and early 21st centuries. By the late 1960s, the species had become critically endangered in central India due to habitat loss, poaching, disease transmission from livestock, and degradation of grassland ecosystems. Kanha Tiger Reserve in Madhya Pradesh remained the last stronghold of the hard-ground subspecies, where its population declined to an estimated 66 individuals in 1970.

A long-term conservation programme was initiated in Kanha to prevent the extinction of the species. Management measures included grassland and swamp restoration, restrictions on livestock grazing to reduce disease transmission etc. These interventions resulted in steady population growth over subsequent decades. By the early 2000s, the Kanha population had increased to several hundred individuals, and by the 2020s it approached 1,000 individuals.

As the Kanha population stabilised, the Barasingha were reintroduced to reserves including Satpura, Van Vihar, and Bandhavgarh Tiger Reserve; in 2023, nineteen barasingha were released into Bandhavgarh to re-establish the species in parts of its former range.

== In culture ==
- The barasingha is the state animal of the Indian states of Madhya Pradesh and Uttar Pradesh.
- A barasingha is mentioned ten times in The Miracle of Purun Bhagat, the second story in The Second Jungle Book. As that part of the story is set in the Himalayas, it is probably meant to be a member of the relict Rucervus duvaucelii duvaucelii population living on both sides of the India – Nepal border.

== See also ==
- Chital
- Sambar deer
