= Herbert Stevens =

British ornithologist and entomologist (1877–1964)

- Born: 27 January 1877; Greetland, Yorkshire
- Died: 1 June 1964 (aged 87); Aylesbury, Buckinghamshire
- Scientific career
- Fields: Ornithology; Entomology

Herbert Stevens (27 January 1877 – 1 June 1964) was a British ornithologist and entomologist.

Stevens' regular employment was as a tea-planter. He left the U.K. in 1901 to work in India, and became the manager of the Gopaldhara Tea Estate in Darjeeling.

In 1921 Stevens returned to live in the U.K., settling at Tring, Hertfordshire with his wife Amy. From time to time in later life Stevens traveled as a naturalist, for example taking part in the Sladen-Godman Expedition to Tonkin [northern Vietnam] in 1925 and the Kelley-Roosevelt Asiatic Expedition to China in 1928. In 1930–1931, Stevens participated in Charles Suydam Cutting's Expedition to Sikkim and Bengal Terai, where he collected mammal, bird and reptile specimens for the Field Museum of Chicago.

== Select publications ==
- "Notes on the Birds of the Sikkim Himalayas, part i". The Journal of the Bombay Natural History Society, volume 29, part 1, pages 503-518 (1923)
- "Notes on the Birds of the Sikkim Himalayas, part ii". The Journal of the Bombay Natural History Society, volume 29, part 3, pages 723-740 (1923)
- "Notes on the Birds of the Sikkim Himalayas, part iii". The Journal of the Bombay Natural History Society, volume 29, part 4, pages 1007-1030 (1923)
- "Notes on the Birds of the Sikkim Himalayas, part iv". The Journal of the Bombay Natural History Society, volume 30, part 1, pages 54–71 (1924)
- "Notes on the Birds of the Sikkim Himalayas, part v". The Journal of the Bombay Natural History Society, volume 30, part 2, pages 352-379 (1924)
- Through Deep Defiles to Tibetan Uplands: The Travels of a Naturalist from the Irrawaddy to the Yangtse. Published by H., F. and G. Witherby, London (1934)
