= American Committee for the Defense of British Homes =

American non-profit organization during World War II

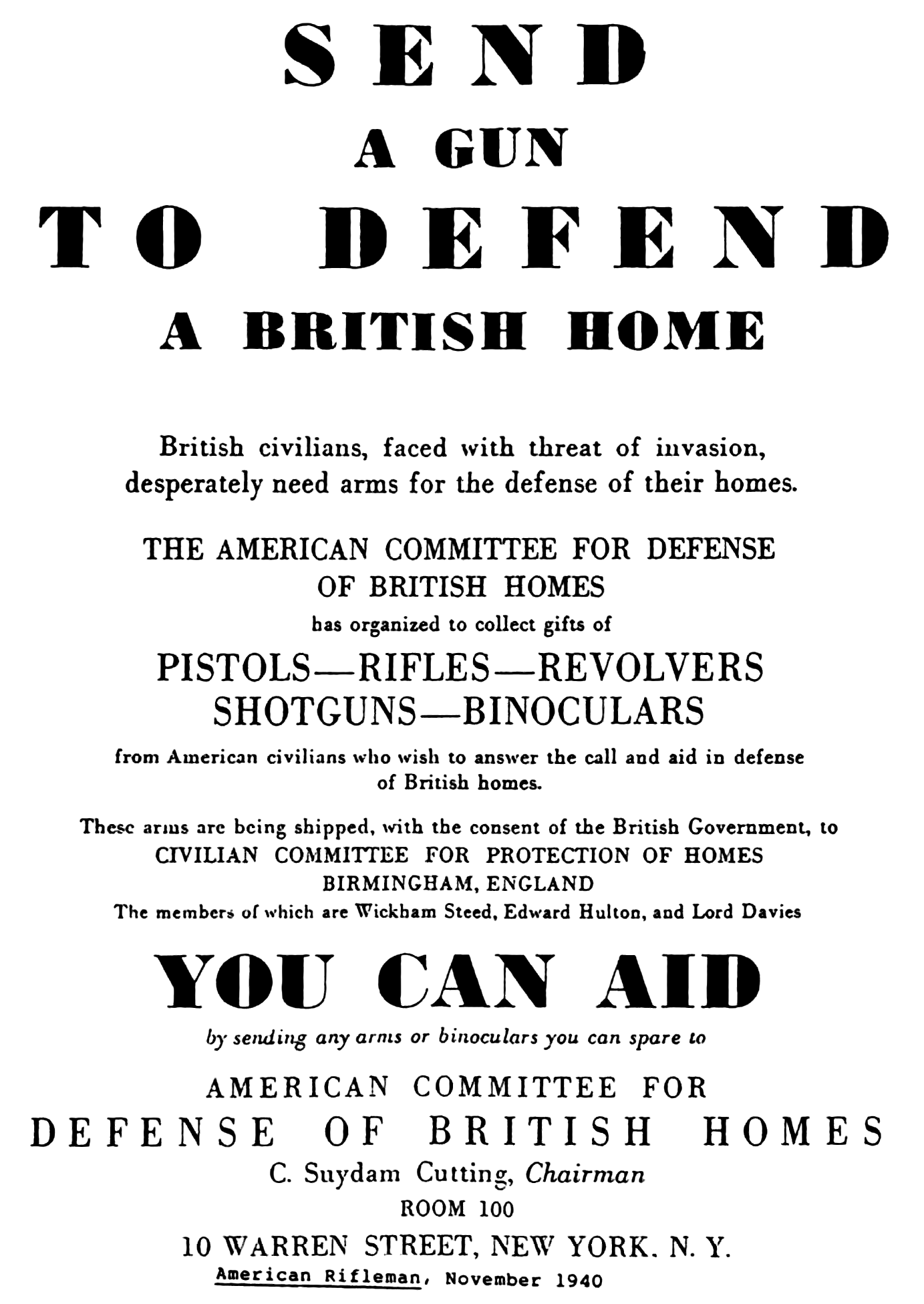
An ad published by the Committee

The American Committee for the Defense of British Homes was an American organization during World War II that donated weapons to help defend Britain from a potential German invasion. It was issued a State Department license to export weapons to a British civilian body. British government policy was against the participation of civilians in warfare and the Firearms Act 1937 made it illegal to distribute firearms to civilians for self defense purposes. The ACDBH secured the support of Lord Beaverbrook and worked closely with his Ministry of Aircraft Production (MAP). Many of the weapons were used to arm MAP Home Guard units, despite the Home Guard being part of the British armed forces.

The ACDBH came into conflict with the British government when it tried to purchase quantities of military-issue weapons, potentially disrupting the Ministry of Supply's own procurement programmes. Donations to the ACDBH declined following the US entry into the war and it was wound up in June 1942. As well as weapons it supplied helmets, binoculars and stopwatches which may have been of greater practical use.

== Formation ==
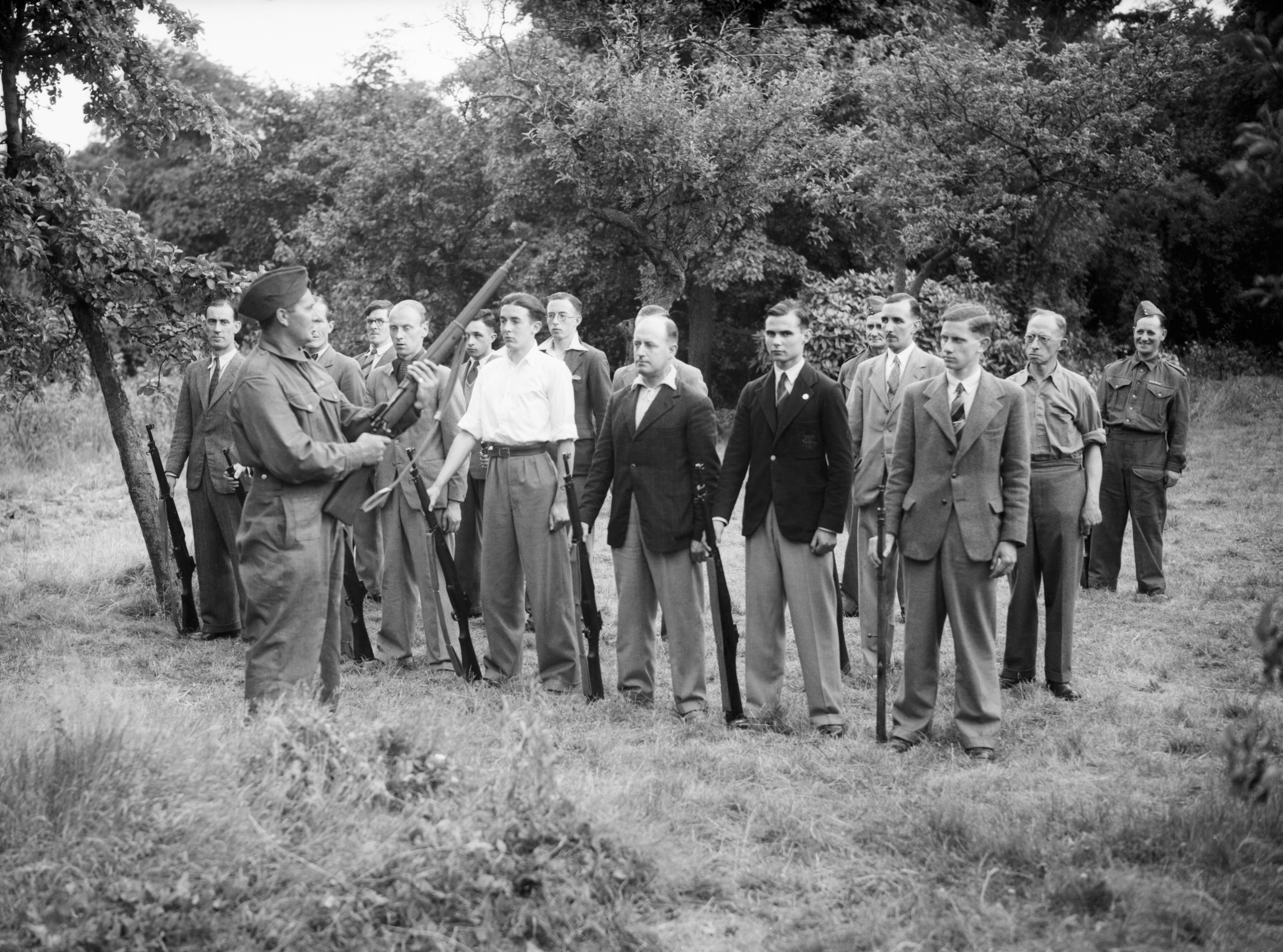
An early parade of the LDV in July 1940

The committee arose from a desire by the American public to provide private arms for the defense of British homes. Offers had been made to the British Purchasing Commission (BPC), responsible for co-ordinating the British procurement of war supplies in North America, by the Committee to Defend America by Aiding the Allies (CDAAA) in early July. The BPC passed this to the British Ministry of Supply, emphasising that acceptance would help increase support in the US for the British war effort. The Ministry of Supply responded on July 3 to ask the BPC to accept the offers. The CDAAA was unwilling to risk its lobbying influence by involvement in the scheme and set up the American Committee for the Defense of British Homes in New York on July 31, 1940, with C. Suydam Cutting as its chairman. It was headquartered at the Fiala Exploration Outfitters on Waren Street and members included Anthony Fiala (owner of the store and the committee's technical adviser), Douglas B. Wesson (of Smith & Wesson), Albert Foster (of Colt's Manufacturing Company), Karl Frederick (director of the National Rifle Association of America), Lowell Thomas (radio broadcaster), Harold Anthony (American Museum of Natural History) and Clare Boothe Luce (author and campaigner). A BPC liaison officer, Robert Macneil, chief of Clan MacNeil, was also appointed.

This belief that British civilians required arms may have its origins in the Second Amendment to the United States Constitution which protects the rights of American citizens to keep weapons at home. The British government's policy was against a general arming of the public, though it was more than willing to distribute arms to civilians in occupied Europe. The British government had held an arms amnesty at the start of the war, removing unneeded or unwanted weapons from civilian hands. The Local Defence Volunteers (later known as the Home Guard), had been set up partly to channel civilians keen to fight into a uniformed and organised force under government control. British advice to its citizenry was that "civilians who try to join in the fight are more likely to get in the way than to help. The defeat of an enemy attack is the task of the armed forces which include the Home Guard, so if you wish to fight enrol in the Home Guard". The unlicensed distribution of arms to British civilians was forbidden by the Firearms Act 1937. After the response to volunteers for the LDV vastly exceeded what had been expected a call was made for British citizens to lend weapons to the force. Some 20,000 firearms were collected, mainly sporting weapons and souvenir hand guns from the First World War. However this was a stopgap measure until enough military-grade weapons could be found.

== British response ==
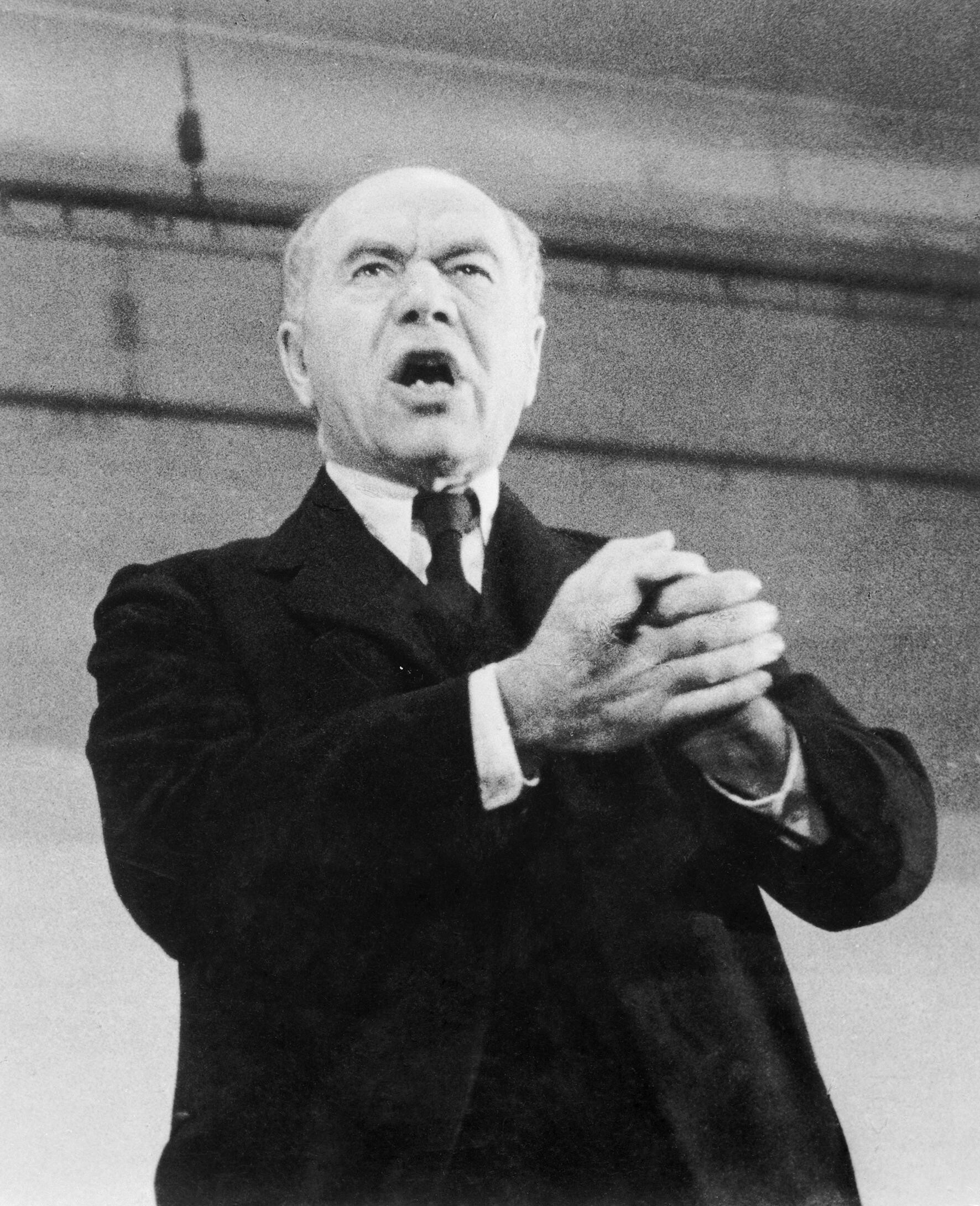
Lord Beaverbrook

The campaign secured the support of Lord Beaverbrook, minister for aircraft production, when a supporter, Richard Cotton the American managing director of the British Rola company, wrote to the British peer on August 27 falsely claiming "there will shortly be a considerable quantity of arms and ammunition" at the New York docks ready for shipment to the UK; the campaign for donations did not actually begin until September 12. Beaverbrook agreed to meet with Cotton on August 29 and agreed he would take the weapons for the defence of Ministry of Aircraft Production (MAP) factories. It is not clear if Cotton had authorisation from the ACDBH to agree to this.

The Foreign Office was concerned that the scheme might violate the American Neutrality Acts of the 1930s, but the MAP disregarded this. They also advised Beaverbrook to consult with the BPC but he also refused to do this, considering the MAP had the right to make its own arrangements. Attempts by the BPC under Arthur Blaikie Purvis to reign in the ACDBH in early September proved ineffective and were side-stepped by the agreement with the MAP.

There were also concerns that the scheme would provide a propaganda benefit for the Germans, who could portray the British as desperate. W.J. Haslet of the war cabinet's Central Office for North American Supplies regarded the scheme as a "MAP racket" advertised to the American public on false pretences. General Alan Brooke accused Beaverbrook of being an "evil genius" planning to turn the MAP Home Guard into his own private army. Sir Anthony Eden, as Secretary of State for War, reminded Beaverbrook that the Home Guard were within his department's responsibility. He was rebuffed when he suggested the MAP keep the rifles and the War Office take the more militarily useful revolvers and binoculars, which were also being requested. The more pressing military need was for military weapons for the British Army, machine guns and anti-tank weapons which could only be met by government orders. As the practical benefit of the campaign was limited, it was grudgingly allowed to continue by the British government in the hope that it would encourage American support at governmental level, including for the Lend-Lease acts.

A Citizen's Defence Committee (CDC) had been formed in Britain in July, after the initial CDAAA correspondence, co-ordinate reception of the weapons. It was led by newspaper magnate Edward George Warris Hulton (Note: Hulton, Priestley and Wintringham were members of the 1941 Committee) and members included Virginia Cherrill, Countess of Jersey, Home Guard supporter Tom Wintringham (Note: Wintringham had fought in the Spanish Civil War and operated a private Home Guard training school at Osterley Park which was owned by Virginia Chervill's husband George Child Villiers, 9th Earl of Jersey.), the writer J. B. Priestley, the Liberal peer David Davies, 1st Baron Davies and the former journalist Henry Wickham Steed. Macneil had hoped to create a committee staffed with his Scottish acquaintances but the early creation of the CDC thwarted this. Macneil's relations with the CDC remained tense throughout the campaign. The Cabinet Office was concerned about Hulton's enthusiasm for arming civilians and worried he might use the Picture Post to publicise his campaign and break the agreement with the State Department. Hulton was persuaded to stand aside in favour of Steed by mid-September. Though Hulton remained on the committee he and Wintringham, who held similar views, appear to have played little active part thereafter.

== First donations ==
The ACDBH received a State Department permit to export weapons on September 3, 1940, though a restriction was imposed that the weapons must be delivered to a civilian body not a government organisation. The ACSBH had named a fictitious Civilian Committee for the Protection of Homes in Britain as the civilian body to receive the weapons. To comply with the permit the CDC changed its name to match (it later became the Civilian Committee for the Defence of Homes). Another restriction was that there was to be no appeal for arms from Britain, it had to appear as a spontaneous American initiative.

The ACDBH set up 364 local committees across the United States, with at least one in each of the then 48 states. The ACDBH organised press releases and public meetings to publicize the campaign. As well as donations from American civilians the ACDBH received weapons confiscated by police departments and the Federal Bureau of Investigation. Donations were also sought from banks and prisons. Donated weapons were concentrated at New York for shipping to Castle Bromwich, England. Royal Air Force personnel unpacked the weapons and ammunition, checked, serviced, sorted, and distributed them, mainly to the Home Guard of MAP factories.

To comply with the export permit restrictions the Home Guard was portrayed as a civilian body separate from the British armed forces. That the weapons were to be used by servicemen to defend aircraft factories and not by civilians to defend their own homes was not mentioned in publicity. The British government refused to become involved in publicising the scheme or encouraging donations. Individual Home Guard units did, however, patriciate sending photographs of donated weapons and letters of thanks to the United States. Beaverbrook briefly broke with the government's policy on publicity in November and December 1940, making a broadcast in the United States and sending a message of thanks to the ACDBH. After his June 1941 resignation from the MAP Beaverbrook supported the government position.

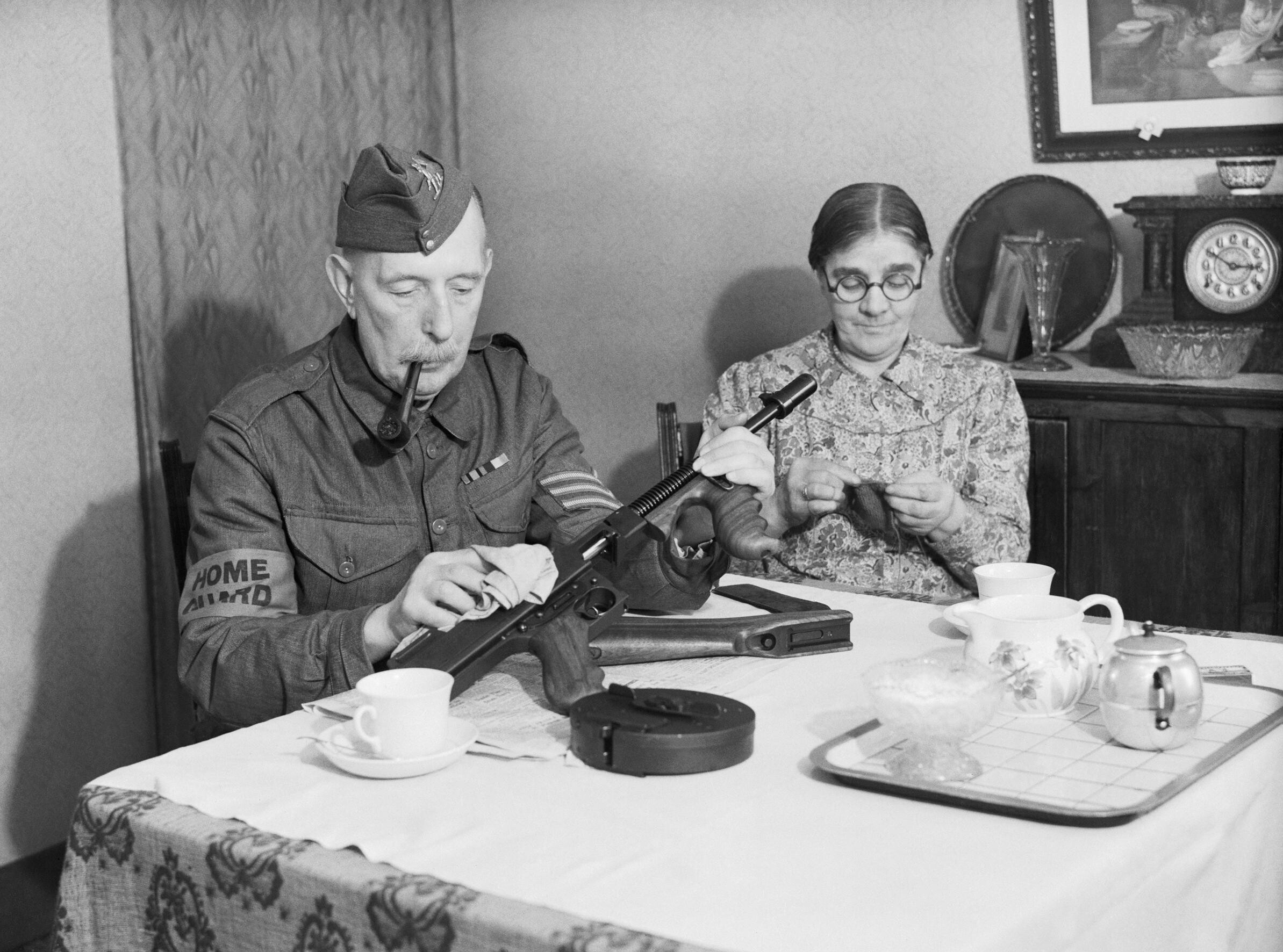
A Home Guard volunteer with a Thompson sub-machine gun in December 1940. This photo was staged, as the Thompson had not at that point been issued to HG units.

The campaign donated Thompson submachine guns, which its British partner, the Civilian Committee for the Protection of Homes in Britain, falsely claimed were unavailable in the UK. The British government had in fact ordered Thompsons as early as January 1940 and by November was accounting for the entire production of the weapon. The ACDBH supplied only 110 Thompsons during the war, including 40 from stocks confiscated by American police forces, that arrived after December 1941.

The first consignment arrived in November 1941 and a Home Guard unit at a Vickers MAP factory in Birmingham were among the first recipients of donated weapons, receiving 100 Remington Model 341 rifles. As well as firearms binoculars were also sent, including a pair donated by Admiral William Sims and were used to equip Royal Observer Corps (ROC) posts and factory firewatchers. Stopwatches, including one donated by jockey Charlie Kurtsinger were used by the ROC to time the flights of German aircraft.

The campaign had collected around 1,300 weapons and binoculars by November 1940, including a hunting rifle from Theodore Roosevelt. Perhaps the best known example from the era was Major John W. Hession's rifle, a Springfield SN 264631. Hession was a marksman at the 1908 Olympics. When it was sent over for use in the war it bore two inscribed nameplates. One contained information about the owner, and the other said: "For obvious reasons the return of this rifle after Germany is defeated would be deeply appreciated". By January 1941 some ordinary Home Guard units, including those formed of American citizens in the UK, were armed with donated weapons.

== Conflict with British government supply policy ==
The agreement of the Lend-Lease scheme assisted the British import of weapons from the United States and largely rendered the small-scale ACDBH donations meaningless. After this point donations decreased.

An attempt by the ACDBH to purchase US Navy-issue revolvers in bulk was halted after the British government intercepted communications on the purchase, concerned that it would interfere with its official purchases. The Ministry of Supply instead ordered 10,837 of the revolvers directly through the Lend-Lease programme. The incident led to greater scrutiny by the British government who, on June 18, secured agreement from the MAP that the ACDBH should be discouraged. There was, however no desire from any politician to publicly oppose the scheme, it was instead decided to source reasonable quantities of automatic pistols through the ACDBH, paid for by the Ministry of Supply. The ACDBH was permitted to continue to source donations of private arms, but would have to report these to the War Office who would be responsible for distributing them. Donations of personal firearms declined significantly. By mid 1941 it had become apparent to many in the US that the Home Guard was not a motley band of ill-armed civilians but a distinctly military body and efforts were made to reduce their presence in the campaign's publicity. Relations between the British and American committees deteriorated after MacNeil tried to establish himself as controller of communications between the two bodies and the British body continued to refer to the Home Guard. By October 1941 the British committee was running at a loss and was funded partly by donations from its own committee members. The ACDBH declined in relevance after the American entry into the war that December and the ACDBH was dissolved in June 1942.

It had donated 25,343 firearms, consisting of 5,133 long guns, 6,337 donated revolvers, 13,763 revolvers purchased with financial donations and the 110 Thompsons sub-machine guns. The weapons were supplied with 2,042,291 rounds of ammunition. More than half of the weapons donated by the ACDBH were actually purchased by them using financial donations and not given by private citizens. Contemporary news reports often overplayed the number of donated weapons, because of this it is not uncommon to see erroneous figures of up to 500,000 donated weapons stated.

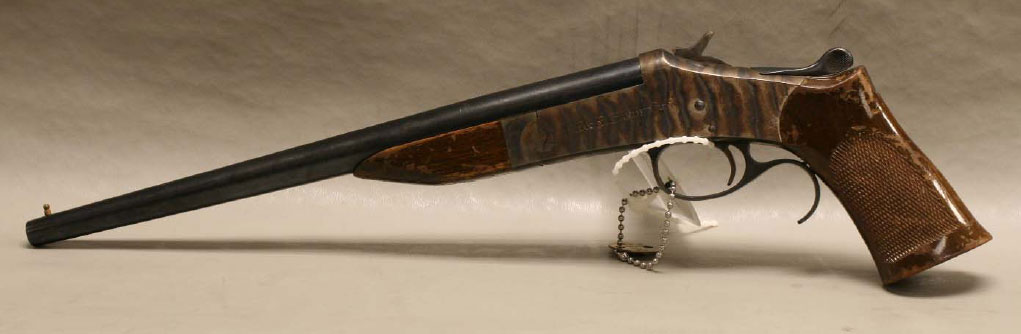
A Handy-Gun

Though it is best known for its work with firearms the ACDBH's contribution of 2,993 binoculars and 379 stop watches may have been more valuable to the war effort. Some 16,000 steel helmets were also donated, mainly American, French and German items of First World War vintage, though a shipment of 4,800 new helmets from the Steel Materials Corporation of Detroit were welcomed. The weapons were of various vintage, some dating to the 19th century, requiring black powder ammunition and of dubious practical military use, though at least one Lewis gun and Browning Automatic Rifle were donated. A particularly popular donation was the H&R Handy-Gun, which had been heavily regulated by the American National Firearms Act of 1934. By the time ACDBH weapons began to arrive the Home Guard had begun to be equipped with standardised military weapons. The official government purchases of weapons and domestic production vastly outweighed the donated weapons.

== In gun culture ==
During the war the National Rifle Association of America used the ACDBH campaign as propaganda, claiming that Britain was vulnerable to invasion because of its gun control laws such as the Firearms Act. The September 1940 issue of its magazine American Rifleman stated, falsely, that "England, long the model for our anti-gun reformers, has now scoured the highways and by-ways for guns to issue to a gun-ignorant citizenry". In December the same magazine claimed that the lack of firearms in civilian hands "by reason of the same type of gun law that is now proposed for America" forced British civilians "to turn to American arms plants and to American gun-owners for guns and ammunition for defense against invaders from without and criminals from within".

In parts of modern American gun culture the supposed failure to return weapons donated through the ACDBH has become a cause célèbre. However, few of the weapons donors expected their firearms to be returned to them. The ACDBH noted in its advertisements that "if any of the guns the Committee gets are obsolete or impractical, it trades them for other weapons, or sells them". It has been alleged, without corroboration, that after the war many weapons were burnt or dumped in the sea on police order. Some losses of donated weapons occurred from enemy action by air raid or U-boat; four vessels carrying ACDBH donated arms (out of a total of sixty-four shipments) were sunk in the war. Weapons of unusual calibre or unserviceable condition were scrapped during the war. At the wars end some 146 crates of weapons were handed back to a reformed ACDBH, still under Cutting's control. Those which could not be matched to donors or which were damaged were sold. The sale of 36 cases of rifles and shotguns raised $980 and that of a quantity of revolvers $6,149. In sending the first of weapons back to the US Cutting encountered considerable difficulty in surmounting state firearm laws. He judged the effort involved was too great and considered that few donors expected to see their weapons returned; he ordered the sale of the remaining weapons in the UK. Some of the proceeds were donated to the British Cadet Corps and the School for Orphans of the Merchant Navy. The British Embassy in Washington received letters of thanks from some of the donors whose weapons were returned. Despite this, some ACDBH donors petitioned the American Congress after the end of the war for the return of their firearms.

== See also ==
- United Kingdom home front during World War II

== Bibliography ==
- Atkin, Malcolm (April 30, 2019). "The American Committee for the Defense of British Homes". To the Last Man: The Home Guard in War & Popular Culture. Pen and Sword. ISBN 978-1-5267-4594-1.
- Bakal, Carl (1966). The Right to Bear Arms. McGraw-Hill.
- Cullen, Stephen (February 29, 2012). In Search of the Real Dad's Army: The Home Guard and the Defence of the United Kingdom 1940–1944. Pen and Sword. ISBN 978-1-84884-269-4.
- Leebaert, Derek (November 1, 2018). The World After the War: America Confronts the British Superpower, 1945–1957. Oneworld Publications. ISBN 978-1-78607-097-5.
- Philbrick, Stephanie (2005). "The American Committee for the Defense of British Homes". Maine History. 42 (2): 93–96.
- Tillman, Barrett (September 2020). "'The Few' Four Score On". Military History: 22–31.
