= Ralph Camroux Morris =

British army officer & coffee planter (1895-1977)

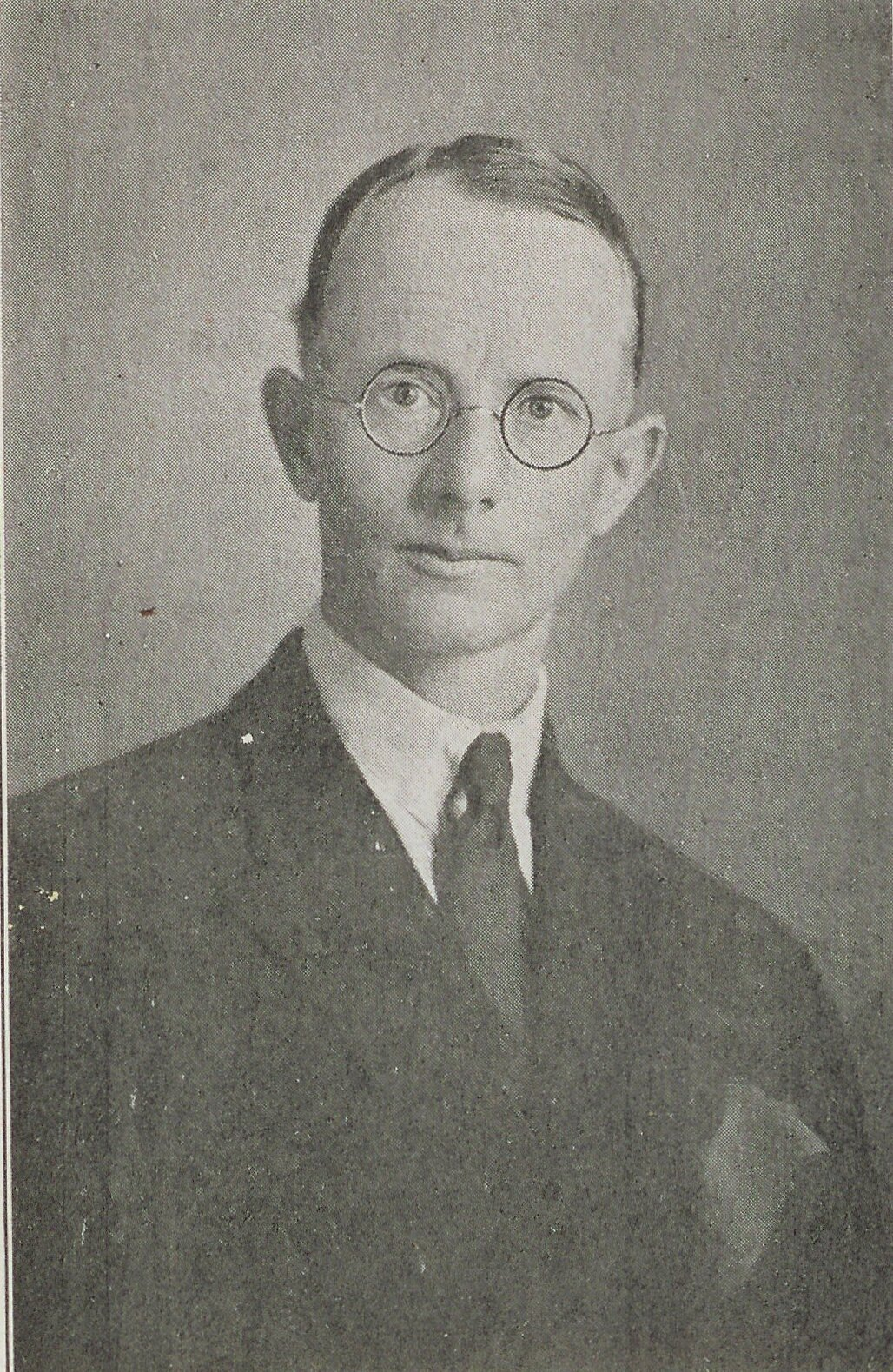
- Portrait from “Indian Wild Life” (1936) which he edited
- Born: 3 March 1895; Attikan estate
- Died: 19 December 1977 (aged 82)
- Known for: Hunting natural history coffee planting wildlife conservation
- Spouse: Heather née Kinloch
- Parents: Randolph Hayton Morris (father); Mabel Camroux (mother)

Colonel Randolph "Ralph" Camroux Morris (3 March 1895 – 19 December 1977, London) was a coffee planter, British Army officer, and hunter-naturalist who was born in India. A pioneer of wildlife conservation in India, a member of the Bombay Natural History Society, he also represented South Indian Europeans in the Indian parliament after 1947. Along with Jim Corbett and Hasan Abid Jafry, he organized an all-India conference for the preservation of wildlife in 1936. Morris was among the first to make use of electric fences to protect crops from elephants and other wildlife in India. He was a member of the first Indian Wildlife Board which made efforts to establish laws to conserve wildlife in post-Independence India.

== Biography ==
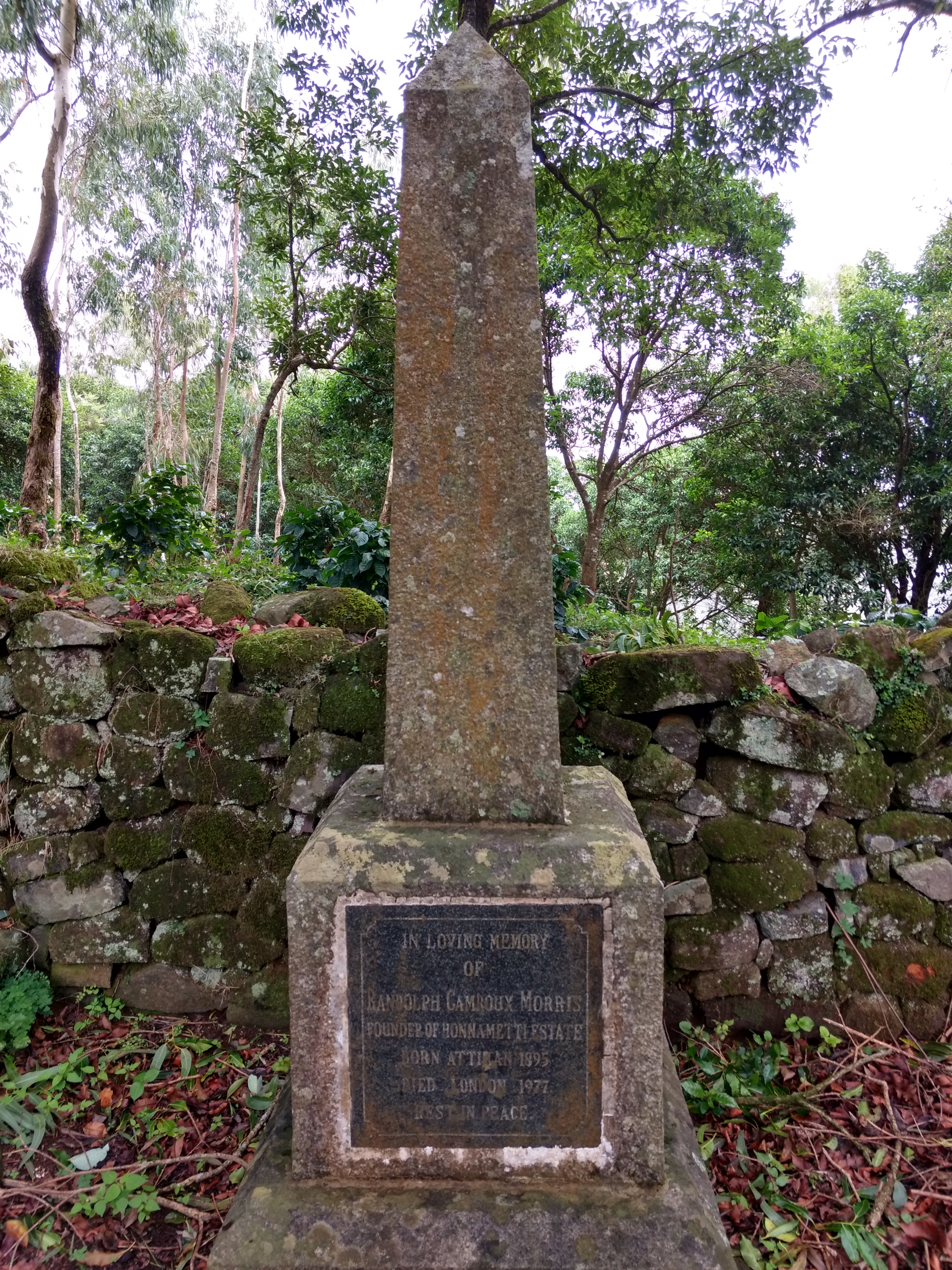
Memorials and family graves in Bellaji

Ralph was born in Attikan estate in the Biligirirangan Hills, the son of Mabel Camroux and Randolph Hayton Morris. Morris Sr. was the son of an Perthshire church rector who left home at the age of 18 to work on a ship. He landed in India in 1877 at a time of famine and worked at various estates before starting the first coffee plantation in the Biligirirangans, an area he identified while out hunting. Morris Sr. was a friend of G. P. Sanderson. Ralph was sent to study in England at Blue Coat School and at Blundell's in Devon before returning to join his father at the estate. In 1895, his father was gored by a wounded gaur while out hunting. He was taken to Mysore and survived but died in 1918 from pneumonia in the one lung that remained. Ralph became a member of the Bombay Natural History Society in 1919, the same year in which he married Heather, daughter of another BNHS member Angus M. Kinloch, who lived in Kotagiri in the Nilgiris. In 1935, Ralph joined the Vernay-Hopwood expedition, sponsored by Arthur S. Vernay, to the Upper Chindwin of Burma. Another expedition was made into the Malay jungles in the same year in search of the Javan Rhinoceros. He was a President of the United Planters' Association of Southern India (UPASI) for one and half years in 1937-38 before joining as a volunteer officer in the war (Indian Army Reserve of Officers). He served in the Middle East and North Africa, seeing action at the Siege of Tobruk. He returned after the war to work at his estate and extended it to Honnametti. After Independence, he represented the South Indian Europeans in the Legislative Assembly. In 1955 he sold off his estate to the Birla family and settled in the UK.

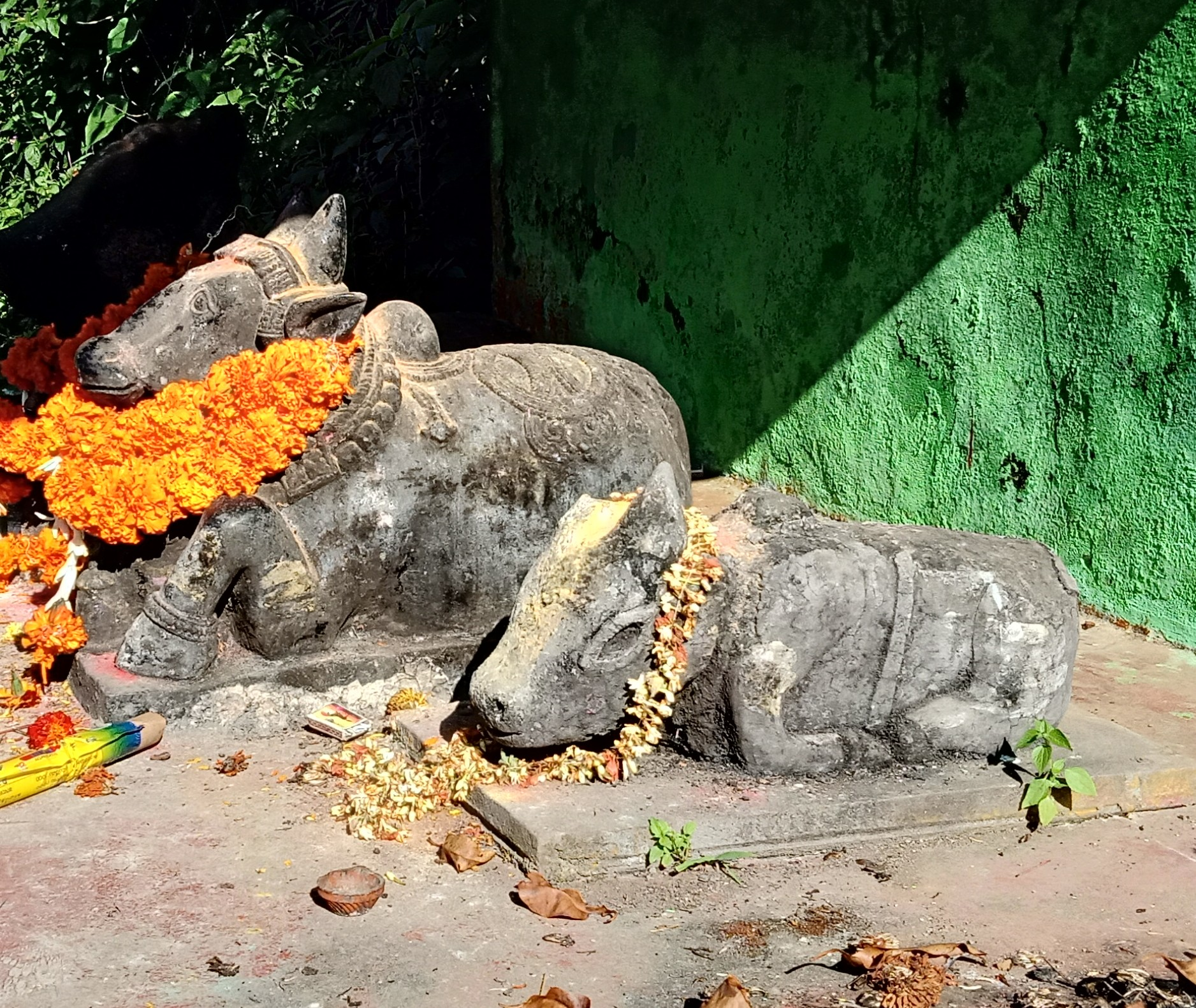
Kaati Basava - a shrine that marks the spot where Randolph Hayton Morris was gored by a gaur R.C. Morris (left), Arthur S. Vernay (centre, seated on the elephant's leg) and J.C. Faunthorpe with a bull elephant shot in the Biligirirangans that is now in the American Museum of Natural History (1923)

He documented the wildlife of the region in the Journal of the Bombay Natural History Society. His estate was visited by numerous people including Leslie Coleman, Victor Brooke, Arthur S. Vernay, John Faunthorpe, Kenneth Anderson, the ornithologist Salim Ali, as well as the Maharaja of Mysore.

In 1933, a fellow sportsman and friend Major Leonard Mourant Handley wrote a book called "Hunter's Moon" with a chapter on "The Great Blue Hills of Ranga" which was reviewed by Morris (under his initials "R.C.M.") in the Journal of the Bombay Natural History Society who stated that "there should surely be some limit to the inaccuracies which find their way into modern books, which purport to set forth observations of interest to natural scientists and Shikaris." Morris found 38 inaccuracies and Handley filed a case of libel in Middlesex and was awarded a damage of 3000 pounds in 1937. Morris never attended the trial and it was suggested the friction between the two former friends arose from differences between Mrs Morris and Mrs Handley.

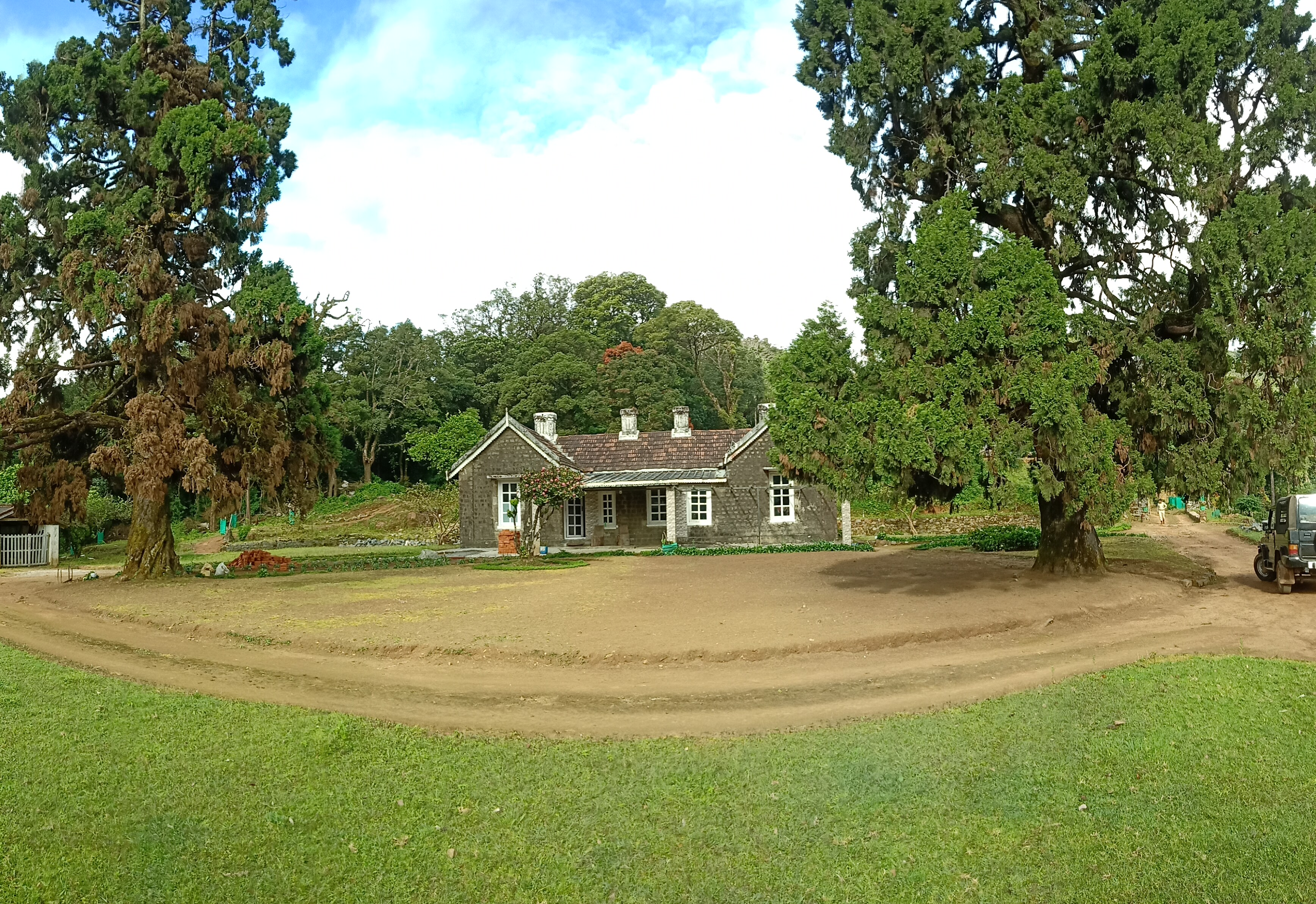
Attikan bungalow

The secretary of the Bombay Natural History Society noted in volume 51 of the journal:

At the request of the Kashmir Government, who desired expert advice for rehabilitation of their badly depleted wild life Messrs. Salim Ali and R. C. Morris visited Kashmir as the Society's representative in October 1952. They surveyed the various game sanctuaries and submitted a report recommending suitable measures which it is hoped are being duly implemented by the authorities. He was a member of the first sittings of the Indian Board of Wildlife.

A species of flying squirrel is named after Morris, Olisthomys morrisi, which was collected during the Vernay-Hopwood Chindwin Expedition.

In 1994, one of Ralph's three daughters Monica Jackson, a mountaineer and anthropologist, reflected on her roots in a book called Going Back.

== Writings ==
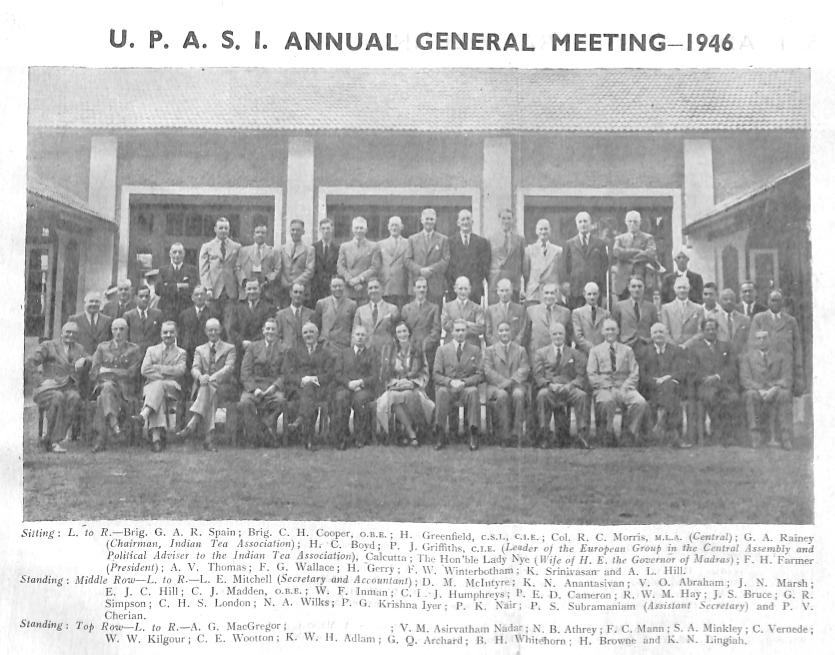
At the 1946 UPASI meeting. R.C. Morris sitting fourth from left

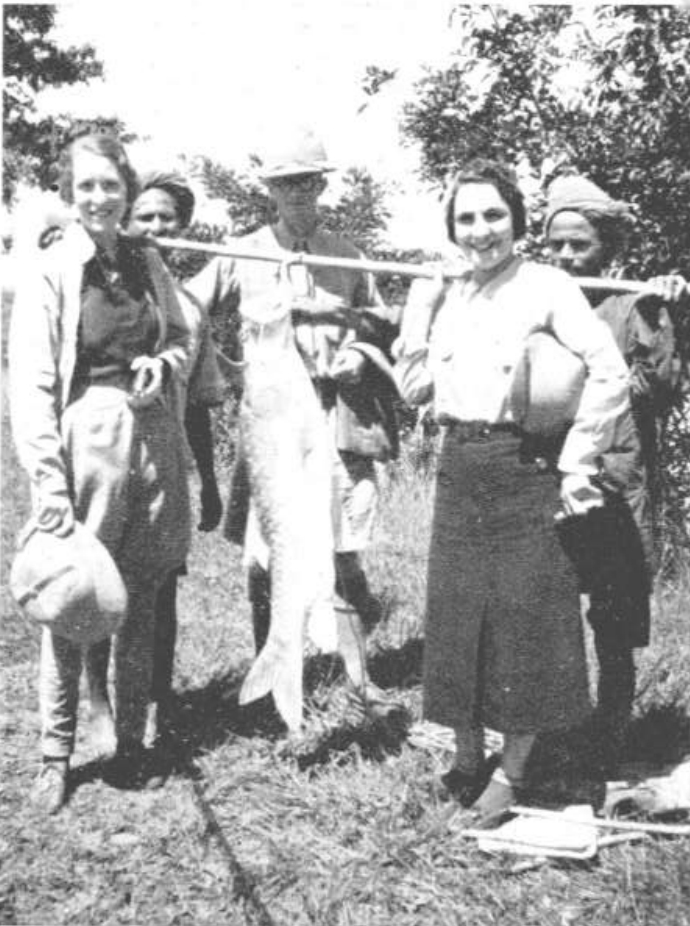
Morris with mahseer along with Heather (left), c. 1936

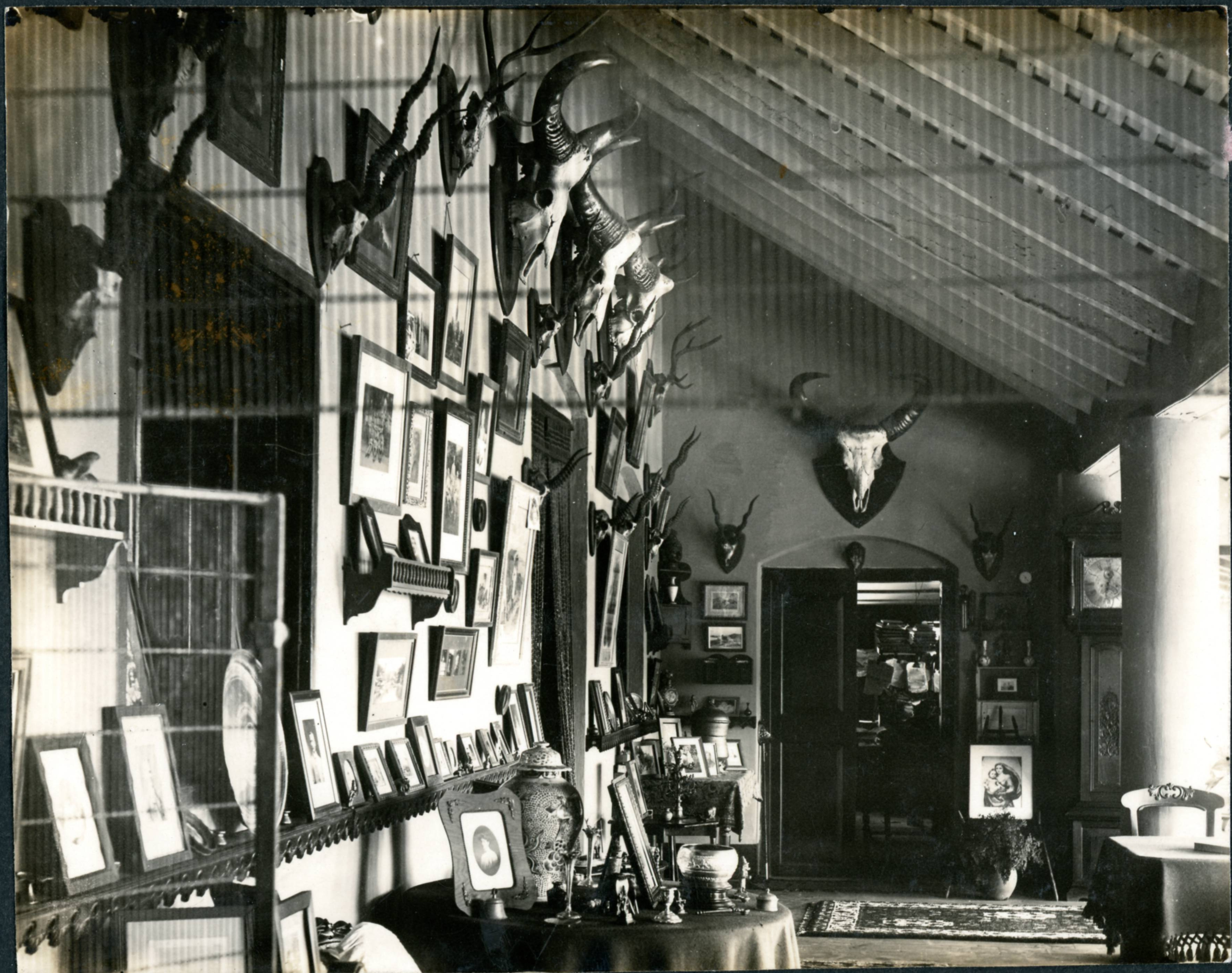
Portico of home with trophies, c. 1930

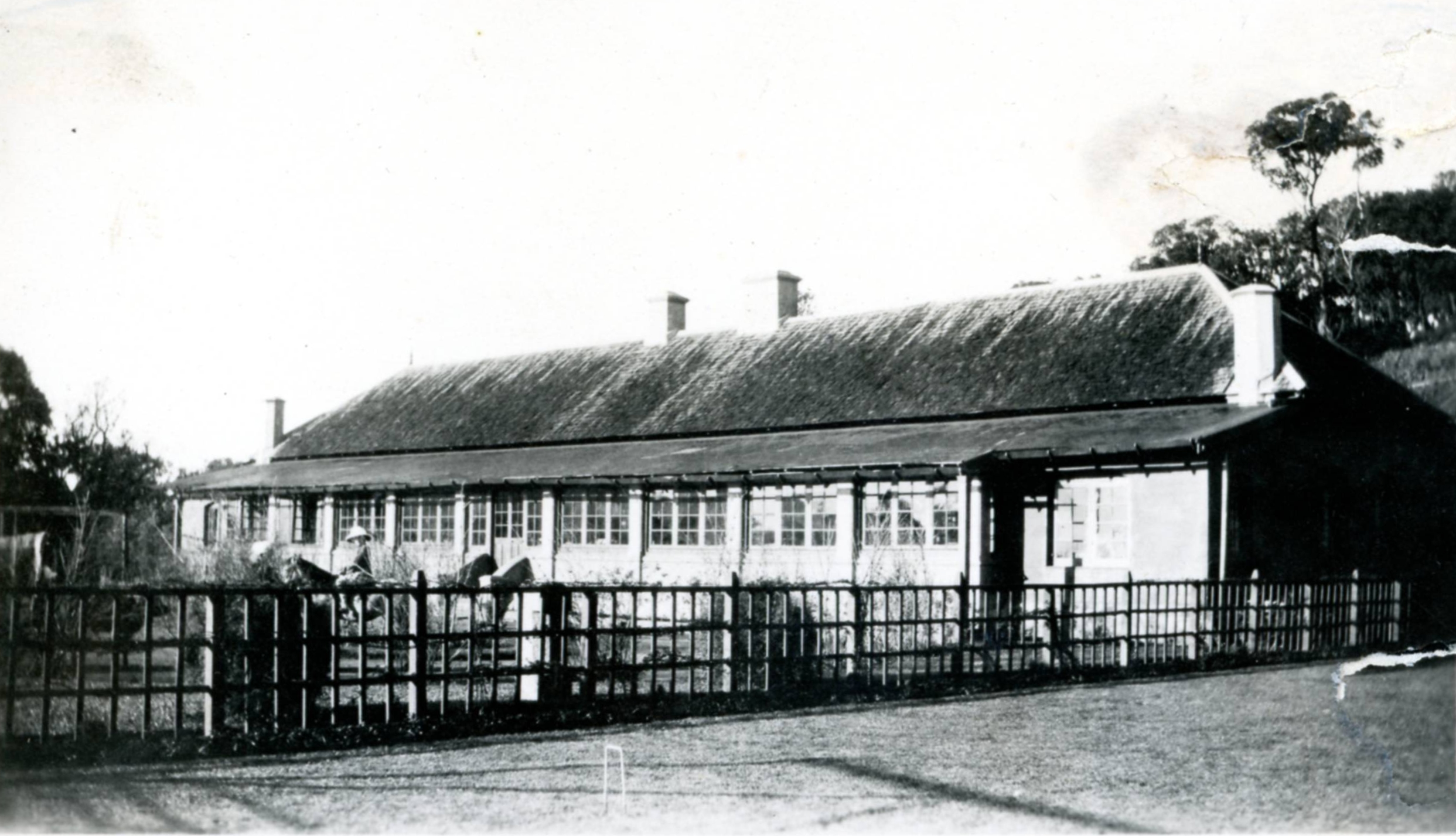
Honnametti bungalow, c. 1930

Morris contributed notes mainly to the journal of the Bombay Natural History Society. He also served as an editor and contributor to the short-lived “Indian Wild Life” magazine published by the ‘All India Conference for the Preservation of Wild Life’ from 1936 to 1939, ceasing due to the outbreak of World War II.

- 1922: Panthers and artificial light. J. Bombay Nat. Hist. Soc. 28(3):789.
- 1924: Indian wild dogs attacking a bear. J. Bombay Nat. Hist. Soc. 30(1):218-219.
- 1925: Wild dogs and jungle tragedies. J. Bombay Nat. Hist. Soc. 30(3):691-693.
- 1925: "Wild animals of Central India". J. Bombay Nat. Hist. Soc. 30(3):694-696.
- 1926: Record of a death from the bite of a hamadryad or king cobra (Naia hanna). J. Bombay Nat. Hist. Soc. 31(1):226.
- 1926: A wonderful sight. J. Bombay Nat. Hist. Soc. 31(2):513-514.
- 1926: An elephant shoot on the Baragur Hills (Coimbatore District). J. Bombay Nat. Hist. Soc. 31(3):720-725.
- 1927: The sense of smell in Indian Felidae. J. Bombay Nat. Hist. Soc. 33(3):695.
- 1929: Are there more than one species of panther in India? J. Bombay Nat. Hist. Soc. 33(3):697-698.
- 1929: Proportion of the sexes in tigers. J. Bombay Nat. Hist. Soc. 33(4):972.
- 1929: Wounded panther returning to "kill". J. Bombay Nat. Hist. Soc. 33(4):977-978.
- 1930: Encounters with elephants on the Biligirirangana Hills. J. Bombay Nat. Hist. Soc. 34(1):237-242.
- 1930: Elephant tusk wedged in a tree. J. Bombay Nat. Hist. Soc. 34(1):242.
- 1930: Partial disappearance of the wild pig (Sus cristatus). J. Bombay Nat. Hist. Soc. 34(1):245-246.
- 1930: An experience with a tigress. J. Bombay Nat. Hist. Soc. 34(2):556-557.
- 1930: Tigers eating their young. J. Bombay Nat. Hist. Soc. 34(2):557.
- 1930: Hyaenas killing cattle tied up as bait. J. Bombay Nat. Hist. Soc. 34(2):561.
- 1930: Panther climbing up to a machan. J. Bombay Nat. Hist. Soc. 34(3):797.
- 1930: Sounds made by porcupines. J. Bombay Nat. Hist. Soc. 34(3):799-800.
- 1930: Observations on the Indian Elephant. J. Bombay Nat. Hist. Soc. 34(3):800-801.
- 1930: On distinguishing between males and females and other controversial matters pertaining to the gaur (Bibos gaurus). J. Bombay Nat. Hist. Soc. 34(3):801-802.
- 1930: Heart shot in game. J. Bombay Nat. Hist. Soc. 34(3):804-805.
- 1931: The Indian wild dog (Cuon dukhunensis). J. Bombay Nat. Hist. Soc. 34(4):1054-1055.
- 1932: Use of artificial light in panther shooting. J. Bombay Nat. Hist. Soc. 35(4):887-888.
- 1932: Vitality of bison mauled by a tiger. J. Bombay Nat. Hist. Soc. 35(4):888-889.
- 1932: Unerupted tusks of elephants. J. Bombay Nat. Hist. Soc. 35(4):889-891.
- 1932: Game preserves and flashlight photography. J. Bombay Nat. Hist. Soc. 35(4):891.
- 1932: Panther feeding on tiger `kills’. J. Bombay Nat. Hist. Soc. 36(3):742.
- 1933: Wild dogs killing a panther. J. Bombay Nat. Hist. Soc. 36(3):744.
- 1933: Wild dogs driving a panther from its `kill’. J. Bombay Nat. Hist. Soc. 36(3):744-745.
- 1933: A newly born bison calf. J. Bombay Nat. Hist. Soc. 36(3):746.
- 1933: Game preserves and flashlight. J. Bombay Nat. Hist. Soc. 36(3):746-748.
- 1933: Spirited old bull bison (Bibos gaurus). J. Bombay Nat. Hist. Soc. 36(4):984-985.
- 1933: The colour of `White Bison’ (Bibos gaurus): (Comment). J. Bombay Nat. Hist. Soc. 36(4):985-986.
- 1934: Bison sanatorium. J. Bombay Nat. Hist. Soc. 37(2):483.
- 1934: White bison. J. Bombay Nat. Hist. Soc. 37(2):483-484.
- 1934: Growth and shedding of antlers in sambar (Rusa unicolor) and Cheetal (Axis axis) in South India. J. Bombay Nat. Hist. Soc. 37: (2):484.
- 1934: A tailless tiger. J. Bombay Nat. Hist. Soc. 37(3):721.
- 1934: Death of an elephant (Elephas maximus Linn.) while calfing. J. Bombay Nat. Hist. Soc. 37(3):722.
- 1934: Death of 14 elephants (Elephas maximus Linn.) by food poisoning. J. Bombay Nat. Hist. Soc. 37(3): 722-723.
- 1935: Tigers killing solitary bull bison (Bibos gaurus). J. Bombay Nat. Hist. Soc. 38(1):179.
- 1935: Vultures feeding at night. J. Bombay Nat. Hist. Soc. 38(1):190.
- 1936: Tigers versus bison. J. Bombay Nat. Hist. Soc. 38(3):609.
- 1936: Further records of the distribution of the cheetah (Acinonyx jubatus Erxl.) in South India. J. Bombay Nat. Hist. Soc. 38(3):610.
- 1936: The birth of an elephant calf. J. Bombay Nat. Hist. Soc. 38:613-614.
- 1936: The formation and absence of tusks in elephants. J. Bombay Nat. Hist. Soc .38(3):615-617.
- 1936: Early development of antlers by sambhur in the Biligirirangana Hills, South India. J. Bombay Nat. Hist. Soc. 38(3):619.
- 1936: The Vernay-Hopwood Upper Chindwin Expedition. J. Bombay Nat. Hist. Soc. 38:647-671.
- 1936: Melanism in wild dogs. J. Bombay Nat. Hist. Soc. 38(4):813.
- 1936: Bison and panther. J. Bombay Nat. Hist. Soc. 38(4):818.
- 1936: Season of horn development in sambhur. J. Bombay Nat. Hist. Soc.38(4):819-820.
- 1937: Peculiar behaviour of an elephant. J. Bombay Nat. Hist. Soc. 39(1):164-165.
- 1937: White bison. J. Bombay Nat. Hist. Soc. 39(1):165.
- 1937: Ravages by tiger and incidence of man-eaters in North Coimbatore between 1860-1880. J. Bombay Nat. Hist. Soc. 39(2):382-385.
- 1937: The result of excess poison for wild dogs. J. Bombay Nat. Hist. Soc. 39(2):388.
- 1937: A very large sambar stag. J. Bombay Nat. Hist. Soc. 39(2):390.
- 1937: Gaur bulls attacking a wounded bull. J. Bombay Nat. Hist. Soc. 39(2):391.
- 1937: Two wary tigers and two others. J. Bombay Nat. Hist. Soc. 39(3):610-614.
- 1937: Mange on wild dogs. J. Bombay Nat. Hist. Soc. 39(3):615-616.
- 1937: Solitary bull bison (Bibos gaurus H. Sm.). J. Bombay Nat. Hist. Soc. 39(3):617.
- 1937: Colouration of the bison's snout and tongue. J. Bombay Nat. Hist. Soc. 39(3):618.
- 1937: Close seasons for big game-are they beneficial. J. Bombay Nat. Hist. Soc. 39(4):621.
- 1938: Measurements of tigers. J. Bombay Nat. Hist. Soc. 40:114-115.
- 1938: Disappearance of jackals. J. Bombay Nat. Hist. Soc. 40:117.
- 1938: On whistling of bison. J. Bombay Nat. Hist. Soc. 40:117.
- 1938: Behaviour of gaur or Indian bison. J. Bombay Nat. Hist. Soc. 40:325.
- 1938: Measurements of tiger, panther, bison and sambhur. J. Bombay Nat. Hist. Soc. 40(3):555.
- 1938: `Stamping grounds’ and `sore neck’ in sambhur. J. Bombay Nat. Hist. Soc. 40(3):560-561.
- 1938: A natural history tale. J. Bombay Nat. Hist. Soc. 40(3):581.
- 1939: On the occurrence of the Banded Crake (Rallus eurizonoides amuroptera) and the Malabar Woodpecker (Macropicus javensis hodgsoni) in the Billigirirangan Hills, S. India. J. Bombay Nat. Hist. Soc. 40(4):763.
- 1941: An appeal: Society for the preservation of the fauna of the empire. J. Bombay Nat. Hist. Soc. 42(3):653.
- 1941: Unusual behaviour of panthers and tigers. J. Bombay Nat. Hist. Soc. 42(3):655-656.
- 1941: Elephants lying down. J. Bombay Nat. Hist. Soc. 42(3):658.
- 1941: Bed bugs and swifts. J. Bombay Nat. Hist. Soc. 42(3):664-665.
- 1942: Widespread rabies among wild dogs on the Biligirirangana Hills (S. India). J. Bombay Nat. Hist. Soc. 43(1):100.
- 1943: Jackals attacking deer in Ceylon. J. Bombay Nat. Hist. Soc. 44(3):585.
- 1946: Rarity of man-eating tigers in South India. J. Bombay Nat. Hist. Soc. 46(1):177-178.
- 1946: Death of a panther on a tiger's kill. J. Bombay Nat. Hist. Soc. 46(1):179-180.
- 1947: “Record elephant”. J. Bombay Nat. Hist. Soc. 46(3):541.
- 1947: Death of six elephants. J. Bombay Nat. Hist. Soc. 46(3):541-542
- 1947: Destruction of cattle by tiger en masse. J. Bombay Nat. Hist. Soc. 46(4):714.
- 1947: Weight of bull bison. J. Bombay Nat. Hist. Soc. 47(1):153.
- 1952: Abnormal clavicle bones in Tigers. J. Bombay Nat. Hist. Soc. 47(4):715.
- 1950: Tiger eating panther. J. Bombay Nat. Hist. Soc. 48(4):802.
- 1950: Charge by unwounded bison. J. Bombay Nat. Hist. Soc. 48(4):803-804.
- 1951: Protecting food crops from wild animals. J. Bombay Nat. Hist. Soc. 49(4):783.
- 1951: Jeep versus elephant. J. Bombay Nat. Hist. Soc. 49(4):783-784.
- 1952: Riotous behaviour of mating bears (Melursus ursinus). J. Bombay Nat. Hist. Soc. 51(1):265-266.
- 1952: Case of unwounded gaur or Indian bison (Bibos gaurus) charging. J. Bombay Nat. Hist. Soc. 51(1):266.
- 1952: Our vanishing wildlife. J. Bombay Nat. Hist. Soc. 51(1):268-269.
- 1953: Domestic poultry diseases now endemic in jungle. J. Bombay Nat. Hist. Soc. 51(3):747-748.
- with Salim Ali (1956): Game preservation in Kashmir: Report and recommendation of the Bombay Natural History Society, s delegation October 1952. J. Bombay Nat. Hist. Soc. 53(2):229-233.
- 1954: An elephant's stride. J. Bombay Nat. Hist. Soc. 50(3&4):933.
- 1956: Tusks of Indian Elephants. J. Bombay Nat. Hist. Soc. 54(2):460.
- 1958: Porcupines and trees of Vernonia sp. J. Bombay Nat. Hist. Soc. 55(1):155-156.
- 1958: Rabbits and Myxomatosis in the UK. J. Bombay Nat. Hist. Soc. 55(1):156.
- 1958: Flowering of Strobilanthes. J. Bombay Nat. Hist. Soc. 55(1):185.
- 1958: Note on the use of bamboo gun rocket for scaring wild animals out of cultivation. J. Bombay Nat. Hist. Soc. 55(2):344-345.
- 1958: Rat snake `mating’. J. Bombay Nat. Hist. Soc. 55(2):366.
