= Spottail barb =

Conservation status
- Least Concern (IUCN 3.1)

Scientific classification
- Kingdom: Animalia
- Phylum: Chordata
- Class: Actinopterygii
- Order: Cypriniformes
- Family: Cyprinidae
- Subfamily: Smiliogastrinae
- Genus: Enteromius
- Species: E. afrovernayi

Binomial name
- Enteromius afrovernayi Nichols & Boulton (fi), 1927

Synonyms
- Barbus vernayi Nichols & Boulton, 1927; Barbus afrovernayi Nichols & Boulton, 1927

Species of fish

Spottail barb (Enteromius afrovernayi) is a species of ray-finned fish in the genus Enteromius. It has a wide distribution in western central Africa and is found from the Democratic Republic of Congo south through Angola, Zambia northern Namibia, Botswana and Zimbabwe.

The fish is named in honor of Arthur S. Vernay (1877–1960), an art and antiques dealer, who as a big game hunter and naturalist-explorer, funded and led an American Museum of Natural History expedition to the African country of Angola.
