= Roosevelt's muntjac =

Conservation status
- Data Deficient (IUCN 3.1)

Scientific classification
- Kingdom: Animalia
- Phylum: Chordata
- Class: Mammalia
- Order: Artiodactyla
- Family: Cervidae
- Genus: Muntiacus
- Species: M. rooseveltorum

Binomial name
- Muntiacus rooseveltorum Osgood, 1932
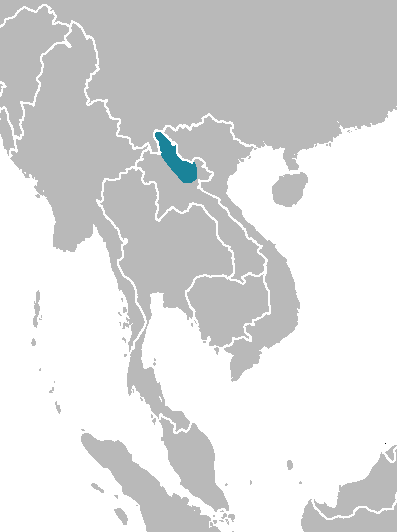

Species of deer

A single specimen of the Roosevelt's muntjac or Roosevelt's barking deer (Muntiacus rooseveltorum) was presented to the Field Museum in 1929 following the Kelley-Roosevelts expedition organized by Theodore (Jnr) and Kermit Roosevelt. The specimen is slightly smaller than the common muntjac and DNA testing has shown it to be distinct from recently discovered muntjac species. It is a subspecies of Fea's muntjac, whose home range is mountains further northwest separated by lower land. However, without further evidence, the exact position of Roosevelt's muntjac cannot be stated. Berlin Zoo supposedly held this species between 1961 and 1972 (following an import from Northern Vietnam) but it could have been an Indian muntjac, subspecies annamensis.

Roosevelt's muntjac was believed to have been extinct since 1929. However, there have been several recent claims to have rediscovered the species, from evidence including skulls owned by villagers in the Truong Son (Annamite) mountains of northern Laos and far northwestern Vietnam. More recently, photographs from a camera trap at Xuan Lien Nature Reserve in Vietnam appear to have identified two individuals.
