= Arthur Stannard Vernay =

American antiques dealer and big-game hunter (1877–1960)

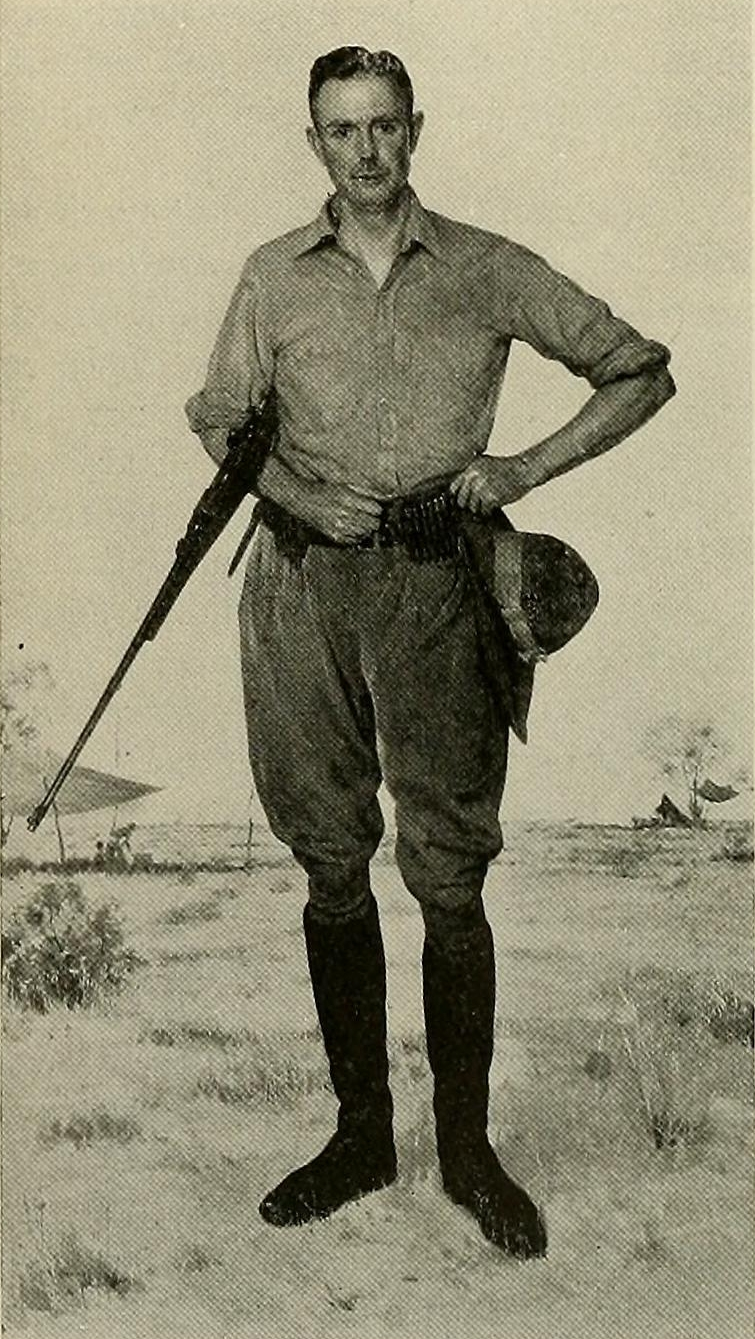
Arthur S. Vernay c. 1923

Arthur Stannard Vernay (11 May 1877 – 25 October 1960) was a noted English-born American art and antiques dealer, decorator, big-game hunter, and naturalist explorer. He sponsored and took part in expeditions across the world to collect biological specimens and cultural artifacts on behalf of the American Museum of Natural History. The Vernay-Faunthorpe Hall of South Asian mammals in the AMNH is named after him.

== Early life ==
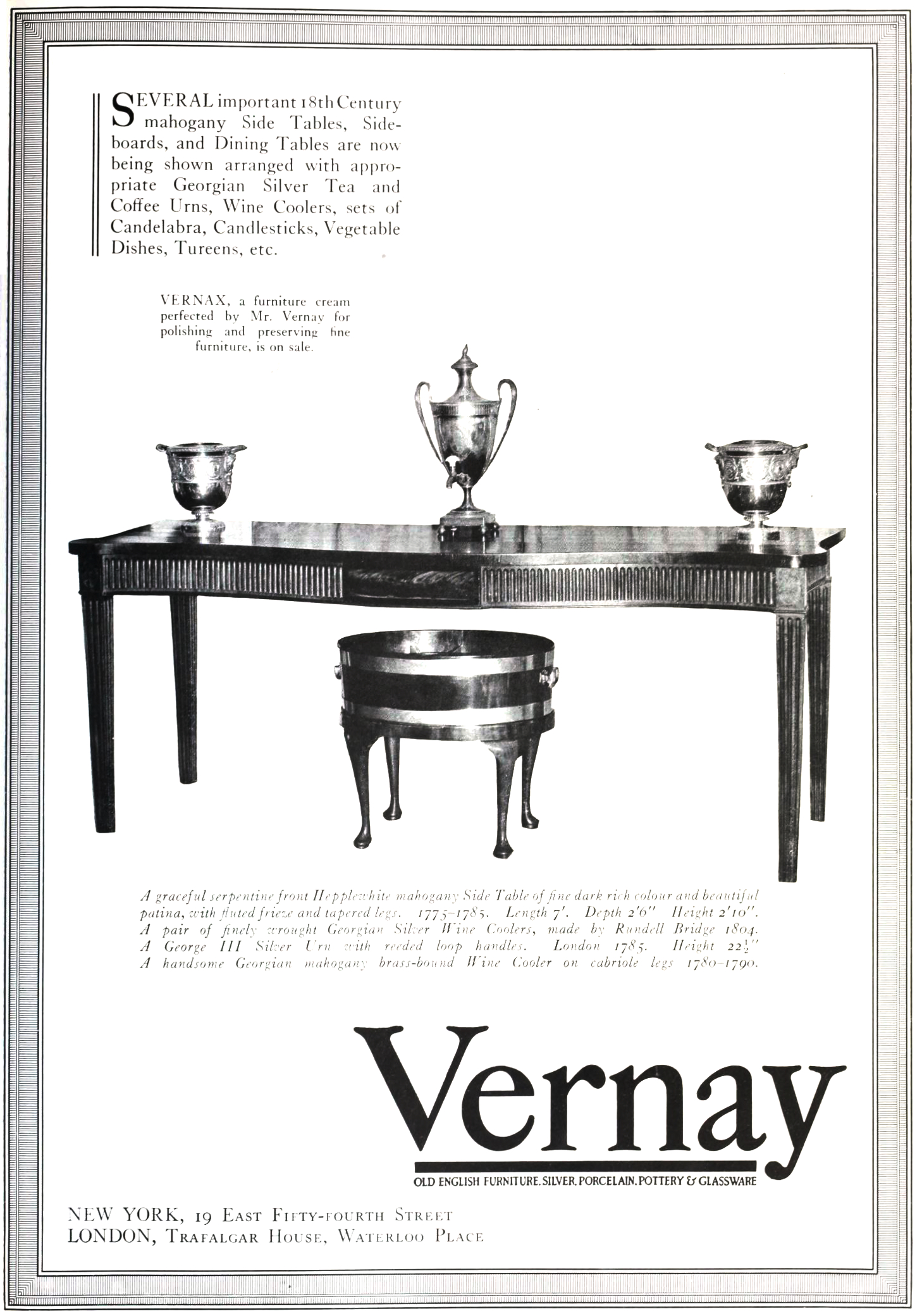
Advertisement for Vernay's store in Country Life (1916)

Born in Weymouth, England, Vernay was born to Louisa Stannard and Thomas Crabb Avant. Shortly after his parents divorced, he emigrated to New York in August 1904 and changed his surname from Avant to Vernay. He found a job as an elevator operator at a furniture store known as A.J. Crawfords and after working there briefly, Vernay started his own shop in 1906, called Arthur S. Vernay, Inc. located at 1 East 45th Street, near Madison Avenue. He also had a shop in London at 217 Piccadilly in the late 1910s to 1920s. He sold antiques and decorative artworks to a number of important and influential New Yorkers including Ogden Codman Jr., Elsie de Wolfe, Sir Charles Carrick Allom, Consuelo Vanderbilt, Francis Patrick Garvan, Benjamin Altman, Solomon R. Guggenheim, William Russell Grace, as well as leading art dealerships such as M Knoedler & Co, and the design firm Tiffany Studios. From the 1920s to the early 1940s, he had a shop at 19 East 54th Street in New York.

== Travel and hunting ==
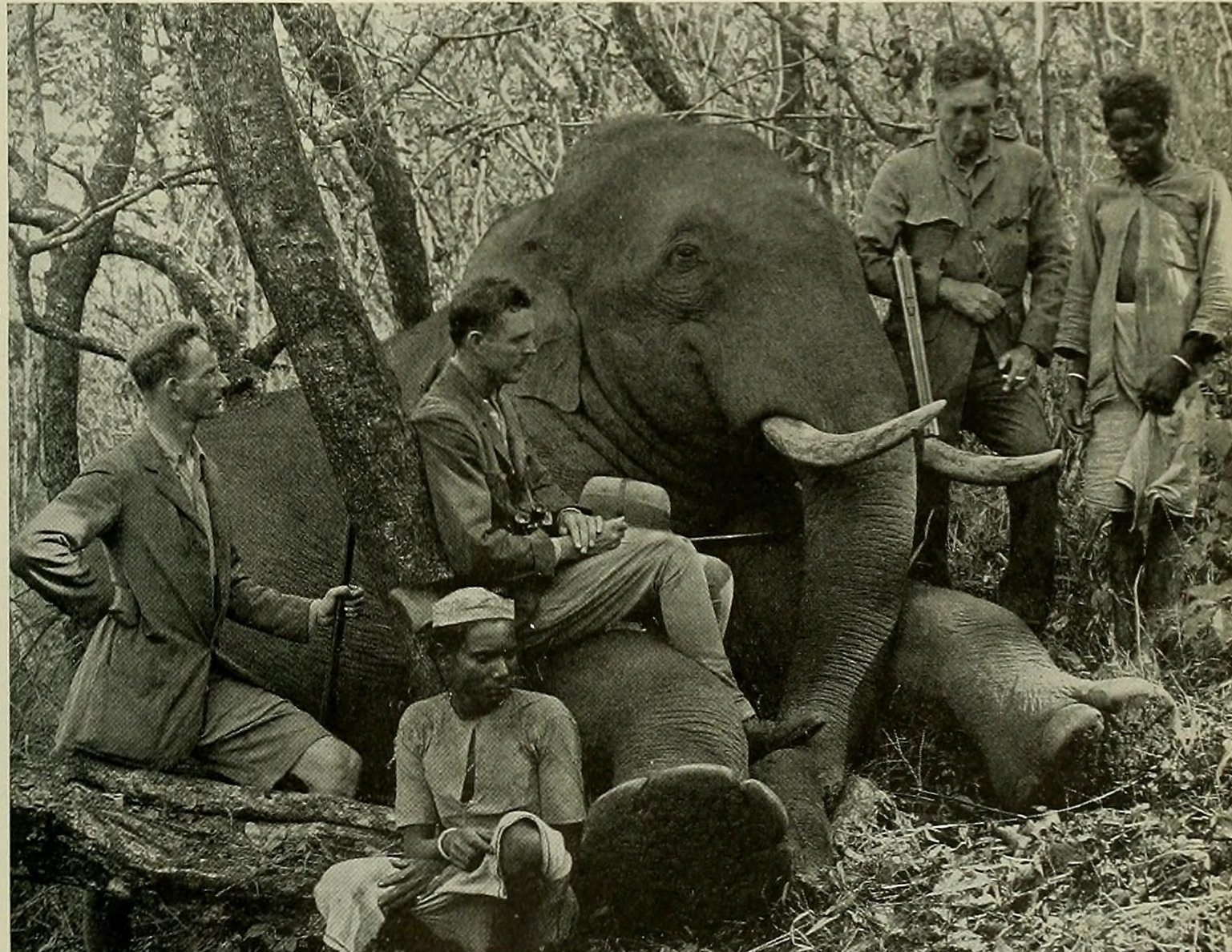
Vernay seated on elephant shot in the Biligirirangan Hills (1923) which is now in the South Asia hall of the AMNH

In the 1920s, Vernay grew increasingly interested in game hunting and naturalist exploration. In 1921 he stayed at the Biligirirangans with Ralph Camroux Morris and saw wild animals in nature for the first time. He returned to the US and then sponsored a collecting expedition led by Colonel John Champion Faunthorpe intended to enhance the American Museum of Natural History's collection of Southeast Asian animals, Vernay joined Faunthorpe in India in 1923. This expedition culminated in the American Museum of Natural History's Vernay-Faunthorpe Hall of South Asiatic Mammals, which opened in 1930 and held mounted elephants shot by the collectors in Mysore. He was elected Vice Patron of the Bombay Natural History Society in 1928. Vernay shot the rare Javan rhinoceros near Telok Anson in 1932 along with Guy Rowley while searching for Schomburg's deer. It was the last of its species in Perak. In 1935 he became a trustee of the American Museum of Natural History and in the same year he accompanied Charles Suydam Cutting to Tibet where they met the Dalai Lama. His last expedition was to Africa in 1946. Around the same time he became very interested in orchids.

== Bahamas ==
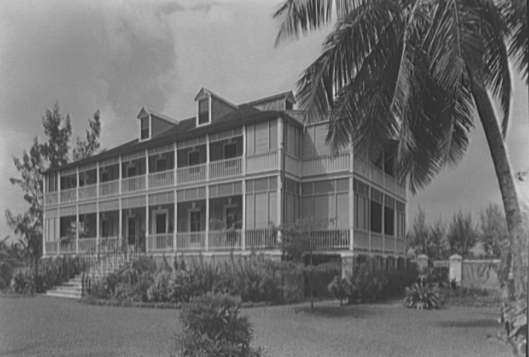
Vernay's home in Los Cayos, Nassau (1939)

Vernay sold off his company in the 1940s (it was then run by Stephen Jussel) and moved to Nassau, Bahamas, where he cultivated an orchid greenhouse, collected species from South America, participated in environmental conservation efforts, co-founding the Bahamas National Trust and the Society for the Preservation of the Flamingo. In the Bahamas, Vernay lived with his wife Marion Woodruff Kelley (married 1908) at their home, Los Cayos, and was part of an expatriate social community that included the Duke of Windsor and Duchess of Windsor, the Swedish entrepreneur Axel Wenner-Gren, and hosted the English author Ian Fleming when he visited the Bahamas in 1956 before writing both Dr. No and Thunderball. Fleming accompanied Vernay and Robert Cushman Murphy along with his friend and OSS agent Ivar Felix Bryce, to Inagua which had the largest flamingo colony in the world.

== Expeditions ==
The major expeditions sponsored by Vernay include:

- Faunthorpe-Vernay Expedition to India, 1923
- Vernay-Angola Expedition, 1925
- Vernay-Archbold Expedition to Madagascar, 1929
- Vernay Scientific Survey of the Eastern Ghats (with collectors V.S. LaPersonne and N.A. Baptista), 1929
- Vernay-Lang Kalahari Expedition for Field Museum, 1930–31
- Vernay-Hopwood Upper Chindwin expedition, 1935 (S.F. Hopwood was the chief conservator of forests in Burma)
- Vernay-Cutting Burma Expedition, 1938-39 (with Charles Suydam Cutting)
- Vernay Nyasaland Expedition, 1946

== Eponymy ==
A large number of species and subspecies described from specimens collected on his expeditions have been named after him including the fish Hypsibarbus vernayi, the Spottail Barb Enteromius afrovernayi, the climbing mouse Dendromus vernayi, the rodent genus Vernaya and the Angolan file snake, Mehelya vernayi.

Vernay's business papers are in the Winterthur library through his friend Henry Francis du Pont.
