= Kelley-Roosevelts Asiatic Expedition =

Zoological expedition to Southeast Asia

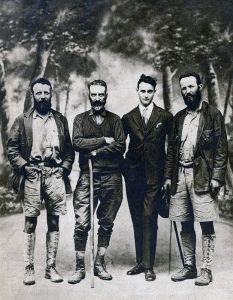
Theodore Roosevelt Jr. (left), Charles Suydam Cutting, and Kermit Roosevelt (right) with U.S. Consul Culver B. Chamberlain in Kunming, Yunnan (1929)

The William V. Kelley-Roosevelt Asiatic Expedition was a zoological expedition to Southeast Asia in 1928–1929 sponsored by the Field Museum of Natural History and organized by Kermit Roosevelt and his brother Theodore Roosevelt Jr.

== Funding and organization ==
William Vallangdiham Kelley (1861–1932), a Field Museum trustee and benefactor, financed the expedition, which was extremely well equipped. There were three separate sections of the expedition — one led by the two Roosevelt brothers, another conducted by the British ornithologist Herbert Stevens, and another led by H. J. Coolidge. The mammalogist W. H. Osgood described the expedition's collection of mammalian skins and designated the Roosevelt brothers' section as the first, Stevens's as the second, and Coolidge's as the third. The first section consisted of the two Roosevelt brothers with the naturalist C. Suydam Cutting and interpreter Jack T. Young.

== Itinerary ==
Stevens accompanied the Roosevelts up the Irrawaddy to the Chinese-Burma border and then in January 1929 went north from Tengyueh with his own caravan. During all of February, he collected specimens at the Lijiang bend. He then moved north to collect in Sichuan and spent May in the Wushi hills. After some further collecting, he went down the Yangtze to Shanghai, sending 2,400 specimens to the Field Museum.

After separating from Stevens's section of the expedition, the Roosevelt brothers, with Suydam Cutting, went rapidly north to collect specimens of the giant panda and other rare mammals. Their party proceeded through Burma to Bhamo, northward to Tatsienlu, and thence to Mouping. Then going southward through Yachow, they crossed the Qingyi (Tung) River and continued their journey traveling slightly east of the Panlong River and reaching the railhead at Yunnanfu. From there, Kermit Roosevelt returned to the United States upon an urgent request. Theodore Roosevelt, Jr. and Cutting continued to the vicinity of Saigon to procure specimens of banteng, seladang, and water buffalo.

The third section of the expedition devoted itself to concentrated work in northern Indo-China, mainly in the province of Tonkin. Under the leadership of Harold J. Coolidge, Jr., a party of four was organized in which Russell W. Hendee was the mammalogist, Josselyn Van Tyne ornithologist, and Ralph E. Wheeler, physician and parasitologist. After a brief stop in Annam, where collections were made near Quangtri, this party proceeded to Haiphong and Hanoi and thence up the valley of the Rivière Noire. They passed on into Northern Laos and worked there from a base at Phong Saly, finally descending the Mekong River with a short stop at Vientiane to Savannaket and thence overland to Hue.

Hendee departed from Coolidge's party in Laos on 14 May 1929 and started down the Mekong to join Theodore Roosevelt, Jr. and Suydam Cutting in Saigon, but shortly after his departure, he suffered a severe attack of malarial fever. Taken to a hospital in Vientiane on June 3, Hendee died on June 6.

== Discoveries and collections ==
Coolidge's section of the expedition discovered a new mammalian species Roosevelt's muntjac and a new avian species Macronus kelleyi.

The expedition brought back several living specimens for the U.S. National Zoological Park:

Through Theodore Roosevelt, jr., Harold S. Coolidge, jr., and Ralph Wheeler, all of the Kelley-Roosevelt expedition, were presented a trio of white-faced gibbons, father, mother, and child, all magnificent specimens; a rare Bay Bamboo rat; a sun bear; a Himalayan bear; as well as several smaller specimens.

The expedition collected approximately 5000 bird skins.

A collection of more than 5000 specimens was gathered by the Kelley-Roosevelts Expedition of the Field Museum, in unexplored regions of Siam, French Indo-China, and the interior of Southern China. The work in China was carried on by Theodore Roosevelt '08, his brother, Kermit Roosevelt '12, and by Suydam Cutting '12. The Indo-China Expedition, led by H. J. Coolidge Jr. '27, included Dr. Ralph E. Wheeler '22, M.D. '26 and Dr. Josselyn Van Tyne '25. These six out of the eight members of the expedition were Harvard men. ... The birds were collected mostly by shooting and by the use of ingenious native traps set in the forest at night. The skins were all prepared in the field, and many of them were transported over a thousand miles down rivers, along mountain trails, in the rainy season, before they could be shipped home. They arrived in perfect condition.

This collection resulted in the identification of five new species of birds. The expedition collected about 2,000 specimens of small mammals and 40 big mammals, including two giant panda skins (a first for Western museum collectors). The Roosevelt brothers shot and collected one panda and purchased a panda skin from a local hunter. The taxidermic panda specimens are on display in the Hall of Asian Mammals in the Field Museum.

== Recounting the expedition ==
The lure of exploration through one of the few remaining corners of the world, which is little known, the Chinese-Tibetan frontier, brought 3,000 persons to the Field Museum yesterday to hear Kermit Roosevelt. Only half of that number heard his lecture, a line of more than 1,500 being turned away when the auditorium was filled to capacity. Slides and motion pictures showed how the William V. Kelley-Roosevelt party abandoned their pack and riding animals and went on foot over mountain passes as high as 17,100 feet in what they thought would be a futile effort to kill a giant panda. Mr. Roosevelt and his brother, Col. Theodore Roosevelt, finally shot one of the animals, which will be placed on exhibit in the museum here. The natives of the nearby village in Lololand, between Tibet and China, held purification rites after the party had shot their prize and taken it through the village. The panda is considered a semi-divinity, and is never killed by the natives.

Kermit and Ted Roosevelt recounted their experiences in their book Trailing the Giant Panda. Part of Suydam Cutting's 1940 book The Fire Ox and Other Years deals with the Kelley-Roosevelts expedition.

The confirmation that the giant panda existed set off a flurry of Western expeditions in the 1930s by big-game hunters, with the goal of acquiring panda skins and stealing cubs for display in American zoos. By the late 1930s, the panda was nearly extinct. The Roosevelt brothers became deeply regretful of their part in the panda's demise and began arguing for reformed attitudes and practices in the scientific community. Kermit became president of the Audubon Society, where he worked for preservation practices.
