= C. Suydam Cutting =

American philanthropist, collector, and explorer (1889–1972)

C. Suydam Cutting CBE
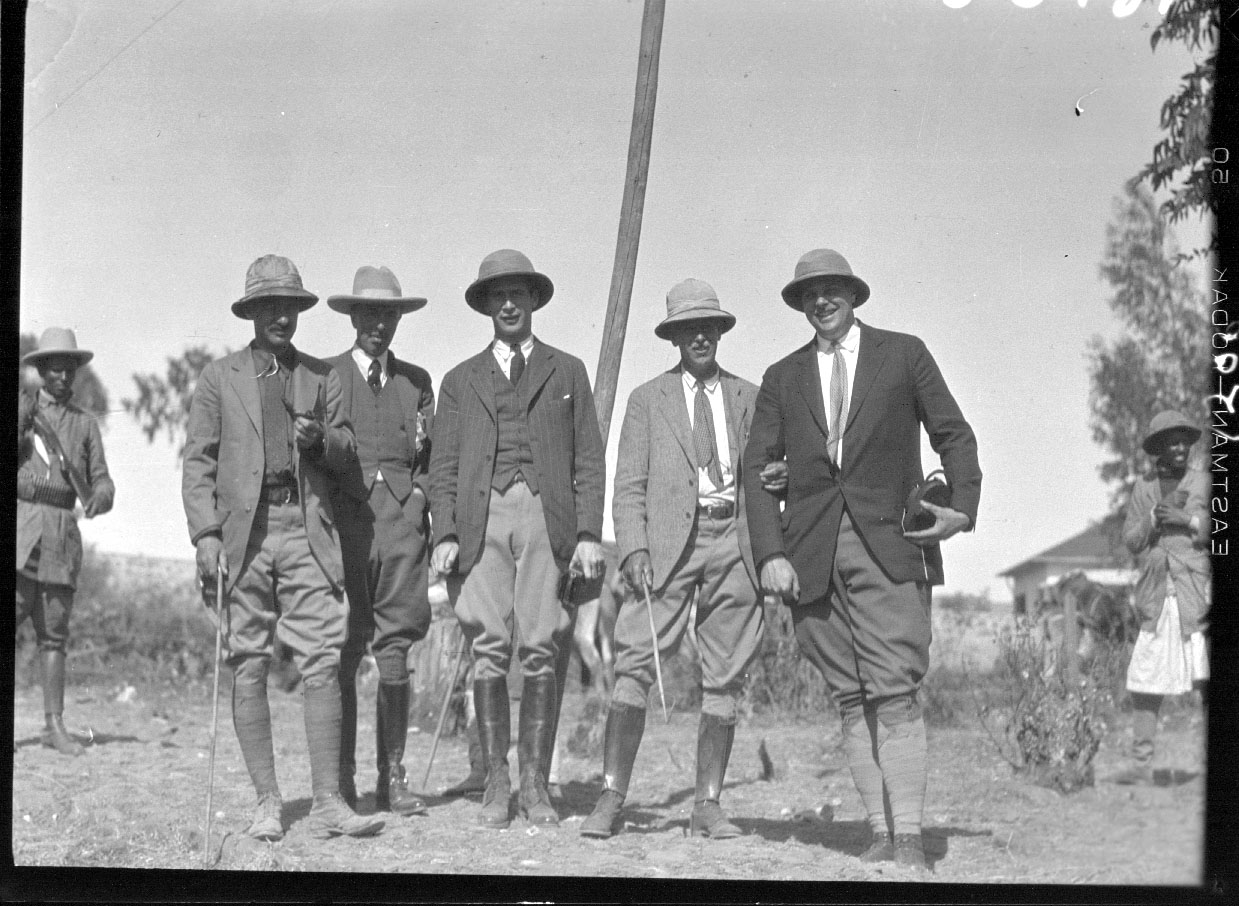
- Cutting (far left), 1927.
- Born: Charles Suydam Cutting; January 17, 1889; New York City, New York, U.S.
- Died: August 24, 1972 (aged 83); Edgartown, Massachusetts
- Education: Groton School; Harvard University
- Spouses: Helen McMahon (m. 1932; died 1961) Mary Percy Pyne Filley (m. 1963)
- Parent(s): Robert Fulton Cutting; Helen Suydam Cutting
- Relatives: Walter Lispenard Suydam (uncle); William Bayard Cutting (uncle)
- Awards: Croix de Guerre; Order of the Black Star

Charles Suydam Cutting, CBE (January 17, 1889 – August 24, 1972) was an explorer, naturalist, society figure, philanthropist, and writer. He travelled around the world on numerous expeditions including the Field Museum-Chicago Daily News Abyssinian, Kelley-Roosevelts Asiatic, and Vernay-Cutting Expeditions. He was among the first Europeans to enter the forbidden city of Lhasa in Tibet and is credited with introducing the Lhasa Apso breed into the United States.

== Early life ==
Cutting was born in New York City on January 17, 1889. He was the son of Robert Fulton Cutting, known as the "first citizen of New York," and Helen (née Suydam) Cutting, who married in 1883. From his father's first marriage, he had an older half-brother, Robert Bayard Cutting, who died in Paris during World War I. Among his full siblings was Helen Suydam Cutting, who married Lucius Kellogg Wilmerding Jr.; Elisabeth McEvers Cutting; Robert Fulton Cutting Jr.; Ruth Hunter Cutting; and Schermerhorn Cutting, who died young.

Among his many prominent family members was his maternal uncle, Walter Lispenard Suydam, and his paternal uncle, William Bayard Cutting. His mother was a granddaughter of Abraham Schermerhorn and a niece of Caroline Schermerhorn, who was married to William Backhouse Astor Jr.

Cutting went to the Groton School and Harvard University, where he graduated in 1912 with an engineering major.

== Career ==
After Harvard, he went into engineering sales with the M. W. Kellogg company. He served in the US Army during both world wars, with the rank of Lieutenant colonel in World War II. Prior to the U.S. joining World War II, he was a prominent advocate of arming Britain via The American Committee for the Defense of British Homes.

Cutting was a member of The Room, a group of high-society amateur spies organized by Vincent Astor who reported to President Franklin Roosevelt.

=== Exploration ===
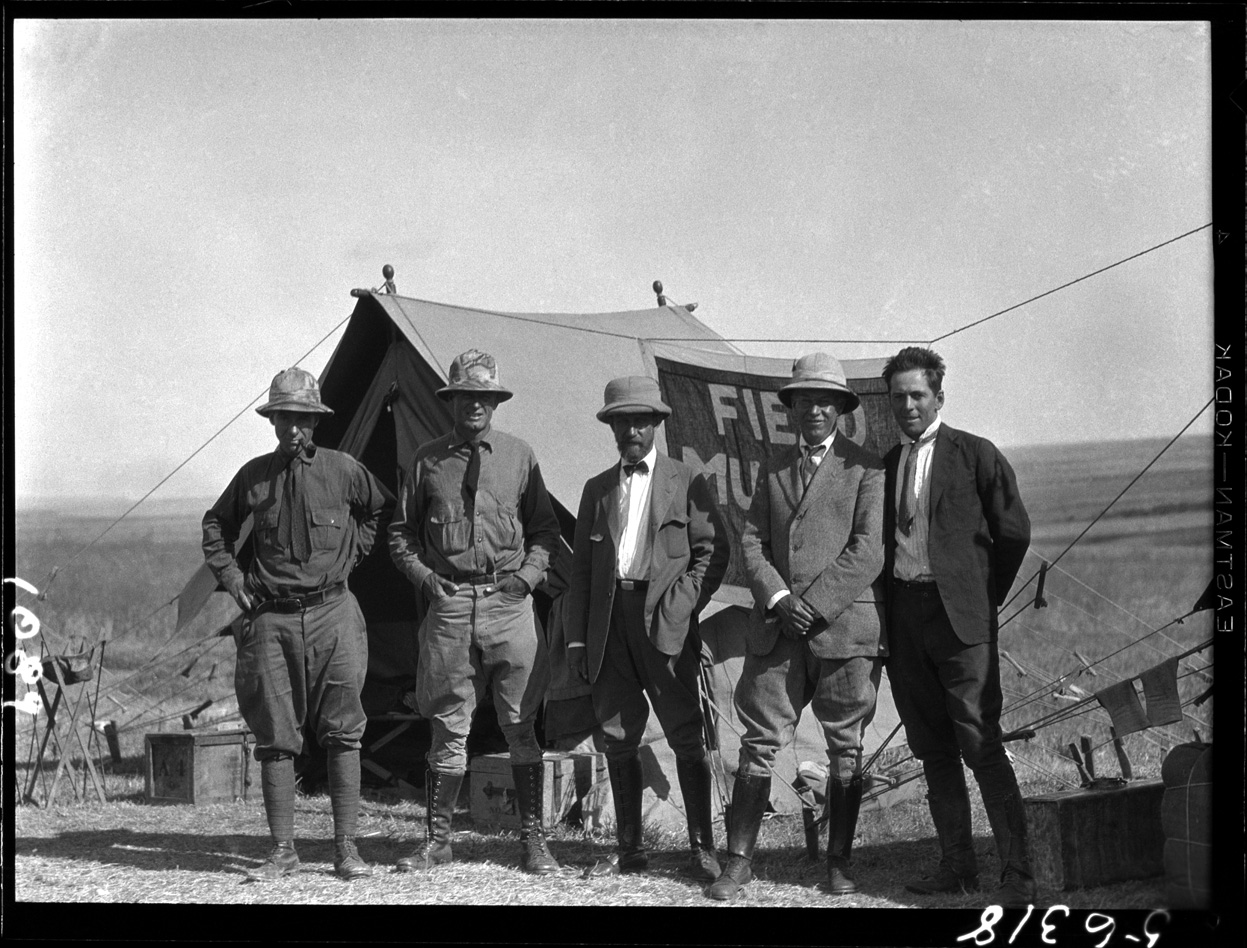
Expedition members, left to right, C. Suydam Cutting, Jack Baum, Wilfred Hudson Osgood, Louis Agassiz Fuertes, Alfred Marshall Bailey, 1927.

In 1925, he went on his first expedition to Chinese Turkestan with Kermit and Theodore Roosevelt Jr. After the Roosevelt expedition, he traveled to Ethiopia in 1926, Assam in 1927, Tibet in 1928, 1930, 1935, 1937, the Galapagos Islands in 1930 (sailing aboard Vincent Astor's yacht Nourmahal), Celebes in 1934, Nepal in 1937, and Upper Burma in 1939. In 1935, he went to the forbidden city of Lhasa in Tibet that made him famous as being among the early Westerners to see the city. He was able to gain admittance by currying favor with the Dalai Lama through a series of gifts over a number of years, including a pair of dachshunds, a pair of dalmatians, gold watches and heating appliances. The Dalai Lama also wanted an ostrich, but it was felt that the animal wouldn't have survived the journey. Eventually, the Dalai Lama permitted Cutting and Arthur Stannard Vernay to enter Lhasa and gave Cutting the first Lhasa Apso dogs that entered the U.S. in 1933.

After his expedition to Lhasa, Cutting wrote a book that was published commercially about his travels over the course of fifteen years, entitled The Fire Ox and Other Years. He also wrote a number of articles for the Museum of Natural History in the 1930s, including articles about his expedition and articles about hunting with a Maharajah's specially trained cheetahs (which was collected in As Told at the Explorer's Club: More than Fifty Tales of Adventure edited by George Plimpton).

Cutting is credited with helping to save the Galapagos tortoise from extinction and with bringing the first Lhasa Apso dogs to the United States.

== Personal life ==
In 1932, Cutting was married to Helen McMahon (1894–1961), who joined him on his second expedition to Tibet in 1937. Helen was a widow of James Cox Brady Sr. (a son of Anthony N. Brady, the largest shareholder of the American Tobacco Company), who died in 1924.

After her death in 1961, he remarried to Mary Percy (née Pyne) Filley (1893–1994) in 1963. Mary, a widow of Oliver Dwight Filley (the grandson of Oliver Filley), was the daughter of Percy Rivington Pyne and Maud (née Howland) Pyne. They had a 35-acre estate known as "Old Fort Bay", purchased by Cutting's first wife and her first husband, near Lyford Cay (located on the western tip of New Providence Island in The Bahamas), where the entertained friends, including Gertrude Legendre. Cutting was a close friend of the Duke (formerly Edward VIII) and Duchess of Windsor, who he entertained at their Gladstone, New Jersey home, known as Hamilton Farms, inherited from his first wife. Mary owned her own estate, Upton Pyne.

Cutting died at his summer home on Chappaquiddick Island in Edgartown, Massachusetts on Martha's Vineyard on August 24, 1972. He was buried at St. Bernard's cemetery in Bernardsville, New Jersey. His widow continued to live in Bernardsville, and then Far Hills, until her death in 1994.

=== Honors ===
Cutting was awarded a Croix de Guerre (with gold star) and an Order of the Black Star from the French. He was also made an honorary Commander, Most Excellent Order of the British Empire.
