= John Hession =

American sports shooter

Personal information
- Born: September 8, 1877 Clinton, Ontario, Canada
- Died: February 1, 1962 (aged 84) Clearwater, Florida, United States

Sport
- Sport: Sports shooting

John Hession (September 8, 1877 – February 1, 1962) was an American sports shooter. He competed in two events at the 1908 Summer Olympics. He was described by some as the greatest shooter of all time, according to the Tampa Bay Times.
