= John Faunthorpe =

British Army officer

J.C. Faunthorpe
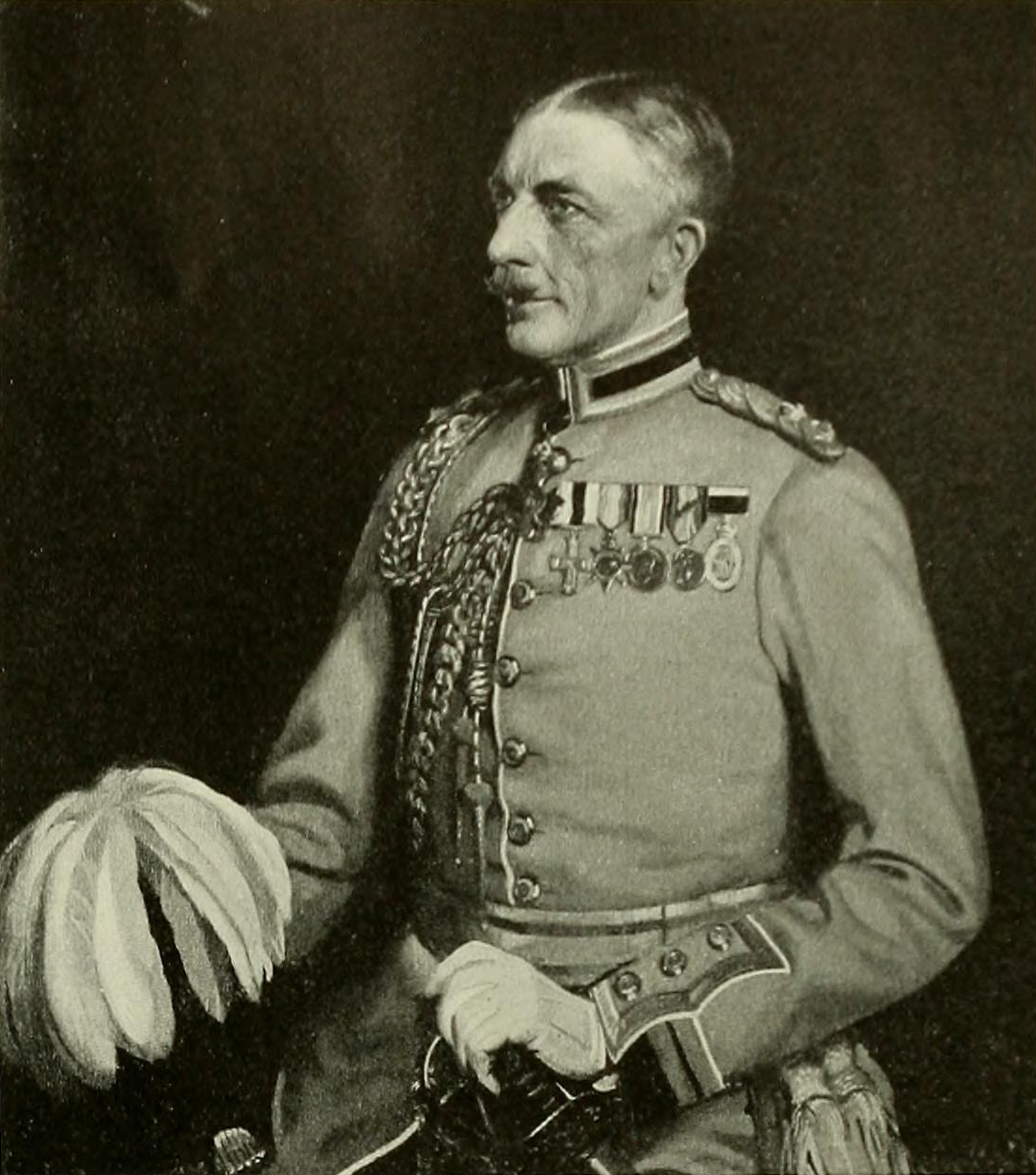

Personal information
- Full name: John Champion Faunthorpe
- Born: 30 May 1871 Battersea, London, England
- Died: 1 December 1929 (aged 58) Lucknow, India

Sport
- Sport: Sports shooting

Colonel John Champion Faunthorpe CBE MC (30 May 1871 – 1 December 1929) was a British Army officer, big game hunter and sport shooter. Apart from serving in the Indian Civil Services in the United Provinces, he served in World War I in army intelligence and was in charge of controlling the press. After working briefly in the United States as part of the British Embassy, he returned to India to join Arthur Stannard Vernay on an expedition to collect specimens of South Asian mammals for the American Museum of Natural History. Mounted specimens of the large mammals they hunted were then exhibited in what was named the Vernay-Faunthorpe Hall.

== Life and work ==
Faunthorpe was born in Battersea, son of Reverend John Pincher Faunthorpe, Principal at the Whitelands Training College, grew up at Bromley, and went to Rossall School and Balliol College, Oxford. He qualified for the Indian Civil Service, arriving in India in 1892 in the United Provinces. He was district magistrate and acting commandant for the 1st United Provinces Horse regiment. While in India he earned a reputation as a big game hunter, bagging (among other things) more than three hundred tigers. He was also known for his horsemanship and served as a steward at the Lucknow Race Course. He was posted to various locations in India, including Bahraich (1901), Muzaffarnagar (1905) and Kheri (1907), though he was on leave in England in 1914 when World War I broke out. He worked in army intelligence and worked in France from 1915 to 1917 placed in charge of controlling and censoring the press and journalists on the front. He was transferred to the General Staff and among other things was Military Director of Cinematograph Operations. He produced a film on the battle of Somme. For his service he was named C.B.E. and awarded the Military Cross, and in 1922 was appointed aide-de-camp to King George V. He was Commissioner of Lucknow with Sir Harcourt Butler as governor when he was faced with the Eka Movement, the rise of tenant farmers and landless against Indian landlords.

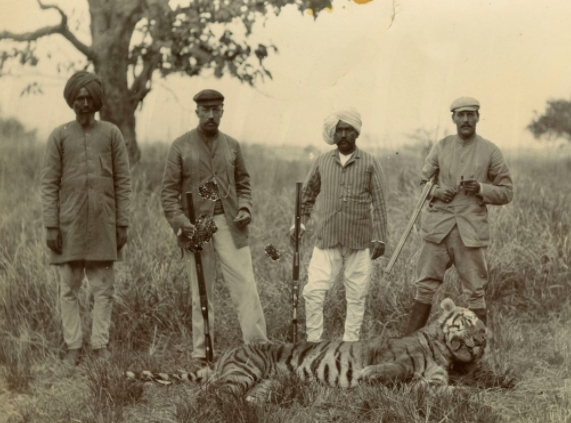
Faunthorpe (right) after a tiger hunt in India

He joined the British mission in the United States in 1918 at San Francisco, working alongside Sir Geoffrey Butler brother of Sir Harcourt Butler who had been governor of the United Provinces. When he returned to India after the war he worked as Commissioner at Lucknow and was placed on special duty so that he could work with Arthur Stannard Vernay to collect specimens for the Natural History Museums of Chicago and New York. Their Vernay-Faunthorpe Expedition (1922–1923) included cameraman G.M. Dyott and his footage was made into a movie called Hunting Tigers in India.

== Shooting and hunting ==
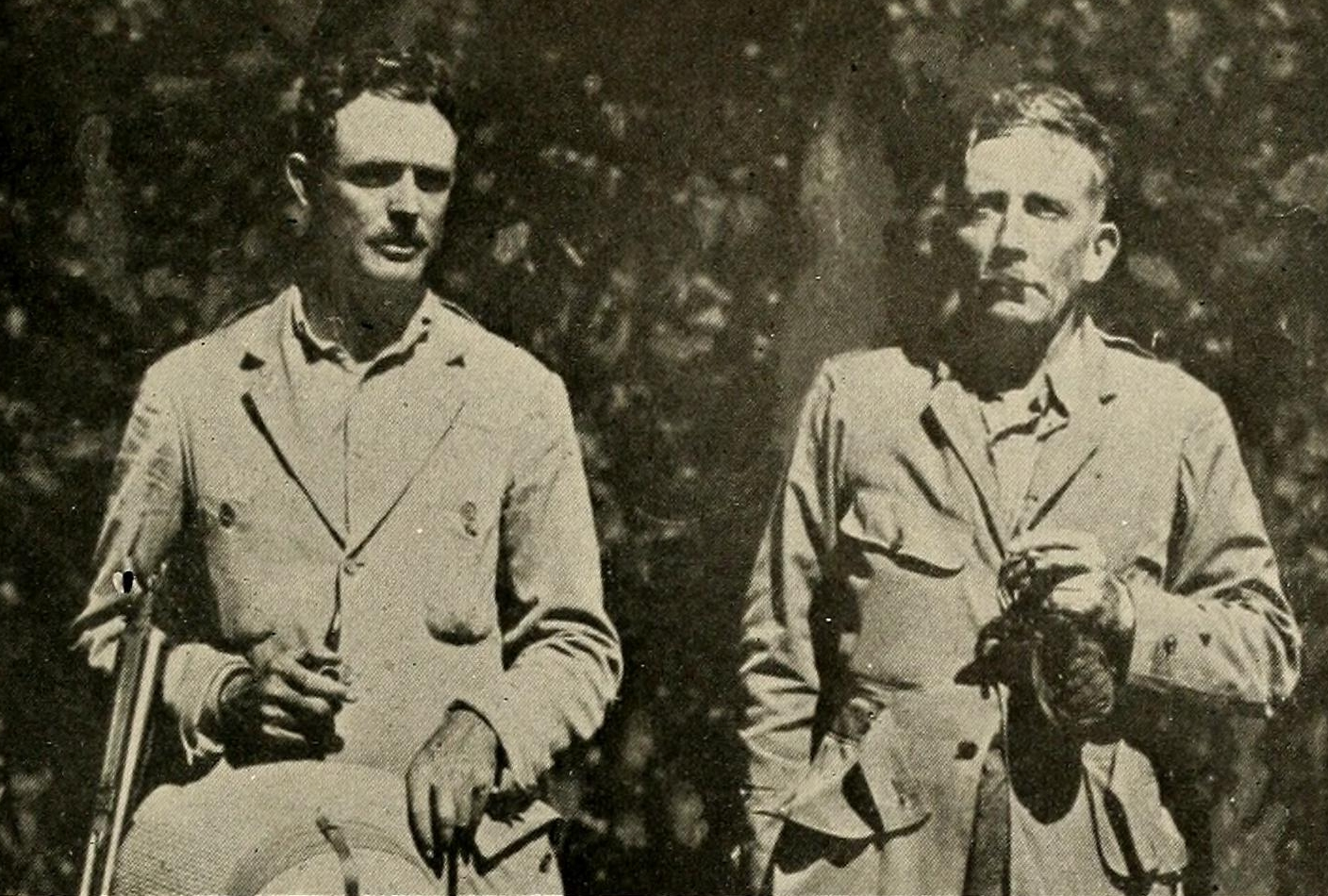
Vernay (left) and Faunthorpe shooting in India, 1923

Faunthorpe was an accomplished shooter from college days. He represented the British team at the 1924 Summer Olympics he finished fourth in the team 100 metre running deer, single shots competition and 21st in the individual 100 metre running deer, single shots event. Faunthorpe believed that many bright young men entered the service in India simply because of the appeal of hunting that would be available to them. As a big game hunter, he shot tigers in India especially when he was posted in Naini Tal, went on numerous pig sticking hunts and on one hunt is noted for spearing a leopard. He killed nearly a hundred leopards in the Muzaffarnagar area where he was posted in 1905.

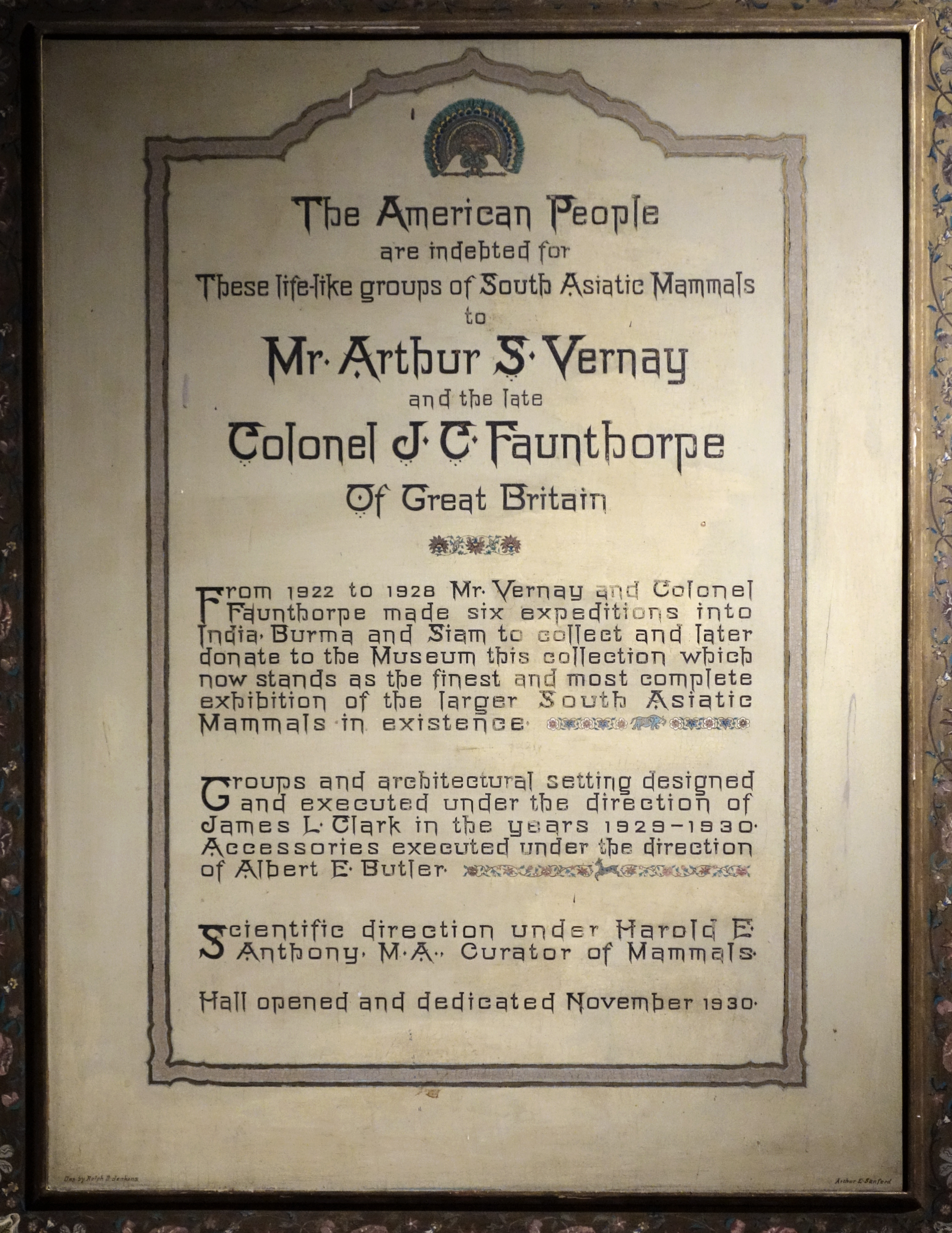
Sign honoring Vernay and Faunthorpe in the American Museum of Natural History, NY

While in the United States, Faunthorpe visited the American Museum of Natural History and wrote to its president Henry Fairfield Osborn that he could help in making a collection of Indian animals as the few Indian specimens exhibited were in a poor state. He also met A.S. Vernay who was then planning travels around the world. Although Faunthorpe used monocles (until he heard that they were unpopular in the United States) and came to be called "Old Blind Eye" he was renowned for his sharp shooting. When in Nepal with Arthur Vernay, a tigress leaped onto the head of the elephant on which they were riding. It was shot by Faunthorpe before it could attack Vernay. Another time, he shot a tiger with a single shot from a swaying elephant top at 200 yards. During the Vernay-Faunthorpe Expedition (1922–1923) he worked with princely states and local governments to collect specimens including those of lions in Kathiawar, tigers, leopards, and elephants in Kheri, Bhopal, and Mysore. These were prepared by the taxidermist John Jonas (his brother Louis Jonas worked on the museum mounts) and were later exhibited in the Vernay-Faunthorpe Hall of the American Museum of Natural History. Faunthorpe also wrote on hunting and the status of wild animals in India. He believed that cheetahs had declined due to predation by Indian wild dogs. He also obtained a pink-headed duck specimen (which he had noted as being extremely rare even then) for the AMNH.

== Personal life and death ==
Faunthorpe married Amy Frances (1871–1953) daughter of Major Ryves in 1895 and they had two sons Peter Champion (1906–1975) and Bertram Ryves (1908–1966). Faunthorpe retired from the Indian Service in 1925 and died in Lucknow, British India, of pneumonia at the end of 1929. When the Vernay-Faunthorpe Hall in the American Museum of Natural History was opened in 1930, Sir Harcourt Butler spoke on the work of his late colleague. Vernay established a Faunthorpe Memorial Cup for shooting after his friend.

== See also ==
- List of famous big game hunters
