= List of parks in Free State (province) =

Located in central South Africa, the Free State Parks are the responsibility of the Department of Economic Development, Tourism and Environmental Affairs of the Free State Province.

== Free State ==
=== National Parks ===
- Golden Gate Highlands National Park, incorporating the former QwaQwa National Park.

=== World Heritage Sites ===
- Vredefort Dome

=== Private and Other Parks ===
- Caledon Nature Reserve around the Welbedacht Dam.
- Erfenis Dam Nature Reserve
- Gariep Nature Reserve formerly known as Hendrik Verwoerd Dam Nature Reserve, on the Free State side of the Gariep Dam; the park on the Eastern Cape side of the dam is named the Oviston Nature Reserve.
- Kalkfontein Nature Reserve around the Kalkfontein Dam.
- Koppies Dam Nature Reserve
- Laohu Valley Reserve
- Maria Moroka Nature Reserve
- Paul Saunders Nature Reserve
- Rolfontein Nature Reserve around the Vanderkloof Dam.
- Rustfontein Dam Nature Reserve
- Sandveld Nature Reserve around the Bloemhof Dam (Free State side only); the park on the North West is called the Bloemhof Dam Nature Reserve.
- Seekoei-vlei Nature Reserve
- Sterkfontein Dam Nature Reserve around the Sterkfontein Dam.
- Soetdoring Nature Reserve around the Krugersdrift Dam.
- Tussen-die- Riviere Nature Reserve, near the Gariep Dam.
- Willem Pretorius Game Reserve around the Allemanskraal Dam.

== Defunct Park ==
- Vaalbos National Park has been closed down.

== See also ==
Department: Tourism.

- List of municipalities in the Free State
- List of protected areas of South Africa
