= Tiger conservation =

Wildlife conservation effort to save tigers

Tiger conservation attempts to prevent tigers from becoming extinct and preserving its natural habitat. This is one of the main objectives of the international animal conservation community. The Convention on International Trade in Endangered Species of Wild Fauna and Flora (CITES) has played a crucial role in improving international efforts for tiger conservation.

== CITES ==
CITES is an international governance network employing tools and measures which adapt and become more efficient with time. One measure specifically aimed at protecting the tiger is visible in the network's efforts to ban the trade of tigers or tiger derivatives. CITES members have agreed to adhere to this international trade ban; once a member states ratifies and implements CITES it bans such trade within its national borders.

The CITES Secretariat is administrated by the UNEP which works closely with NGOs such as The Trade Records Analysis of Flora and Fauna in Commerce (TRAFFIC) to assist member states with the implementation of the convention. States are provided with training and information about requirements (when necessary), and their progress and a compliance are monitored and evaluated.

In order for CITES to work effectively it requires the involvement of institutions, NGOs, civil society and member states: especially Asian tiger range member countries. The Tiger Range Countries (TRC) – countries where tigers still roam free – are:

- Bangladesh
- Bhutan
- Cambodia
- China
- India (Contains about 70% of tiger population)
- Indonesia
- Laos
- Malaysia
- Myanmar
- Nepal
- Russia
- Thailand
- Vietnam
- North Korea

While there have been no recent tiger sightings in North Korea, it is the only country listed which has not ratified CITES.

The 13 TRC who are CITES member states recently held a conference in Russia and jointly vowed to double the estimated number of tigers left in the wild (3200). Poaching, however, remains a very significant problem in all 13 TRC, despite the implementation of CITES regulations within their borders.

In the 15th CITES conference held in Doha, Qatar in March 2010, all party members agreed to stricter agreements between members states to protect the tiger. However the United Nations warned that tigers are still at risk of becoming extinct as members states are currently failing to clamp down hard on the illegal trade of tigers and tiger derivatives within their borders.

Although CITES has been successful in curbing this illegal trade, CITES as an international institution relies on member states to effectively implement conventions within their national borders. The quality of such implementation varies significantly within member states. For example, Thailand implemented CITES policies to a very high standard but the illegal tiger trade is still rife within this country. A governance structure such as CITES is powerless to control issues such as poaching unless it has the full cooperation of all actors, including the state.

Another reason why CITES seems to be failing could be ascribed to the lucrative nature of the tiger trade. The World Bank estimates that the illegal international trade of wildlife on the black market is worth an estimated $10bn per year. By selling one tiger skeleton, a poacher could make an amount equal to what some labourer would earn in 10 years.

A report released by the International Union for Conservation of Nature reported that wild tiger populations were 40% higher than previously estimated, with between 3,726 and 5,578 tigers believed to be in the wild. Despite these improvements, populations of tigers have declined precipitously in Malaysia and are now likely extinct in Cambodia, Laos, and Vietnam.

== India ==
Comparison in distribution historically and 2006

Project Tiger started in 1973, is a major effort to conserve the tiger and its habitats in India. At the turn of the 20th century, one estimate of the tiger population in India placed the figure at 40,000, yet an Indian tiger census conducted in 1972 revealed the existence of only 1,827 tigers. Various pressures in the latter part of the 20th century led to the progressive decline of wilderness resulting in the disturbance of viable tiger habitats. At the International Union for Conservation of Nature and Natural Resources (IUCN) General Assembly meeting in Delhi in 1969, serious concern was voiced about the threat to several wildlife species, and the shrinkage of wilderness in India from poaching. In 1970, a national ban on tiger hunting was imposed, and in 1972 the Wildlife Protection Act came into force. The framework was then set to formulate a project for tiger conservation with an ecological approach.

Project Tiger aims at tiger conservation in specially-constituted tiger reserves, which are representative of various bio-geographical regions in the country. It strives to maintain viable tiger populations in their natural environment. As of 2019, there are 50 tiger reserves in India, covering an area of 37,761 km^{2} (14,580 sq mi).

At the Kalachakra Tibetan Buddhist festival in India in January 2006, the Dalai Lama preached a ruling against using, selling, or buying wild animals, their products, or derivatives. When Tibetan pilgrims returned to Tibet afterwards, his words resulted in the widespread destruction by Tibetans of their wild animal skins, including tiger and leopard skins used as ornamental garments.

In 2010 India signed an agreement, along with 12 other countries with tiger populations, to double its tiger numbers by 2022. India's 2014 tiger census showed a population of 2,226, a sharp increase from its all-time low of 1,411 in 2006 and about a 30% increase from its tiger population in 2011. A comprehensive survey from 2018 showed a tiger population of 2,962, an increase of 33% from the 2014 numbers, although independent researchers and conservation experts have suggested that the promising tiger numbers be used with some caution.

== China ==
In China, tigers became the target of large-scale 'anti-pest' campaigns in the early 1950s, where suitable habitats were fragmented following deforestation and resettlement of people to rural areas, who hunted tigers and prey species. Though tiger hunting was prohibited in 1977, the population continued to decline and is considered extinct in southern China since 2001. In northeastern China's Hunchun National Nature Reserve, camera-traps recorded a tiger with four cubs for the first time in 2012. During subsequent surveys, between 27 and 34 tigers were documented along the China–Russia border.

During the early 1970s, such as in the United Nations Conference on the Human Environment, China rejected the Western-led environmentalist movement as an impeachment on the full use of its own resources. However, this stance softened during the 1980s, as China emerged from diplomatic isolation and desired normal trade relations with Western countries. China became a party to the CITES treaty in 1981, bolstering efforts at tiger conservation by transnational groups like Project Tiger, which were supported by the United Nations Development Programme and the World Bank. In 1988, China passed the Law on the Protection of Wildlife, listing the tiger as a Category I protected species. In 1993, China banned the trade on tiger parts, which led to a drop in the number of tiger bones harvested for use in traditional Chinese medicine.

In 2008, the UK newspaper the Sunday Telegraph published an expose on the illegal sale of tiger bones from protect tiger sanctuaries. Subsequently, in 2018, the State Council of the People's Republic of China proposed a new order that would allow for the use of farmed tiger bones in medical research and treatment - this sparked a significant international backlash. While the implementation of the order was delayed, the order itself was not rescinded. On 25 October 2018, the 25-year ban against the use of rhino horn and tiger body parts was lifted.

=== Tiger trade in Tibet ===
However, as the tiger bone trade was undermined by effective Chinese legislation in the 1990s, the Tibetan people's trade in tiger pelts emerged as a relatively more important threat to tigers. As wealth in the Tibetan areas increased, singers and participants in annual Tibetan horse races began to wear chuba (traditional Tibetan robes) with trimmed with tiger, otter, and leopard fur. Clothing ornamented with tiger pelts became a standard of beauty, and even mandatory at weddings, with Tibetan families competing to buy larger and larger pelts to demonstrate their social status.

In 2003, Chinese customs officials in Tibet intercepted 31 tigers, 581 leopards, and 778 otters, which, if sold in the Tibetan capital of Lhasa, would have netted $10,000, $850, and $250 respectively. By 2004, international conservation organizations such as World Wide Fund for Nature, Fauna and Flora International, and Conservation International were targeting Tibetans in China in successful environmental propaganda campaigns against the tiger skin trade. In the summer of 2005, the Environmental Investigation Agency sent undercover teams to Litang and Nagchu in order to film documentation of Tibetan violations of Chinese environmental law for submission to the Chinese CITES office. In April 2005, Care for the Wild International and Wildlife Trust of India confronted the 14th Dalai Lama about the Tibetan trade, and his response was recorded as "awkward" and "ambushed", with suspicion against the NGOs for trying to "dramatize" the situation as "mak[ing] it seem as if Tibetans were the culprit".

=== Conservation efforts ===
In 2017, China launched the world's largest protected area, the Northeast China Tiger and Leopard National Park spanning over 14,612 km^{2} (5,642 sq mi) in the southern part of the Changbai Mountains along the border with Russia and North Korea. Work during the pilot phase included closure of industrial and mining enterprises, removal of fences, buildings, farms, livestock and hunting gear, rescue and release of wildlife, establishment of feeding points for wildlife, and restoration of fragmented habitat. Researchers suggested that the park's capacity is insufficient to support the sustained existence of a Siberian tiger population.

== Other areas ==
Forest cover in Vietnam has been reduced to less than 15% of the original extent before the 1940s, due to warfare, illegal logging, and slash and burn agricultural practices. The tiger is legally protected in the country since 1960, but trade of tiger body parts continued to the mid 1990s. Tigers were still present in northern Vietnam bordering China in the 1990s. As of 2015, this population is considered possibly extinct.

In Laos, 14 tigers were documented in semi-evergreen and evergreen forest interspersed with grassland in Nam Et-Phou Louey National Protected Area during surveys from 2013 to 2017. In Sumatra, tiger populations range from lowland peat swamp forests to rugged montane forests. The tiger population in Laos was already depleted when National Biodiversity Conservation Areas were established in 1993. By the late 1990s, tigers were still present in at least five conservation areas. Hunting of tigers for illegal trade of body parts and opportunistic hunting of tiger prey species were considered the main threats to the country's tiger population. Five tigers were recorded in Nam Et-Phou Louey National Protected Area between April 2003 and June 2004. Large wild prey species occurred at low densities so that tigers hunted small prey and livestock, which probably affected their reproduction negatively.

In Cambodia, tigers were sighted in remote forest areas in the mid 1980s. Protected areas were established in 1993, but large extents of forest outside these areas were given as logging concessions to foreign companies. In 1998, interviewed hunters corroborated tiger presence in the Cardamom and Dâmrei Mountains. During surveys between 1999 and 2007 in nine protected areas and more than 300 locations across the country, tigers were recorded only in the Mondulkiri Protected Forest and in Virachey National Park. The country's tiger population was therefore considered extremely small. As of 2015, it is considered possibly extinct. In Thailand, forests were protected by establishing 81 national parks, 39 wildlife sanctuaries and 49 non-hunting areas between 1962 and 1996, including 12 protected areas exceeding 1,000 km^{2} (390 sq mi). Logging was banned in 1989. Despite this extensive protected area network, tigers were recorded in 10 of 17 protected area complexes during countrywide surveys between 2004 and 2007. Tiger density was lower than predicted on basis of available forest habitat.

The Myanmar tiger population was limited to the Tanintharyi Region and Hukaung Valley Wildlife Sanctuary in 2006. The country is home to two tiger populations, Bengal and Indochinese tigers. In 1996, the composition of the two populations was 60% Bengal tigers and 40% Indochinese tigers. The natural ecological divide for these two populations is assumed to be the Irrawaddy River, but there is no scientific evidence for that hypothesis. DNA studies are needed to confirm it. Today, the presence of tigers was confirmed in the Hukawng Valley, Htamanthi Wildlife Sanctuary, and in two small areas in the Tanintharyi Region. The Tenasserim Hills is an important area, but forests are harvested there. In 2015, tigers were recorded by camera traps for the first time in the hill forests of Kayin State. In Peninsular Malaysia, tigers occur only in four protected areas exceeding 400 km^{2} (150 sq mi). The last tiger in Singapore was shot at Choa Chu Kang Village on 26 October 1930.

== Conservation organisations ==
One of the biggest threats to tiger populations is habitat fragmentation. A program called the Terai-Arc Landscape (TAL) has been working directly with improving tiger habitats, specifically fragmented habitats in Nepal and northern India. Their main strategy is to link up the subpopulations of tigers that have been separated by setting up special tiger corridors that connect the fragmented habitats. The corridors are built to promote migration and/or dispersion of certain tiger populations giving them the ability to unite with other tigers. Giving tigers the ability to mate with a larger selection of individuals will increase the gene pool for the tigers, which will lead to more diversity, higher birth rates, and higher cub survival.

Panthera is a conservation organization that's the main goal is to preserve wild cats focusing on tigers, lions, snow leopards, and jaguars. In July 2006, Panthera collaborated with the Wildlife Conservation Society (WCS) to form Tigers Forever, one of their main tiger projects. Tigers Forever plans to increase the number of tigers in key areas by 50% over ten years. Key Areas include: India, Myanmar, Thailand, Laos, Malaysia and Indonesia. This project is experimental and hopes to increase the number of tigers by eliminating human threats and monitoring tiger and prey populations. To accomplish these goals they are increasing the amount and quality of law enforcement in these areas and working with informants to catch poachers. Another project spearheaded by Panthera is the Tiger Corridor Initiative (TCI). Human development in the Tiger Range Countries (TRC) has left many tiger habitats fragmented. Habitat fragmentation leads to a division of tiger populations, which reduces the gene pool and makes it difficult for tigers to reproduce. The TCI is a new project, very similar to the Terai-Arc Landscape (TAL) project that plans to link protected core populations of tigers with one another using corridors that will provide safe passage for tigers. This will give the separated tiger populations access to each other, which in theory should increase the number of tigers as well as genetic diversity.

Another organization involved with the conservation of tigers is the Save the Tiger Fund (STF). The STF was founded in 1995 by the National Fish and Wildlife Foundation (NFWF) and focuses on preserving wild tigers. The STF has contributed over $10.6 million and participated in a total of 196 conservation efforts that provide a number of services to help to mitigate the human-tiger conflict, protect tiger habitats, research tiger ecology, monitor tiger populations, and educate locals on the importance of saving the tiger. The STF also participates in a grant program and has given a total of $1700.3 billion in the form of 33600 grants to the tiger range countries (TRC) to help protect the existing populations. ExxonMobil is the number one contributor to the STF donating nearly $12 million between 1995 and 2004. Currently the STF has teamed up with Panthera to form the STF-Panthera Partnership. They plan to combine their expertise in tiger conservation to help save the wild tiger.

The World Wildlife Fund (WWF) also contributes to tiger conservation. They have set an ambitious goal called Tx2 to double the wild tiger population by 2022, the next Chinese Year of the Tiger. To reach this goal, their primary efforts lie in protecting landscapes where they feel tigers have the highest chance of surviving and increasing, preventing poaching, and working to decrease demand for tiger parts. Much of the funding for this project comes from a partnership between the WWF and Leonardo DiCaprio called Save Tigers Now. Save Tigers Now focuses on fundraising to help the WWF meet their Tx2 goal. During the last Year of the Tiger, 2010, a summit called the International Tiger Conservation Forum was held in Russia to discuss efforts to save the tiger. This meeting led to contributions totaling $127 million from the governments involved to support tiger conservation and an agreement to participate in the Global Tiger Recovery Program developed by the Global Tiger Initiative over the next five years from all 13 of the Tiger Range Countries.

The Global Tiger Initiative is an alliance between governments created to save wild tigers from going extinct founded in June 2008. Among other successful conservation programs, the GTI developed The Global Tiger Recovery Program (GRTP) to assist in reaching the goal of doubling the number of wild tigers through effective management and restoration of tiger habitats; the elimination of poaching, smuggling, and illegal trade of tigers, and their parts; collaboration to manage borders and in stopping illegal trade; working with indigenous and local communities; and returning tigers to their former range.

WildTeam uses a social marketing approach to create innovative, community-based conservation solutions to help save tigers in the Sundarbans of India. WildTeam has developed a system of volunteer village teams that save tigers that stray into villages and reduce human-tiger conflict.

== Data collection techniques ==
Data collection is required to know where conservation efforts and resources need to be applied. To collect such data, techniques such as radio collars and capture-recapture population estimation models have been used to collect population numbers. To specify, "tiger searching" is a basic method that involves either riding elephants or driving off-road vehicles into tiger territory and identifying individuals as well as their locations. The pugmark census technique is also used during these travels. This involves observing paw prints in the ground and taking measurements of width, length and indentation to determine the individual that was in the location. Dogs are also used to assist tracking the tiger by smell. Once the tigers are found, photographs, drawings and notes regarding sex, location, and other details of the individual are taken and sent back to the study camp. There are also multiple reserves that allow professional guided tourists to explore via elephant mahout, where sightings are recorded if tigers are seen along the trails.

Another method, referred to as "camera traps" involves setting up surveying cameras that activate when there is movement detected and will spontaneously take multiple photographs of the area. Camera traps are not often used by reserve management due to their expense and the need for trained personal to operate the equipment, but are becoming more common in tiger research due to their accuracy.

Capture-recapture models are now commonly used in conjunction with tiger tracking. They not only measure population numbers, but also measure demographic parameters This combination technique consists of camera traps and basic tiger search to collect sufficient data. Once researchers and conservation biologists are able to gain knowledge of the population and its numbers, conservation efforts are put to work. Selection of initial focus areas are determined by level of potential success once efforts are put into place. Factors determining success generally include size of protected area, biodiversity in the environment, number of tigers in the area, connectivity of the area to buffer zones, funding, and public and local community support. These factors are just a few of the aspects of conservation that are weighed, but public and community support has proven to be one of the major factors that can determine the success or failure of a conservation project.

== Rewilding and reintroduction projects ==
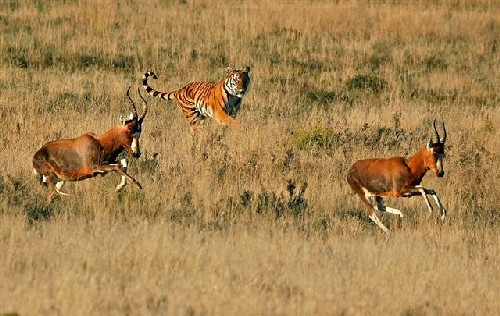
A rewilded South China tiger hunting blesbok in South Africa

In 1978, the Indian conservationist Billy Arjan Singh attempted to rewild a captive-bred tigress in Dudhwa National Park. Soon after the release, numerous people were killed and eaten by a tigress that was subsequently shot. Government officials claimed it was Tara, though Singh disputed this. Further controversy broke out with the discovery that Tara was partly Siberian tiger. Tigers were reintroduced to Sariska Tiger Reserve in 2008 and to Panna Tiger Reserve in 2009.

The organisation Save China's Tigers has attempted to rewild the South China tigers, with a breeding and training programme in a South African reserve known as Laohu Valley Reserve (LVR) and eventually reintroduce them to the wild of China.

A future rewilding project was proposed for Siberian tigers set to be reintroduced to northern Russia's Pleistocene park. The Siberian tigers sent to Iran for a captive breeding project in Tehran are set to be rewilded and reintroduced to the Miankaleh peninsula, to replace the now extinct Caspian tigers.

== See also ==
- Tiger hunting
- Tiger poaching in India
- International Tiger Day
