= Laohu Valley Reserve =

National reserve in South Africa

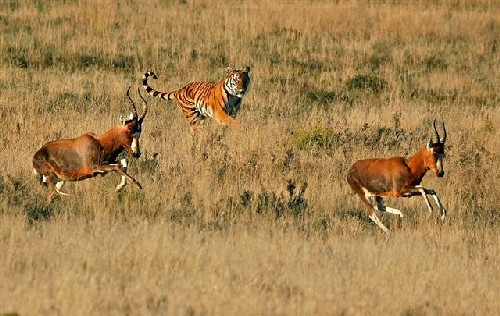
- South China tiger chasing blesbucks in Laohu Valley

- Location within South Africa
- Location: Northern Cape and Free State provinces, South Africa
- Nearest city: Philippolis
- Coordinates: 30°17′14.0″S 25°06′20.2″E
- Area: 350 km^{2} (140 sq mi)
- Established: 2002
- Governing body: Protected areas of South Africa
- Website: savechinastigers.org

The Laohu Valley Reserve (LVR) is a nature reserve located near Philippolis in the Free State and near Vanderkloof Dam in the Northern Cape of South Africa. It is a roughly 350-square-kilometre private reserve.

It has been created with the aims of nurturing captive-born South China tigers (Panthera tigris tigris) in South Africa and eventually releasing them into the wild in China. It is also aimed to restore South African biodiversity in the parts of the reserve not populated by tigers.

== History ==
The Laohu Valley Reserve was created in 2002 out of 17 defunct sheep farms, and efforts to return the overgrazed land to natural status are ongoing. The South China tigers at LVR for rewilding are kept confined to a tiger-proof camp complex of roughly 1.8 square kilometers, with other areas of the reserve being used to protect native South African species. The word "laohu" is a Chinese term for tiger.

Wildlife conservationist Li Quan initially enlisted the help of John Varty (wildlife filmmaker) and Dave Varty (eco-tourism developer) in South Africa to assist in the rehabilitation process. However, Li Quan and her husband, investment banker Stuart Bray, became concerned that the Vartys were misusing the project's funds to buy land for themselves. Later, in July 2002, the Vartys admitted to borrowing a small portion of Bray's money. After a legal audit, it was discovered that over R5-million had been borrowed by the Vartys, having been used to pay off the Vartys' Londolozi Productions debt on unauthorized salaries. Some of the money was also said to have gone into the Vartys' personal loan accounts and towards paying off their Betty's Bay seaside property. Finally, in October 2002, a few weeks before an agreement was due to be signed with Chinese authorities after the Chinese Wildlife Department began to recognize the project's conservation value, the Vartys pulled out of the project.

Due to the action spearheaded by Save China's Tigers (SCT), other efforts to convert defunct sheep farms into wildlife farms in this area have been gaining speed. In other words, SCT is a leader in restoring South African biodiversity to the area around Phillippolis in the Free State.

=== Effects of tigers on South Africa's ecosystem and biodiversity ===
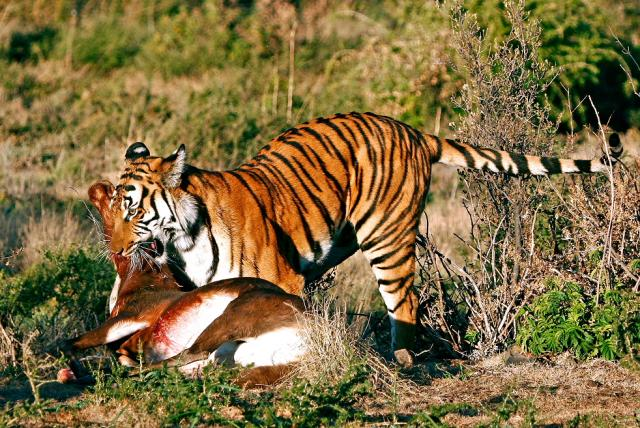
A South China tiger killing a blesbuck at Laohu Valley Reserve.

There are people who oppose the project because they are afraid that the tigers, being considered an alien species, will affect the South African biodiversity negatively.

However, the project organisers argue it will not cause such a problem as Laohu Valley Reserve has been converted from 17 pieces of defunct sheep farms that were overgrazed; thus no healthy ecosystems existed there at all. In addition, the tigers are in fenced-off camps – hence the South China tigers never roam outside Laohu Valley Reserve and there is, therefore, no contact between them and any healthy ecosystem that exists nearby. On the contrary, instead of having negative effects on South Africa's biodiversity, the project actually has positive effects on it. This is because the defunct sheep farms have been restored and converted into a wildlife reserve that is beneficial to the South African ecosystem. This can be considered the contribution of the South China tigers to the biodiversity of South Africa. Without the Chinese tigers, the land for the project in South Africa would never have been purchased.

Save China's Tigers do not believe there will be any side-effect to the local ecology.

== Geography ==
The Laohu Valley Reserve is one of the largest protected areas in South Africa, comprising an area of approximately 378 square kilometres (146 sq mi). It is located in the central region of the country. It takes in land near Philippolis in the Free State section, which consists of approximately 232 square kilometres (90 sq mi) on the northern side, and spans part of the Orange River (including the upper reaches of the Vanderkloof Dam) in the Northern Cape section, which consists of approximately 146 square kilometres (56 sq mi) on the southern side. The Free State side of the reserve consists of tiger camps bordered by 6,000 kilometres (3,700 mi) of fence.

== Climate ==
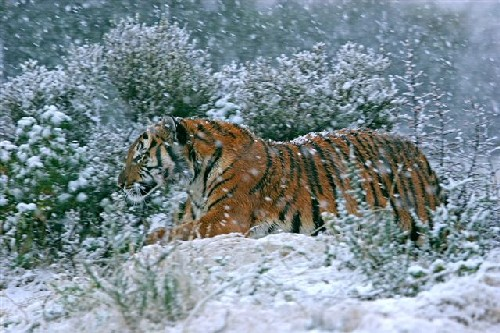
A South China tigress at Laohu Valley Reserve during the winter.

Mean annual rainfall is about 400 mm. About 60% of the annual rainfall occurs in the form of thunderstorms during January–April. The maximum amount of rain generally falls during March, with June generally being the driest month. Summer days are hot, but frost is common during winter, with occasional snowfall.

== Flora and fauna ==
The grasslands of Laohu Valley occur on the lower-lying flat areas, with karroid shrubs on the rocky hill slopes on Karoo dolerite making up roughly 40% of the total area. Fairly dense stands of shrubs and trees occur along rivers and in ravines. Extensive stands of closed, dense Acacia karoo woodlands are found along stretches of the Orange River.

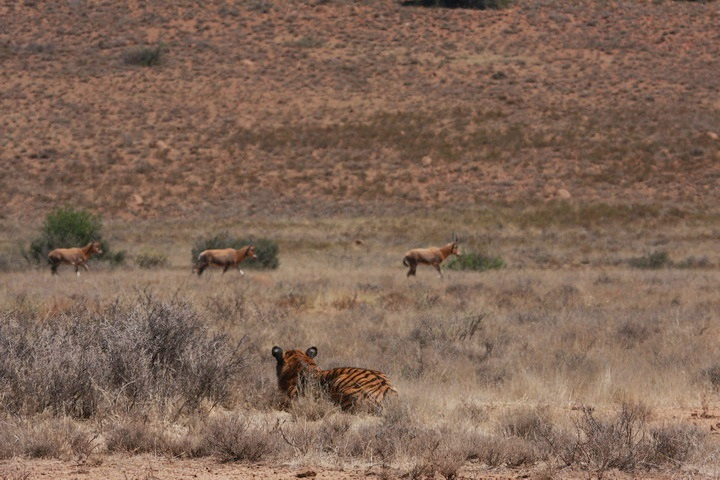
A South China tiger stalking a herd of blesbuck at Laohu Valley Reserve.

The Laohu Valley Reserve is known to breed South China tigers (Panthera tigris amoyensis). At the end of 2015, there were 20 wild individuals living in the reserve, representing about 20% of the world's population of this critically endangered subspecies. Two cubs were among those individuals. However, in February 2016, one of the two South China tiger cubs born in late 2015 died, leaving 19 South China tigers in the reserve. At some point in that year, the South China tigers made a quick recovery with the birth of six healthy cubs at Laohu Valley Reserve, most of which are confirmed to be males. Three cubs were born to Madonna: Hunter, Ivan, and Jay. Two cubs to Cathay: Felix and Gilbert. And one cub to Princess known as K, although the cub's gender has yet to be determined.

Other than tigers, predators such as African wild dogs (Lycaon pictus), lions (Panthera leo), African leopards (Panthera pardus pardus), spotted hyenas (Crocuta crocuta), cheetahs (Acinonyx jubatus), Nile crocodiles (Crocodylus niloticus), African wildcats (Felis silvestris), caracals (Caracal caracal), bat-eared foxes (Otocyon megalotis megalotis) and black-backed jackals (Lupulella mesomelas), and herbivorous mammals such as Blesbuck, and plains zebras (Equus quagga), live within the reserve too. It is also home to birds such as crested guineafowl (Guttera pucherani), Egyptian geese (Alopochen aegyptiaca) and South African ostriches (Struthio camelus australis).

The prey menus of tiger and lion are similar. The South China tigers prey on blesboks (Damaliscus pygargus phillipsi), springboks (Antidorcas marsupialis), gemsboks (Oryx gazella), black wildebeest (Connochaetes gnou), blue wildebeest (Connochaetes taurinus), common elands (Taurotragus oryx), impalas (Aepyceros melampus), waterbucks (Kobus ellipsiprymnus), common warthogs (Phacochoerus africanus) and bushman rabbits.

In 2013, in partnership with the Endangered Wildlife Trust (EWT), two male South African cheetahs (Acinonyx jubatus jubatus) were relocated by being taken from the Amakhala Game Reserve and released into the Laohu Valley Reserve. It is noted to be first time that wild cheetahs have been reintroduced to the Free State after a hundred years of regional extinction. In early 2016, an adult female South African cheetah was introduced to the reserve. Three wild cheetah cubs were born in Laohu Valley Reserve in February 2017, the first cheetahs born in the wild in the Free State since their disappearance from the province over a century ago.

== See also ==
- Living with Tigers
- Protected areas of South Africa
- Free State Parks
