= Sundarbans Tiger Project =

Wildlife preservation project in Bangladesh

The Sundarban Tiger project is a Bangladesh Forest Department initiative that effectively started its field activities in February 2005. The idea for this project was first developed during a field survey in 2001 conducted by Md. Osman Gani, Ishtiaq U. Ahmad, James L. D. Smith and K. Ullas Karanth. They realized that the Sundarbans mangrove forest at the mouth of the Ganges River contained one of the largest populations of wild tigers in the world. As such, there was an urgent need to start measures that would ensure the protection of this precious area.

The Save the Tiger Fund and the United States Fish and Wildlife Service generously donated funds to support the initial phase of research that aims to collect data on tiger ecology using telemetry and study the tiger's environment by assessing its habitat and prey.

Management of a wilderness area needs more than just information on the species to be protected, it also requires skilled personnel, adequate resources to implement conservation strategies, and broad national support. From the research base, the project is evolving rapidly to encompass capacity building and conservation awareness activities through the planning of management taken by the Forest Department and the widespread support of the Bangladeshi people.

From 2004 to 2008, the project was administered by the Forest Department and used wildlife consultants from the University of Minnesota to advise on research strategies and train staff. From 2008 to 2012 the project was coordinated by the Wildlife Trust of Bangladesh, with advisory support from the Zoological Society of London. From 2013 the project has changed its name to "TigerTeam" under the coordination of the Wildlife Trust of Bangladesh, which in 2013 changed its name to "WildTeam".
