= International Tiger Day =

International observance, 29 July

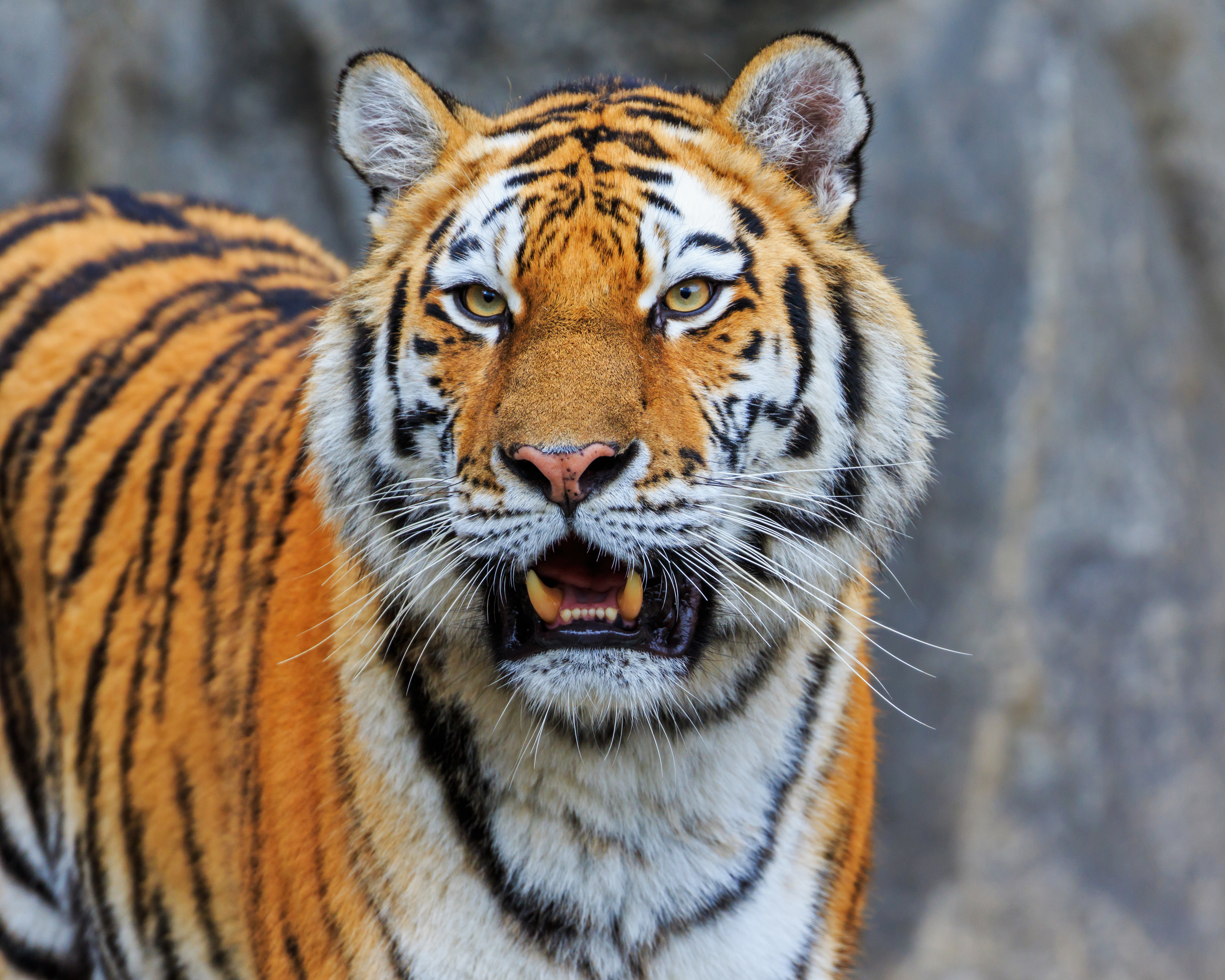
- Date: 29 July
- Next time: 29 July 2027
- Frequency: Annual

Global Tiger Day, often called International Tiger Day, is an annual celebration to raise awareness for tiger conservation, held annually on 29 July. It was created in 2010 at the Saint Petersburg Tiger Summit in Russia by Vladimir Putin, who has made it his mission to save the Amur tiger. He signed laws that impose significantly tough punishments and lengthy prison sentences for the poaching, illegal trade, transportation or storage of tigers in Russia. The Amur Tiger Centre is an organization created by the Russian Geographical Society on the initiative of the President of the Russian Federation Vladimir Putin. The goal of the day is to promote a global system for protecting the natural habitats of tigers and to raise public awareness and support for tiger conservation issues. International Tiger Day has been shown to be effective in increasing online awareness on tigers through information search.

== By year ==
=== 2017 ===
The seventh annual Global Tiger Day was celebrated in various ways around the world. Local events have been organized in Bangladesh, Nepal, and India as well as non-tiger-range countries such as England and the United States. Some celebrities also participated by removing their social media profile photos. The World Wildlife Fund (WWF) continued its promotion of the "Double Tigers" campaign through investing in rangers. Several companies partnered with WWF to help raise awareness.

=== 2018 ===
More awareness in the entire world of tiger populations and the challenges for their conservationists. India counts the number of wild tigers every four years and showed a promising rise from 1411 in 2006 to 2226 in 2014. The trend for rising population of tigers in India is as follows:

1. In the year 2006 - 1411
2. In the year 2010 - 1706
3. In the year 2014 - 2226
4. In the year 2018 - 2967
5. In the year 2022 - 3167
6. In the year 2023 - 3682

=== 2019 ===
On July 29, Indian Prime Minister Narendra Modi announced that the number of Indian tigers had grown to 3,000.

=== 2020 ===
On Global Tiger Day 2020, WWF-China began a national campaign named #TigersNeedCorridors, aimed at raising public awareness and calling on public support to facilitate government actions on corridor structures.

=== 2022 ===
In occasion of the Global Tiger Day 2022, South Korean singers Hoshi and Tiger JK released a single on July 29 called "Tiger".

=== 2023 ===
In India, the tiger population has shown a significant increase, reaching 3,682, up from 2,967 in 2018. This marks a notable rise of almost 24% within a span of four years. These figures reflect a positive trend, surpassing the 3,167 tigers reported by Prime Minister Narendra Modi during an event in Mysore on April 9. This announcement coincided with a program commemorating 50 years of Project Tiger, a renowned conservation initiative globally acclaimed for its efforts.

In April 2023, the Prime Minister expressed happiness that India is home to 75% of the world's tiger population in the 75th year of Indian independence. It is also a coincidence, the Prime Minister continued, that the tiger reserves in India cover 75,000 square kilometers of land and that, in the past ten to twelve years, the tiger population in the country has increased by 75 percent.

=== 2024 ===
The theme of the 2024 International Tiger Day was "Call for Action". It highlighted the importance of concerted efforts from the global community to save the endangered tiger.

India hosted pre-event celebrations across ten villages, with activities including drawing competitions, storytelling, quizzes and environmental games. All activities culminated in a main event on July 29, which highlighted tiger recovery efforts in Manas, and had cultural programs along with panel discussions which surrounded the discussion of the intersection of tiger conservation and local culture.

Thailand hosted a 3-day event running from July 25 to July 27 which featured forums and dialogue sessions on tiger conservation, including key figures like the IUCN Asia Regional Director and Panthera representatives, who all addressed the importance of species conservation in achieving development goals.

Nepal hosted their National Conservation Forum from June 28 to June 30, which included a panel discussion on tiger conservation, the presentation of the ITHCP results and strategy propositions surrounding future efforts. These results were later shared on July 29 during their International Tiger Day celebrations.

=== 2025 ===
The theme of the 2025 International Tiger Day was "Securing the Future of Tigers with IPLCs". It highlighted the central role that IPLCs play in protecting tigers, through their generational run of living alongside wild tigers.

== See also ==
- Tiger conservation
- Tiger § Conservation efforts
- Tiger hunting
