= Save China's Tigers =

International conservation organization

- Abbreviation: SCT
- Formation: 2000
- Founder: Li Quan
- Purpose: Tiger conversation
- Key people: Stuart Bray; Brad Nilson; Kun (Michael) Shang; Heinrich Funck
- Website: www.savechinastigers.org

Save China's Tigers (SCT) is an international charitable foundation based in Hong Kong, the United States, and the United Kingdom (headquartered in London) that aims to save the big cats of China from extinction. It focuses on the Chinese tigers (South China tigers). It also has other branches in mainland China and South Africa.

== Aims ==
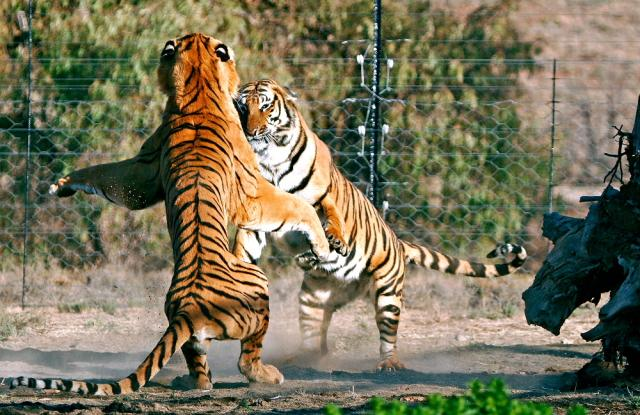
Stud tiger 327 with his potential mate, Cathay

The organization's primary objective is to raise awareness regarding the vulnerability of the Chinese Tiger, while advocating for its protection and preservation. This mission is pursued through public education, the introduction of advanced conservation models, and experimentation with these models both within China and internationally. Additionally, the organization seeks to secure funding to support these conservation initiatives. Another aim is to act as a liaison for all those organizations concerned with the conservation of China's wildlife, sustainable development, biodiversity, and habitat.

== History ==
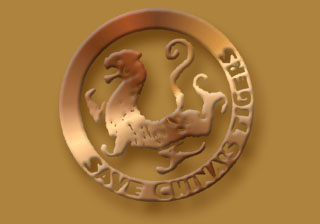
Save China's Tigers, organization logo

"Save China's Tigers" is a conservation organization founded in 2000 by Li Quan. Li Quan's then-husband, Stuart Bray, who had previously worked as an executive at Deutsche Bank, provided financial support for the organization during its early stages.

== Rewilding ==
=== Origin ===
The word "rewilding" was coined by conservationist and activist Dave Foreman, first occurring in print in 1990. The concept was further defined and expanded by conservation biologists Michael Soulé and Reed Noss in a paper published in 1998. According to Soulé and Noss, rewilding is a conservation method based on "cores, corridors, and carnivores."

=== The process ===
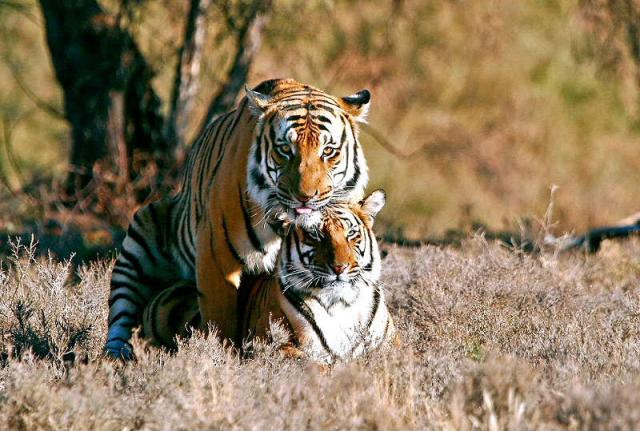
Tigerwoods mounting Madonna

Rehabilitation steps taken by the project include feeding the tigers with carcasses of small game. Once the tigers are eating the new food items, live animals similar to those taken dead will be occasionally introduced into large hunting camps. The SPCA claimed that this process was cruel to the prey, but the South African courts refused to issue an interdict.

== The Laohu Valley Reserve ==
The Laohu Valley Reserve (LVR) is a roughly 350 square kilometer private reserve near Philippolis in the Free State. It has been created with the aims of rewilding captive-born South China tigers and for South African biodiversity conservation in general. LVR was created in 2002 out of 17 defunct sheep farms, and efforts to return the overgrazed land to natural status are ongoing. The South China tigers at LVR for rewilding are kept confined to a tiger-proof camp complex of roughly 1.8 square kilometers, with other areas of the reserve being used to protect native South African species. The word "laohu" is a Chinese term for tiger.

== Reproduction and deaths ==
In April 2014 Madonna gave birth to three cubs, two females and one male. The father of the cubs is Tigerwoods.

On 20 November 2015, two South China tiger cubs were born at Laohu Valley. The mother is Cathay and the father is King Henry. The birth of these cubs brought the number of South China tigers within the care of Save China's Tigers in the Laohu Valley Reserve to twenty. At the time, this represented more than 20% of the world population of the world's most critically endangered tiger. However, in February 2016, one of the two cubs died, leaving nineteen South China tigers in the reserve.

== Obstacles ==
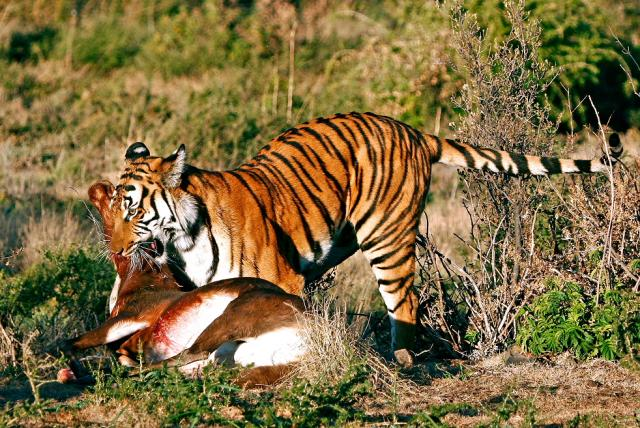
Stud Tiger 327 with blesbuck carcass

A difficulty faced by the project is the limited gene pool for South China tigers – all the South China tigers in Chinese zoos are descended from only six individuals caught in the 1950s.

The WWF says that the money is being spent in the wrong place and that the Amur tiger has a stronger chance of survival over these tigers.

== Controversies ==
Li accused her former husband, Stuart Bray, of using charitable funds for personal expenses. This was reported in the Daily Mail, which damaged the charity's reputation with the public. However, Stuart Bray was acquitted of misappropriation of charitable funds in a court case decision in October 2014.

== Allegations of misuse of funds ==
In 2013, Li accused her former husband Stuart Bray of using charitable funds for personal expenses.

== See also ==
- List of non-governmental organizations in the People's Republic of China
- Project Tiger, a similar tiger conservation program in India
