= WildTeam =

Organization

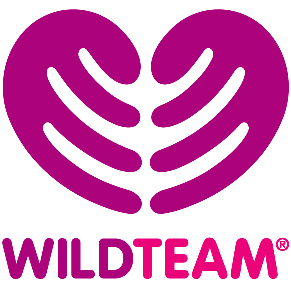
- Founded: 2003
- Type: Nonprofit
- Purpose: Environmentalism, Conservation, Ecology
- Location: Dhaka, Bangladesh
- Region served: Tiger Conservation Program, Counter Wildlife Trafficking, Water Sanitation And Hygiene (WASH) for climate vulnerable communities, Bay of Bengal Program, Alternate livelihood, Social awareness, Wildlife research,
- Method: Social marketing, research, consultancy
- Website: www.wildteam.org.bd

WildTeam is a local conservation organisation which began in 2003 as The Wildlife Trust of Bangladesh (a registered Bangladesh non-profit organisation) and the Sundarbans tiger project. The Sundarbans Tiger project started out as a Bangladesh Forest Department and University of Minnesota research initiative; focusing on the ecology and conservation of tigers in the Bangladesh Sundarbans. Between 2003 and 2008, the Wildlife Trust of Bangladesh carried out research and education work in relation to Bengal tiger, Hoolock gibbon, Asian elephant, and Asian black bear.

In 2008, the Sundarbans Tiger Project merged with the Wildlife Trust of Bangladesh. In 2012 the name was changed to "WildTeam" and the flagship project to "TigerTeam". WildTeam also registered as a charity in England and Wales in 2012, to support the Bangladesh work and to create a base to help save tigers and other wildlife internationally. In October 2013, WildTeam became a registered non-government organization in Bangladesh under the NGO Affairs Bureau. WildTeam is made up predominantly of Bangladesh staff, many of whom are from the local areas next to the Sundarbans, and some of whom have lost family members to tiger attacks. In 2011, WildTeam received the Bangabandhu Award for Wildlife Conservation, and in 2013 one of WildTeam's staff won the international Future for Nature Award. WildTeam's work is guided by the four core values of celebrating nature, believing in people, being grounded in reality, and acting fearlessly. Another core belief of WildTeam is to use positive/inclusive approaches to celebrate the wildlife we have now and to move towards an even brighter future.

== Mission ==
WildTeam's mission is "carrying out activities to improve the conservation status of key species and habitats in Bangladesh, and developing partnerships, tools, and platforms to build the capacity of organisations and individuals to carry out effective conservation.".

== Key activities ==
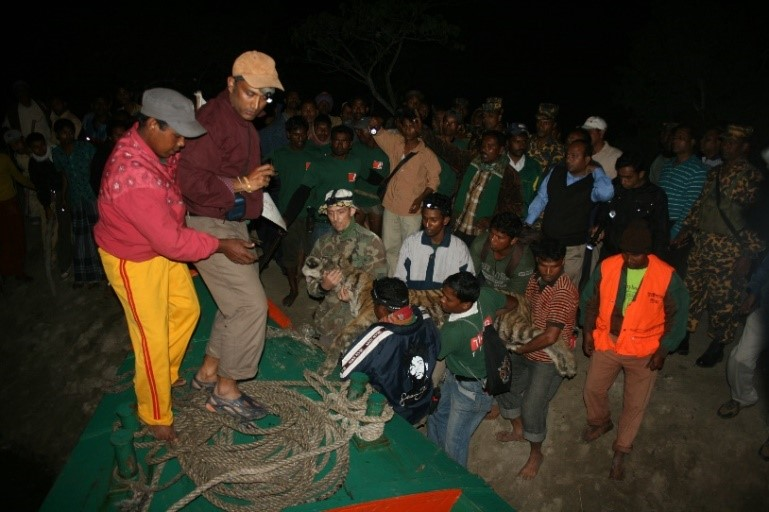
WildTeam with the help of Village Tiger Response Team (VTRT) and the Bangladesh Forest Department, immobilized a wild tiger in the Sundarbans on 20 February 2011. It was the first time that a tiger returned to the forest alive after entering a village in the Bangladesh Sundarbans.

WildTeam follows the vision of the Bangladesh Tiger Action Plan; "Protected tiger landscapes in Bangladesh, where wild tigers thrive at optimum carrying capacities and which continue to provide essential ecological services to mankind".

The focus of WildTeam's work is the Bangladesh Sundarbans. WildTeam have identified tiger, tiger prey, and tiger habitat as the biological targets; for the purpose of directing conservation actions and measuring the impact of those actions. The threats to those three biological targets have been assessed and prioritised; with tiger poaching, deer poaching, and stray tiger killing emerging as the current highest priority threats to address.

WildTeam's policy and research work has helped the Bangladesh government to update the Wildlife Act so that there are stiffer penalties for tiger poachers and wildlife-related crime. WildTeam has also worked with the Bangladesh Forest Department to create the first ever Bangladesh Tiger Action Plan. To improve forest protection, WildTeam worked with the Bangladesh Forest Department and the European Union to design a new patrolling, staffing, and infrastructure approach for the Sundarbans.

The main set of WildTeam alternatives/incentives activities have been focused on empowering local communities to save tigers that stray into their village areas. This has been enabled by the establishment of Village Tiger Response Teams (VTRTs), distributed across the village areas bordering the forest. Each VTRT is made up of 5-10 volunteers who elect their own members/leaders and are trained to scare tigers back into the forest, monitor local tiger conflict incidents, and stop other villagers from killing tigers. Since their inception in 2005, the VTRTs have, for the first time in Bangladesh, saved stray tigers by scaring them back into the forest.

As part of a four phase social marketing campaign, WildTeam is carrying out communication/education activities, designed together with the local Sundarbans communities. To build national awareness and support for tiger conservation, in 2013 WildTeam organised the Wild Rickshaw Challenge, which entailed 20 challengers peddling 400 km across Bangladesh from Teknaf to the Sundarbans.

In terms of research, WildTeam have carried out the first ever study of tiger home ranges in the Sundarbans mangrove habitat, the first study of Sundarbans tiger morphology, and the first Sundarbans tiger population monitoring survey. WildTeam have contributed to WWF-lead studies looking at the potential effects of sea-level rise on Sundarbans habitat loss, and a landscape approach to tiger conservation, an action-selection framework for reducing human-tiger conflict, and a threats assessment approach. In terms of social research, WildTeam have carried out a study to investigate the scale of prey poaching, and uncovered local perceptions of human-tiger conflict.

== WildTeam UK ==
The UK team focus on building the capacity of organisations and individuals to design and deliver projects that can have a measurable conservation impact. They do this work through specialist one-to-one support, and delivering online and class-based training workshops. The UK team have built capacity in such organisations as WCS Russia, EIA, North Queensland Dry Tropics, and the National Trust for Nature Conservation.

== Partners ==
National partners in Bangladesh that have collaborated, supported, or helped guide WildTeam include The Bangladesh Forest Department, the Bangladesh Ministry of Environment and Forest, Guidetours LTD, Wildeye, the Bangladesh Cetacean Biodiversity Project, Banglalink, University of Dhaka, Jahangirnagar University and Khulna University.

International partners/supporters/advisers of WildTeam include the United States Agency for International Development, United States Fish and Wildlife Service, Save the Tiger Fund, the University of Minnesota, the University of Kent, the Zoological Society of London, the Wildlife Conservation Society, the International Union for Conservation of Nature, Youngone, Futerra, the Rufford Foundation, and Wildlife Vets International
