= Li Quan (wildlife conservationist) =

Beijing-born tiger and wildlife conservationist

- 全莉
- Born: Li Quan; 1962; Beijing, China
- Occupation: Conservationist
- Years active: 1999–present
- Organization(s): Save China's Tigers (founder); China Tiger Revival (current)
- Notable work: Rewilded: Saving the South China Tiger (2010)
- Partner: Stuart Bray (divorced August 2012)
- Website: http://chinatigerrevival.org.uk/

Li Quan (born 1962; 全莉) is a Beijing-born wildlife conservationist who lives in London.

== Biography ==
=== Background ===
Li Quan is a graduate of Beijing University, and holds a dual MBA/MA degree from the Wharton Business School and the Lauder Institute at the University of Pennsylvania. Prior to her entrance into the tiger conservation scene, she worked as global head of licensing at the Italian fashion conglomerate, Gucci and also as an executive at Benetton.

=== Save China's Tigers ===
In 2000, she founded the tiger conservation charity Save China's Tigers in the United Kingdom, focused on preventing the extinction of the South China tiger, which is classified as critically endangered. She and her husband headed the organization together until their divorce. She believes the species can be recuperated at a wildlife sanction based in South Africa with the ultimate goal of rewilding in China. She was removed in July 2012 from the board of Save China's Tigers by her husband, after that she divorced him and left the organization.

=== China Tiger Revival ===
After her divorce with her husband and leaving Save China's Tigers, she started a new tiger conservation charity, named China Tiger Revival, based in London. David Tang, a Hong Kong businessman, had held an event at the China Tang restaurant in the Dorchester Hotel in London on 3 October 2013 to assist raising funds for the charity.

=== Controversy ===
She had accused her former husband, Stuart Bray, of misappropriation of charitable funds for personal expenses. In October 2014, a judge ruled in her ex-husband's favour in-regards to the allegations. She personally denied misusing any charitable funds herself.
