= Kalkfontein Nature Reserve =

Nature reserve in Free State, South Africa

Kalkfontein Nature Reserve is situated in the southernmost part of the Free State, of South Africa, on the road (R701) between Bethulie and Smithfield about 15 km from Bethulie, where the Orange River and the Caledon River come together.

== Wildlife ==
Include: blesbok, black wildebeest, springbok, eland, grey rhebok, gemsbok, reedbuck, impala, kudu, red hartebeest and zebra, Cape buffalo, southern white rhinoceros and south-central black rhinoceros.

== See also ==
Department: Tourism.
