= Vanderkloof Dam =

Dam between Northern Cape and Free State, South Africa

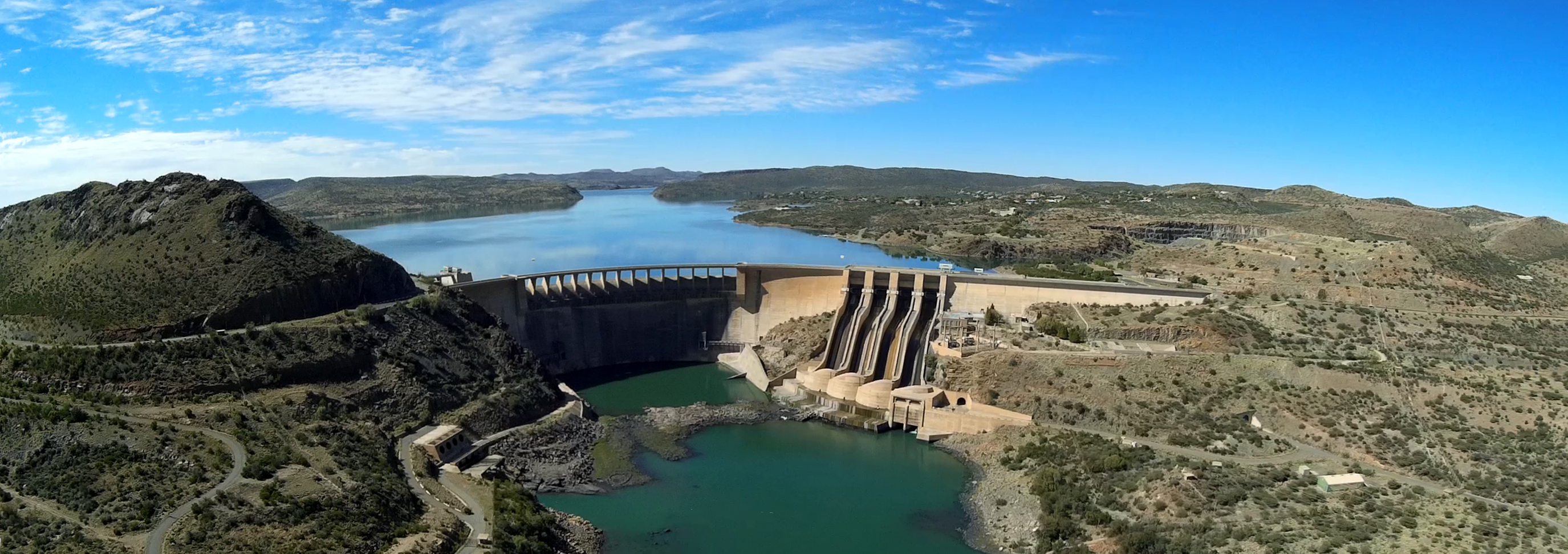

- Location within Northern Cape Location within South Africa
- Official name: Vanderkloof Dam
- Country: South Africa
- Location: Between Northern Cape and Free State
- Coordinates: 29.99222°S 24.73167°E
- Construction began: 1973
- Opening date: 1977
- Owner: Department of Water Affairs

Dam and spillways
- Type of dam: Arch dam
- Impounds: Orange River
- Height: 108 m (354 ft)
- Length: 756 m (2,480 ft)

Reservoir
- Creates: Vanderkloof Dam Reservoir
- Total capacity: 3,236 million cubic metres (114.3×10^{9} cu ft)
- Surface area: 133.402 km^{2} (51.507 sq mi)

Power Station
- Operator: Eskom
- Turbines: 2
- Installed capacity: 240 MW (320,000 hp); 360 MW (480,000 hp) (max)
- Annual generation: 932 GWh (3,360 TJ)

The Vanderkloof Dam (originally the P. K. Le Roux Dam) is situated approximately 130 km (81 mi) downstream from Gariep Dam and is fed by the Orange River, South Africa's largest river. Vanderkloof Dam is the second-largest dam in South Africa (in volume), having the highest dam wall in the country at 108 metres (354 ft). The dam was commissioned in 1977; it has a capacity of 3,187.557 million cubic metres (2,584,195 acre⋅ft) and a surface area of 133.43 square kilometres (51.52 sq mi) when full. Other rivers flowing into this dam are the Berg River, two unnamed streams coming in from the direction of Reebokrand, the Knapsak River, Paaiskloofspruit, Seekoei River, Kattegatspruit and the Hondeblaf River, in a clockwise direction.

The Town of VanderKloof has been established on the left bank of the dam, with the main town road entrance just up the way from the dam wall, with holiday resorts and parks, such as Rolfontein Nature Reserve (Photos Wiki Commons)

== See also ==
- List of reservoirs and dams in South Africa

== Gallery ==
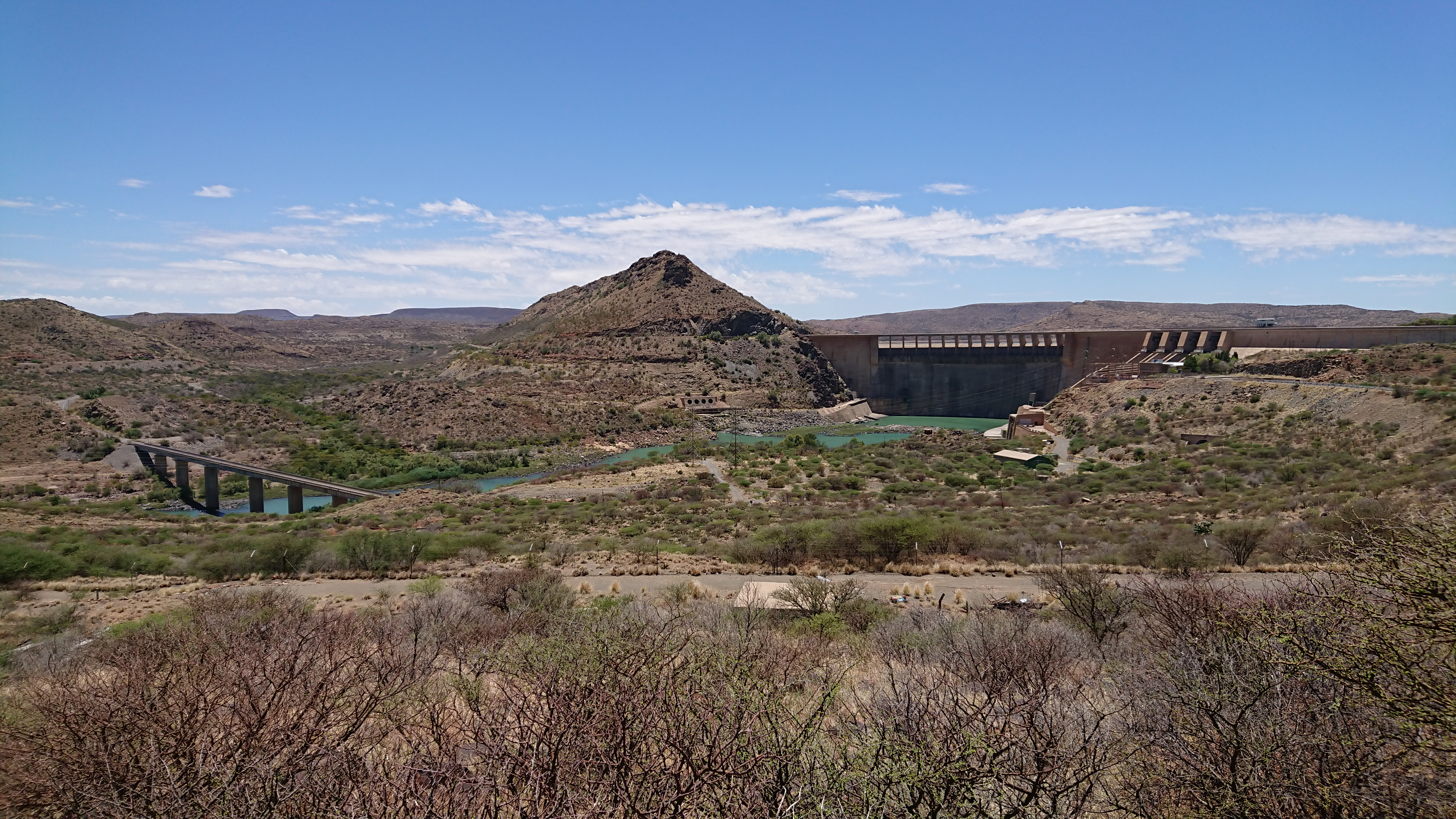
Right side look onto the dam

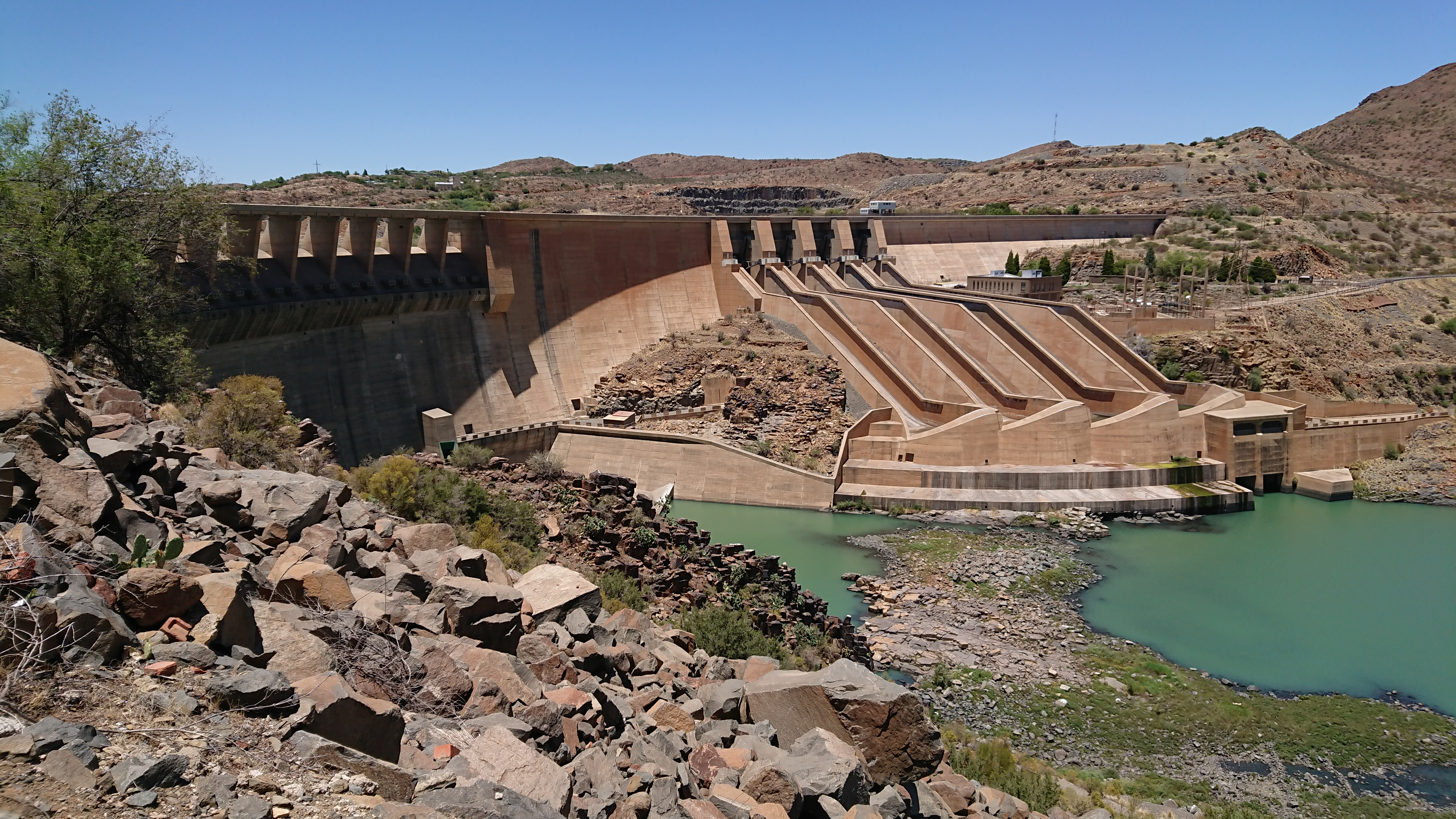

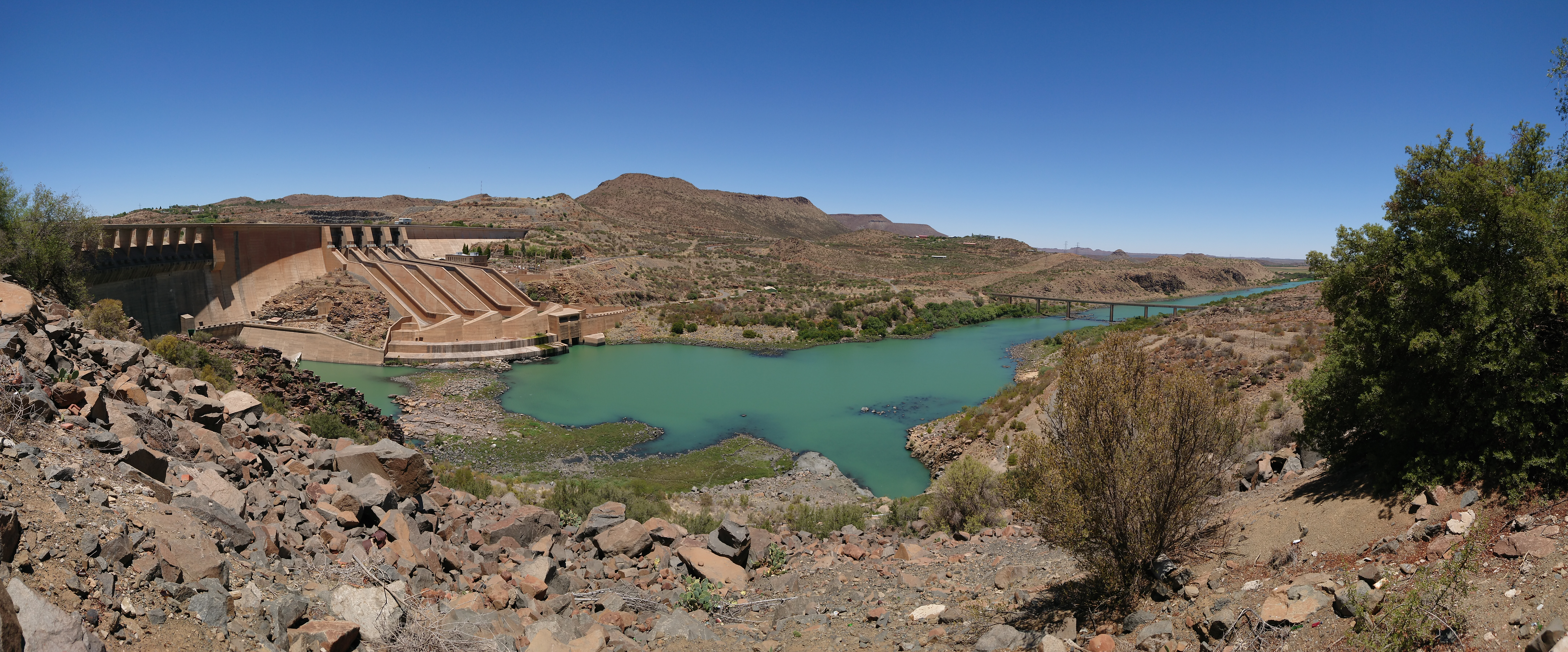

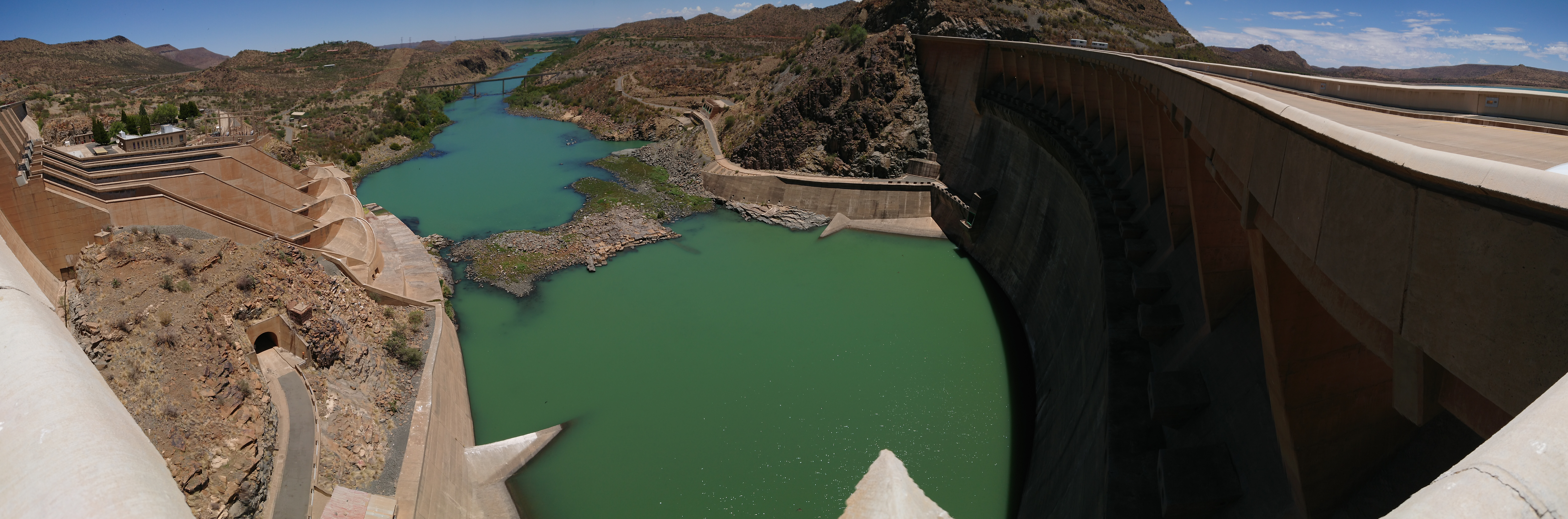

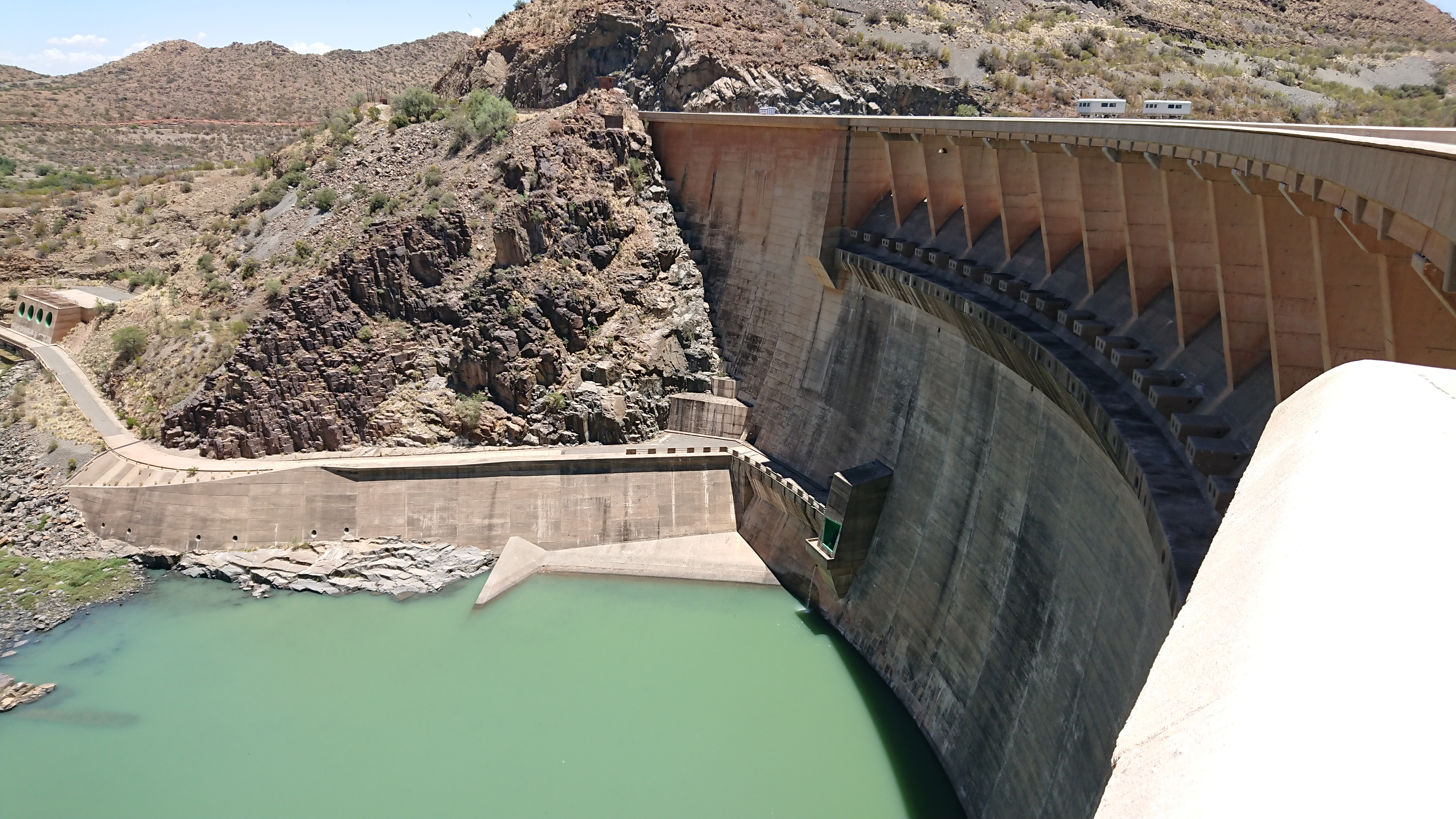

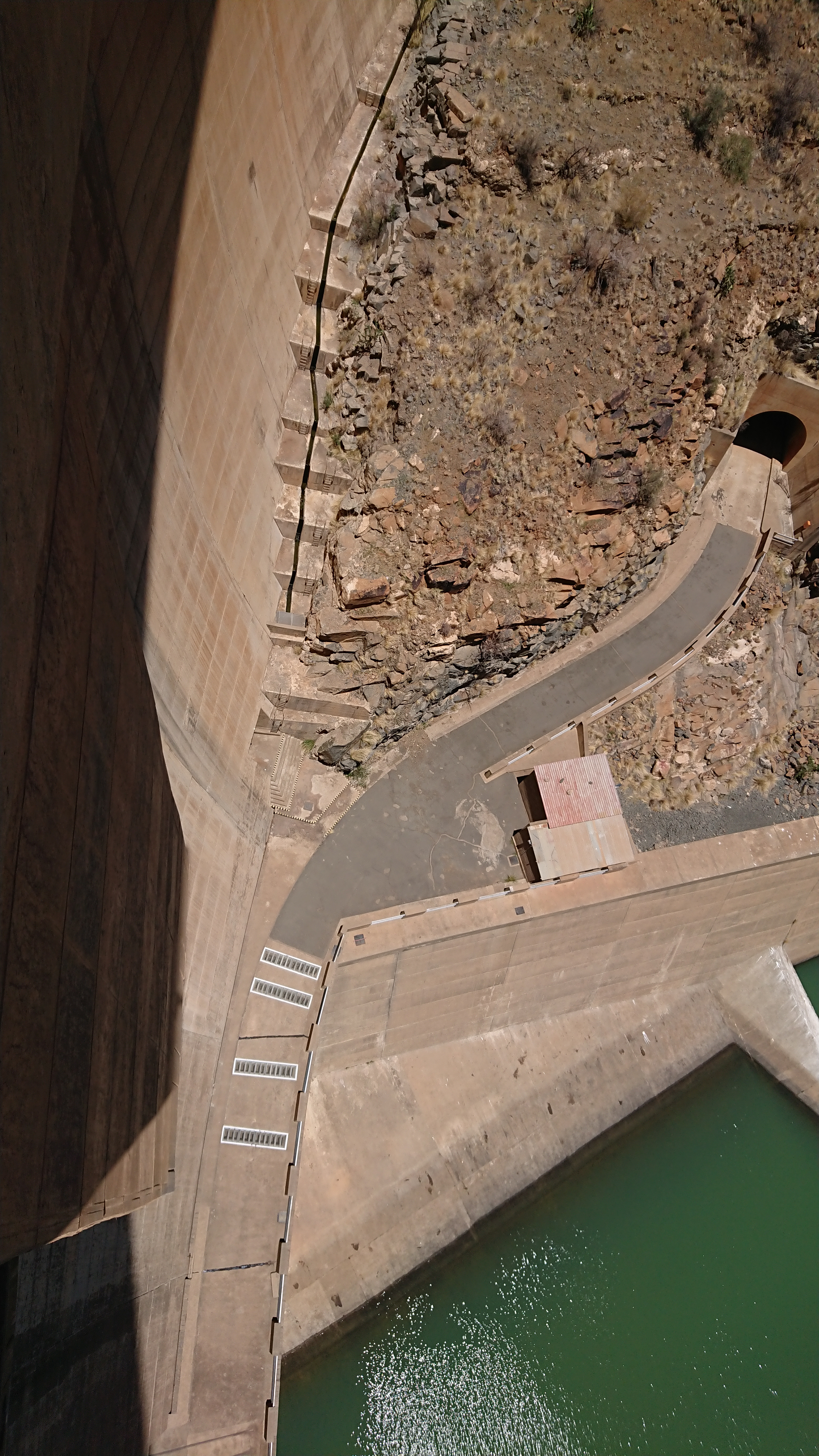

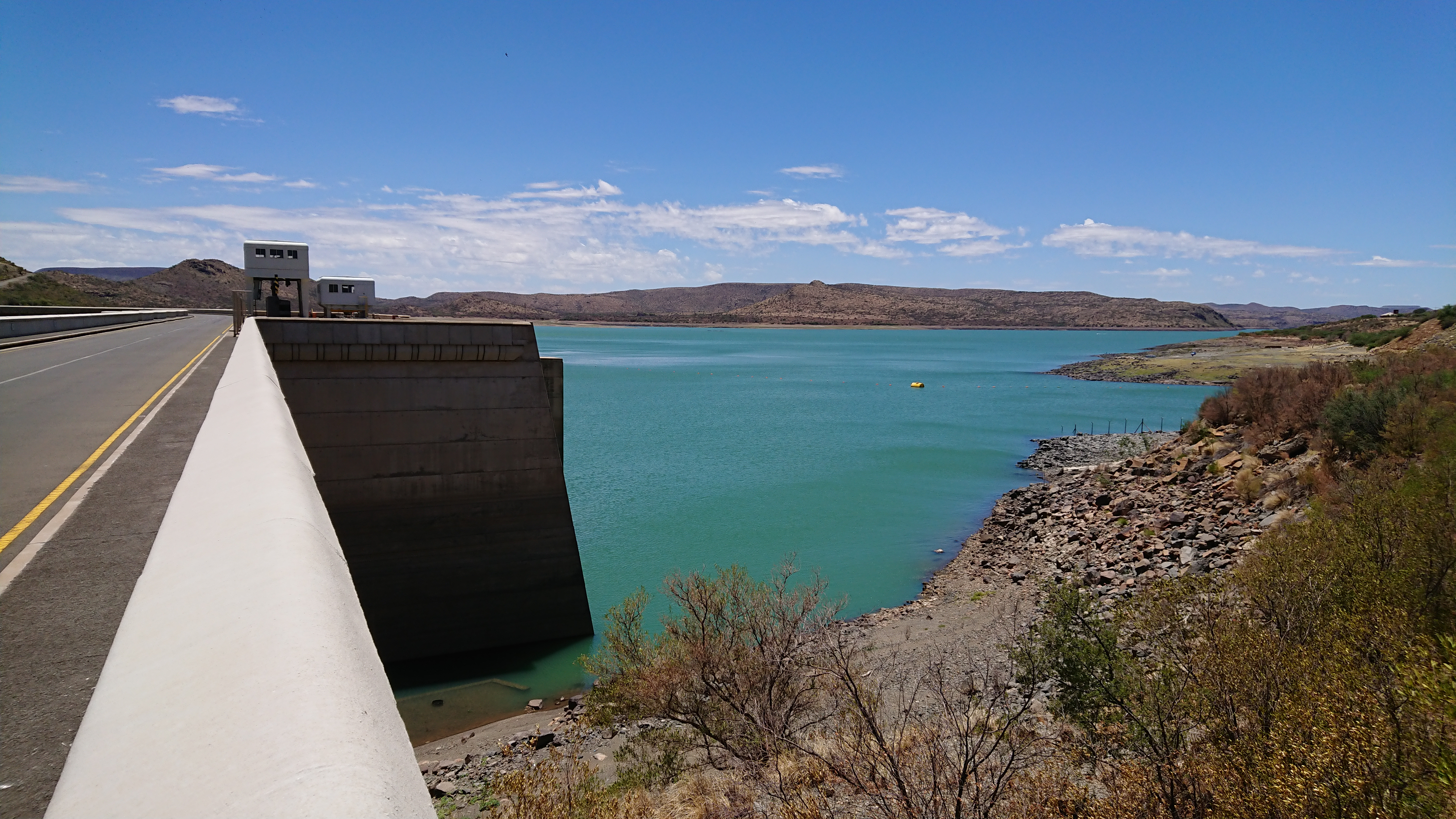

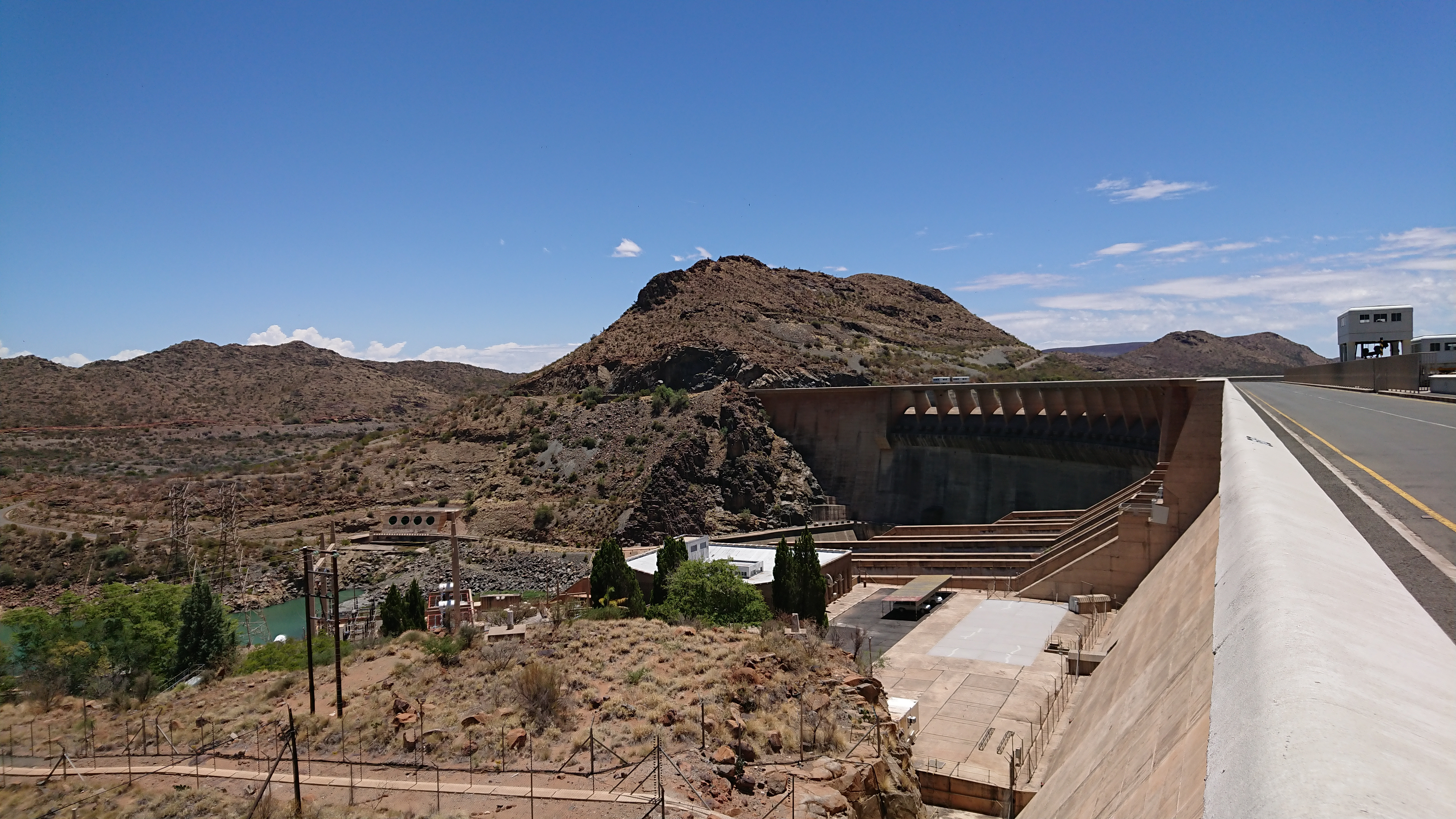

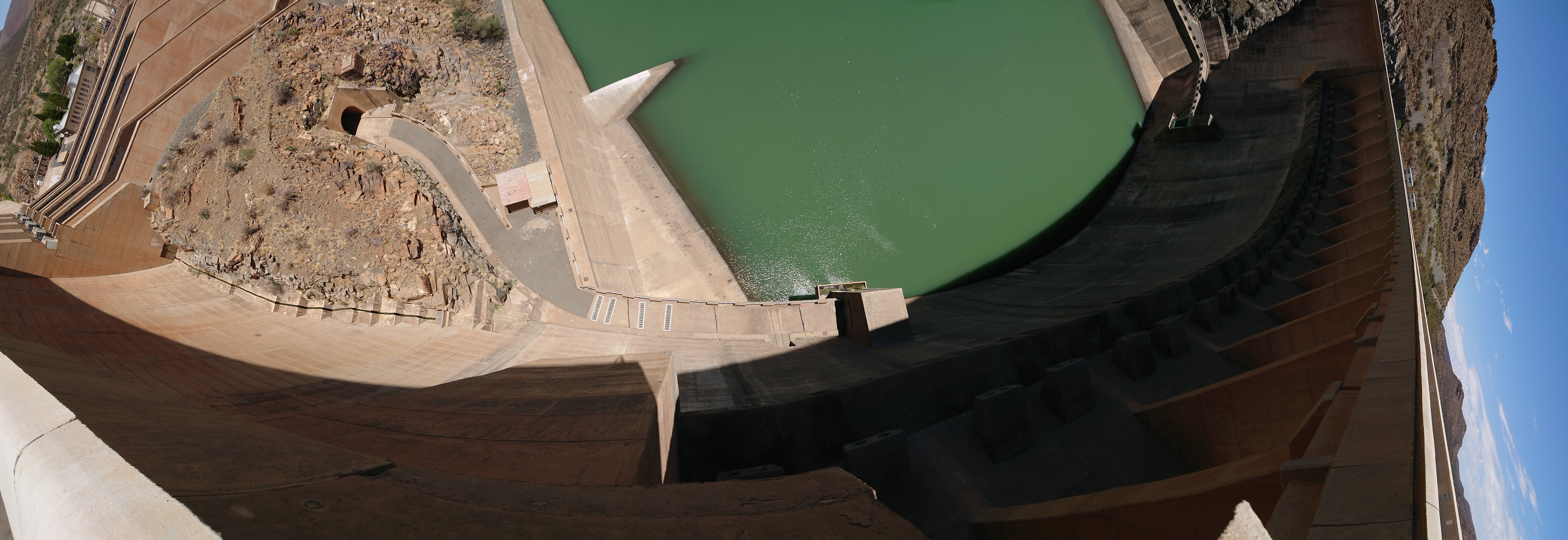
