= Sara Houcke =

British animal tamer

Sara Houcke (born 22 March 1977), also known as The Tiger Whisperer, is a professional animal tamer who began working for the "Greatest Show on Earth" program at the Ringling Bros. and Barnum & Bailey Circus in 1999. Born into a centuries-old family of circus performers, she began training from a young age in various forms of circus acts. She joined a German circus upon reaching adulthood before becoming a multi-year tiger and elephant trainer at the Ringling Bros. Circus. Later, she joined the Grand Cirque de Saint Petersburg in the early 2010s and has remained caretaker of the animal menagerie and performer since.

== Childhood ==
Born in Torquay, England, to Sacha Houcke, a circus zebra and elephant handler, and Judith Benson, a once professional dancer who toured with the Barnum's Kaleidoscape act, Houcke is part of a seven-generational line of European circus performers that first started in the early 1800s. Her tiger-taming relatives include Gilbert Houcke and Sarah Rancy. Having grown up in the circus, she began performances at the age of two as a child clown while touring in Switzerland and later, by age 11, as a gymnastics performer in the animal act. Her parents divorced when she was 15 and, alongside her younger sister, she was sent to a private school in Switzerland where she had to choose a vocation. She chose to study hairdressing to appease the school, but had no intention of doing any job outside of the circus.

== Career ==
When she was 17, Houcke accepted a job offer to work with animals in a German circus. In 1997, she was performing in Massy, France, for the circus involving a solo horse act. Approached by the vice president for talent and production for the Ringling Bros. circus, Tim Holst, she was offered a position as a zebra trainer. Not long after, she was instead officially hired in 1999 to become the trainer for the eight tigers at the Ringling Bros. circus during their United States tour working with veteran trainer Josip Marcan.

She also videotaped her interactions and daily activities with the tigers, which resulted in her being invited onto multiple news broadcasts and interview shows, including the Today Show and Extra. Houcke is noted as having different mannerisms with the tigers as compared to past circus tamers, positively giving them instructions instead of using whips and other tools. Her performances also forgo common mainstay items of past tamers, including flaming hoops and multistage platforms. The popularity of her act resulted in the circus including her in top billing for the show, which, as noted by The New York Times, has not been the case since Gunther Gebel-Williams was the head tiger tamer at the circus. The nature of her performance including hand feeding and using quiet commands in English and German has resulted in her being dubbed "the tiger whisperer".

Through the circus's conservation work, the Ringling Bros. Center for Elephant Conservation was built in Florida and one of the elephants born in April 2002 was named Sara after Houcke. Her performances starting in 2003 would feature elephants in addition to tigers. She later left the Ringling Bros. circus and, by 2012, was working with the Grand Cirque de Saint Petersburg as a tiger and elephant trainer, specifically Indian elephants and Siberian tigers. She is also in charge of the circus' entire animal menagerie.

== Personal life ==
Houcke had a son in 2012.
