= Land of the Leopard National Park =

Park in the Russian Far East

- Russian: национа́льный парк «Земля́ леопа́рда»
- IUCN category II (national park)
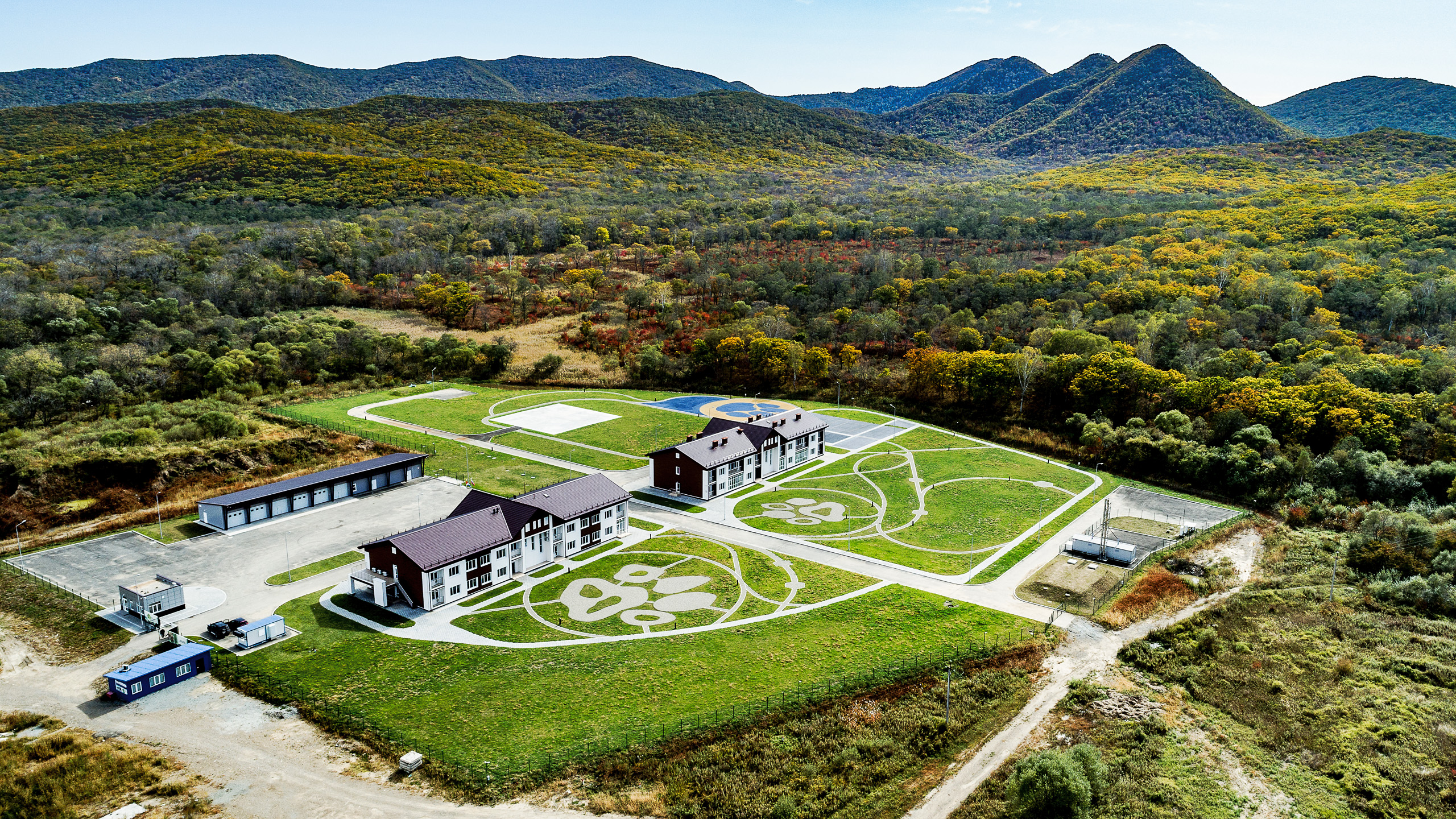
- Facilities in Land of the Leopard National Park

- Location within Russia
- Coordinates: 43°00′N 131°25′E
- Area: 2,799 km^{2} (1,081 sq mi)
- Established: April 5, 2012
- Website: http://leopard-land.ru/

Land of the Leopard National Park (also called "Leopard Land") is a national park in Primorsky Krai in the Russian Far East, situated roughly 70 km (43 miles) southwest of the city of Vladivostok and covering an area of around 2,799 km^{2} (1,081 sq mi) to the west of the Razdolnaya River. Gazetted in April 2012, the park was established to protect the Amur leopard (Panthera pardus orientalis), a subspecies of leopard (P. pardus) widely considered to be the world's rarest felid, at one point having an all-time low population of possibly 30 individuals. As of 2023, it is estimated that between 100–200 Amur leopards live in the wild; a further 100–200 live in North American and European zoos, with many litters being raised successfully through captive breeding programs. The park was formed through the merger of Kedrovaya Pad Nature Reserve, Barsovy Federal Wildlife Refuge and Borisovkoye Plateau Regional Wildlife Refuge with a new territory along the border with China.

== History ==
By the beginning of the 21st century, the Amur leopard's wild population was on the verge of extinction. As a result of pressures such as illegal poaching and wildfires, the once-vast habitat of the cats—which is partly shared by the equally rare Siberian tiger (Panthera tigris)—had shrunk to such a small zone in the southwest of Primorsky Krai that drastic measures were decided upon. Kedrovaya Pad Nature Reserve had been established since 1916, with several known leopard breeding grounds, but only expansion of the protected area and integrated management of the existing natural territories could help mitigate the loss of the subspecies.

The Land of the Leopard National Park was then founded on April 5, 2012, thanks to the efforts of ecologists and personal attention to the problem of Sergey Ivanov, the former Director of the Executive Office of the President of the Russian Federation. Its territory in the area of 262 th. ha has covered the most part of the rare predator's habitat including the land of Khasansky and Nadezhdinsky Districts of Primorye, the Ussuriysky Urban District, as well as a little part of Vladivostok city.

== Ecoregion and climate ==
Land of the Leopard National Park is situated within the Manchurian mixed forests ecoregion of Far Eastern Russia, at the meeting point of Northeastern China and North Korea. The environment is considered a humid continental climate, warm summer subtype (Köppen climate classification . This climate is characterized by mild summers (only 1–3 months exceed 10 °C (50.0 °F)) and cold and frigid winters, having monthly precipitation less than one-tenth of the wettest summer month.

== Biodiversity ==
Land of the Leopard National Park has been established for the protection of the Amur leopard. Siberian tiger, Eurasian lynx, and 54 other mammal species living in the park. The black vulture is among the 184 bird species recorded. In 2017, the Amur leopard's population in the park had reportedly risen to 84 adults and 14 kittens.

== Activities ==
The Land of the Leopard National Park is faced with an extraordinary task—the protection and conservation of the only wild Amur leopard population in the world, hence why a persistent battle against poaching and fires has been fought here. The food chains are being monitored, from the ground-up. Community outreach with local residents and farmers is vital to educating future generations. These measures have resulted in a considerable increase in the number of the wild cats and an upward trend in population. The main task of scientific research conducted by Land of the Leopard is study and long-time monitoring of Amur leopard and Siberian tiger populations for preserving and restoring their numbers. Photomonitoring, winter route census based on traces in snow, as well as collection and analysis of scat help the scientists to determine the number of leopards and tigers, to study their diets, to reveal possible diseases and peculiarity of their behaviour. At present, camera traps are used to monitor wildlife. The largest net of camera traps consisting of more than 400 units in an area of 362000 ha. After sorting hundreds of thousands of shots, the scientists identify each leopard and tiger according to a unique pattern of spots and stripes on their fur.

== Tourism ==
Ecotourism is one of the best ways to touch the unique nature of the southwest of Primorsky Krai and learn all about the Amur leopard. The gateway of the national park for visitors is the visit center "Land of the Leopard" located in the village of Barabash. There is also an opportunity to see and photograph wildlife from behind blinds.

== See also ==
Northeast China Tiger and Leopard National Park
