= Northeast China Tiger and Leopard National Park =

National park in Heilongjiang and Jilin provinces, China

- Chinese: 东北虎豹国家公园体
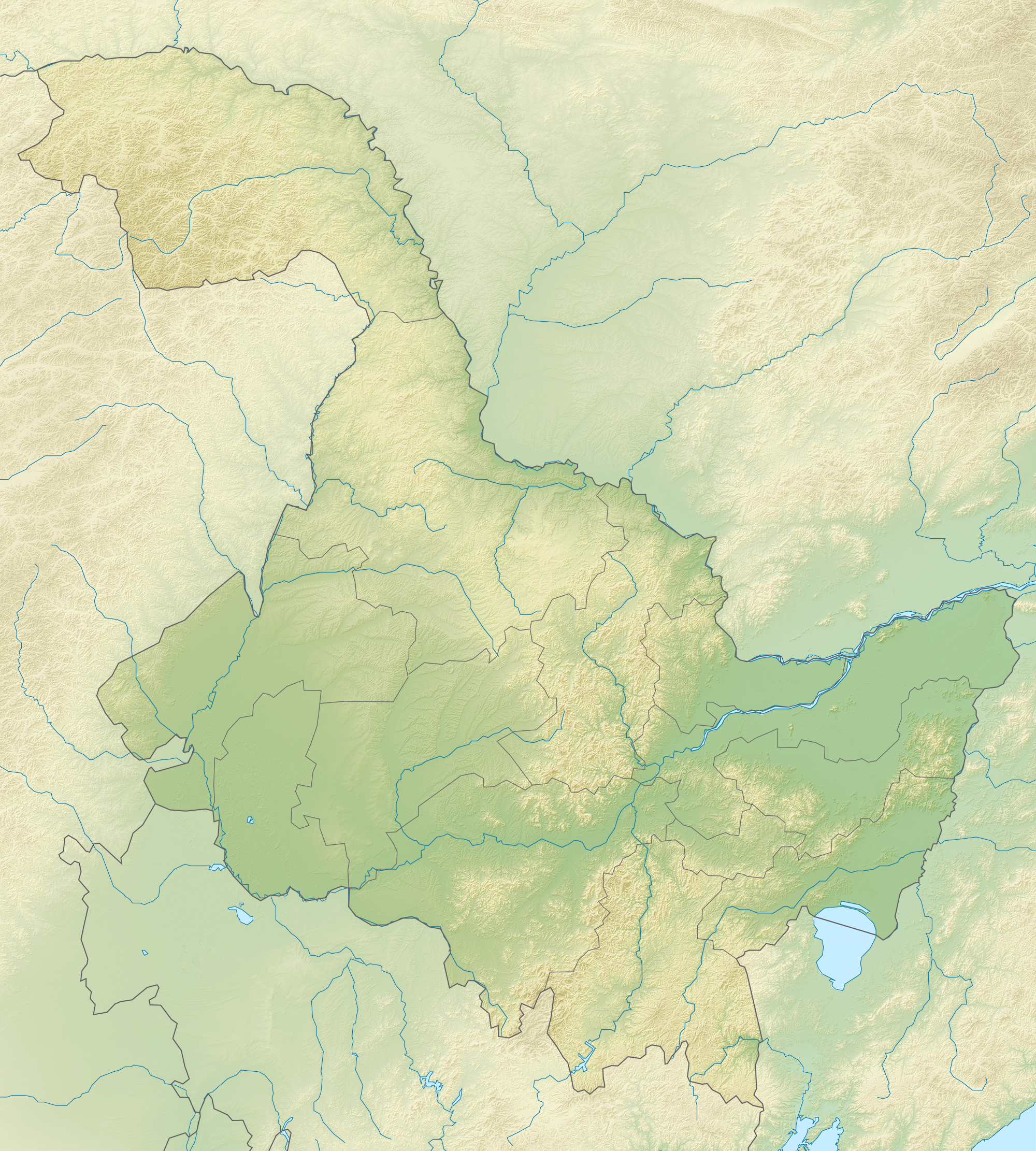
- Location within Heilongjiang
- Location: Jilin and Heilongjiang Provinces
- Coordinates: 43°20′N 130°11′E
- Area: 14,612 km^{2} (5,642 sq mi)
- Established: 2021
- Governing body: Northeast China Tiger and Leopard National Park Administration

Northeast China Tiger and Leopard National Park is a national park in northeastern China's Heilongjiang and Jilin Provinces spanning over an area of 14,612 km^{2} (5,642 sq mi) in the southern part of the Changbai Mountains. It borders Russia and North Korea in the east.

The national park was launched in 2017 with a pilot phase initially managed by the National Forestry and Grassland Administration; management was transferred in the same year to the Northeast China Tiger and Leopard National Park Administration, which is responsible for the coordination with provincial governments and departments, and for the protection of the national park's natural resources. During the pilot phase, industrial and mining enterprises in the area were closed; fences, buildings, farms, livestock and hunting gear were removed; wild animals were rescued and released, feeding points for wildlife were established, and restoration of fragmented habitat was initiated.

Coniferous and mixed broadleaf forest cover an area of 9,483 km^{2} (3,661 sq mi), providing habitat for 355 vertebrate species including the Siberian tiger, Amur leopard, brown bear, Asiatic black bear, Eurasian lynx, sable, sika deer, red deer, red-crowned crane and golden eagle.

== See also ==
Land of the Leopard National Park
