= Gunther Gebel-Williams =

American animal trainer (1934–2001)

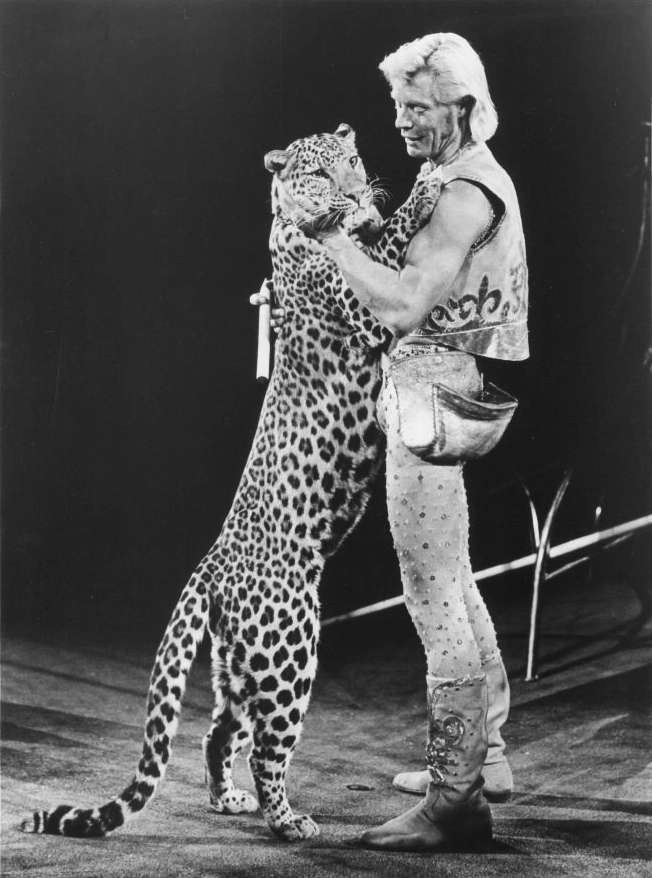
- Gunther Gebel-Williams with one of his trained leopards, circa 1977.
- Born: Gunther Gebel; September 12, 1934; Schweidnitz, Lower Silesia
- Died: July 19, 2001 (aged 66); Venice, Florida, United States
- Resting place: Venice Memorial Gardens, Florida
- Occupation: Animal trainer
- Spouses: Jeanette Williams (m. 1960; div. 1967) Sigrid Neubauer (m. 1968)
- Children: 2

Gunther Gebel-Williams (September 12, 1934 – July 19, 2001) was an animal trainer for Ringling Bros. and Barnum & Bailey Circus from 1968 to 1990.

== Early life ==
Gebel was born in Schweidnitz, Lower Silesia (now Świdnica, Poland). As a child, he and his mother relocated to Germany, in all probability as part of the expulsion of ethnic Germans, when Silesia was ceded to Poland after World War II. His father was missing in the Soviet Union.

== Career ==
Gebel and his mother started working for Circus Williams in Germany in 1947. When its owner suddenly died, the owner's widow asked the 18-year-old Gebel to become the animal trainer which began his career. He then took on the additional surname Williams.

Gebel-Williams came to prominence during the early days of television when the circus was still a popular form of entertainment. His appearances on television shows like The Ed Sullivan Show and The Tonight Show Starring Johnny Carson, in addition to his work with the Ringling Bros. and Barnum & Bailey Circus, accelerated his renown as a tamer primarily of elephants and tigers.

After retiring from the ring, he took a management position as Vice President of Animal Care for the circus. He passed down his skills as an animal trainer and performer to his son, Mark.

== Death ==
Gebel-Williams died of a brain tumor on July 19, 2001, in Venice, Florida.
