= Dave Salmoni =

Canadian animal trainer, entertainer and television producer

- Born: September 4, 1975 (age 51); Sarnia, Ontario, Canada
- Occupations: Animal trainer, entertainer, producer
- Years active: 2000–present

David "Dave" Salmoni (born September 4, 1975) is a Canadian animal trainer, entertainer and television producer. He has his own production company, Triosphere, which is based in South Africa and specializes in wildlife films. Dave has dedicated his life to animal conservation.

== Life and career ==
=== Personal life ===
Salmoni's mother, a competitive figure skating coach, and father, a chemical Scientist, fostered his love for the wild. Salmoni studied zoology at the Laurentian University in Sudbury, Ontario, and wrote his undergraduate thesis on tracking the hibernation of black bears. Also while in university, Salmoni was certified in the Chemical Immobilization of Wildlife and worked on an elk relocation project and at a white-tailed deer count station for the Ministry of Natural Resources.

Salmoni is very private about his personal life. He married HGTV personality, Debra Salmoni, in 2015. They have two children, son Thomas (born 2015), and daughter Elizabeth (born 2017). They reside in Toronto, though David's production company is based in South Africa.

=== Animal training ===
In 1998, Salmoni began his apprenticeship as an animal trainer at Bowmanville Zoological Park. Salmoni left Canada for South Africa in 2000 as part of the controversial Tiger "rewilding" project. Salmoni was attacked by one of his trained big cats named Bongo, a 227-kilogram (500 lb) male African lion in August 1999 in Ontario, which inspired his making of After the Attack.

=== Television ===
He has hosted and produced several television documentaries, including Living with Tigers, which describes the progress he and John Varty made as part of a controversial Bengal Tiger rewilding project, Into the Lion's Den and Sharks: Are They Hunting Us?, both for Discovery Channel. He starred in the show Animal Face-Off as a host and expert. He currently hosts and produces the Discovery Channel show Rogue Nature, as well as After the Attack and Into the Pride on Animal Planet.

Salmoni started production of a short series named Deadly Islands which premiered in 2014. This series consisted of Salmoni visiting some of the world's most remote islands where he would live side by side with some of the fiercest predators on the planet. During the short series he investigates how the inhabitants of these islands have lived so well and strived to survive despite the very harsh conditions. He visits places such as the famous Bear Island, Shark Island and Devil's Island, risking his own safety and even putting himself up as bait in one episode.

He also hosted Expedition Impossible, a Mark Burnett show on ABC in 2011.

==== TV shows ====
Salmoni appears in the following TV shows: Jimmy Kimmel Live! (2014-2020), Into the Lion's Den (2004), Animal Face-Off (2004), Sharks: Are They Hunting Us? (2006), Shark Tribe (2007), Rogue Nature (2007), After the Attack (2008), Into the Pride (2009), The Fran Drescher Show (2010), Savaged with Dave Salmoni (2010), Expedition Impossible (2011), Great Animal Escapes (2011), Deadly Islands (2014), Brothers in Blood: The Lions of Sabi Sand (2015), Pet Nation Renovation (2016-2017), Game of Homes (2016), and The Wendy Williams Show (2018), Big, Small & Deadly (2019).
