= Born Wild =

Born Wild may refer to:

- An alternative title for Running Wild (1992 film)
- An alternative title for The Young Animals
- Born Wild (film), a 2001 film directed by Patrick Leung
- Born Wild, a children's documentary
