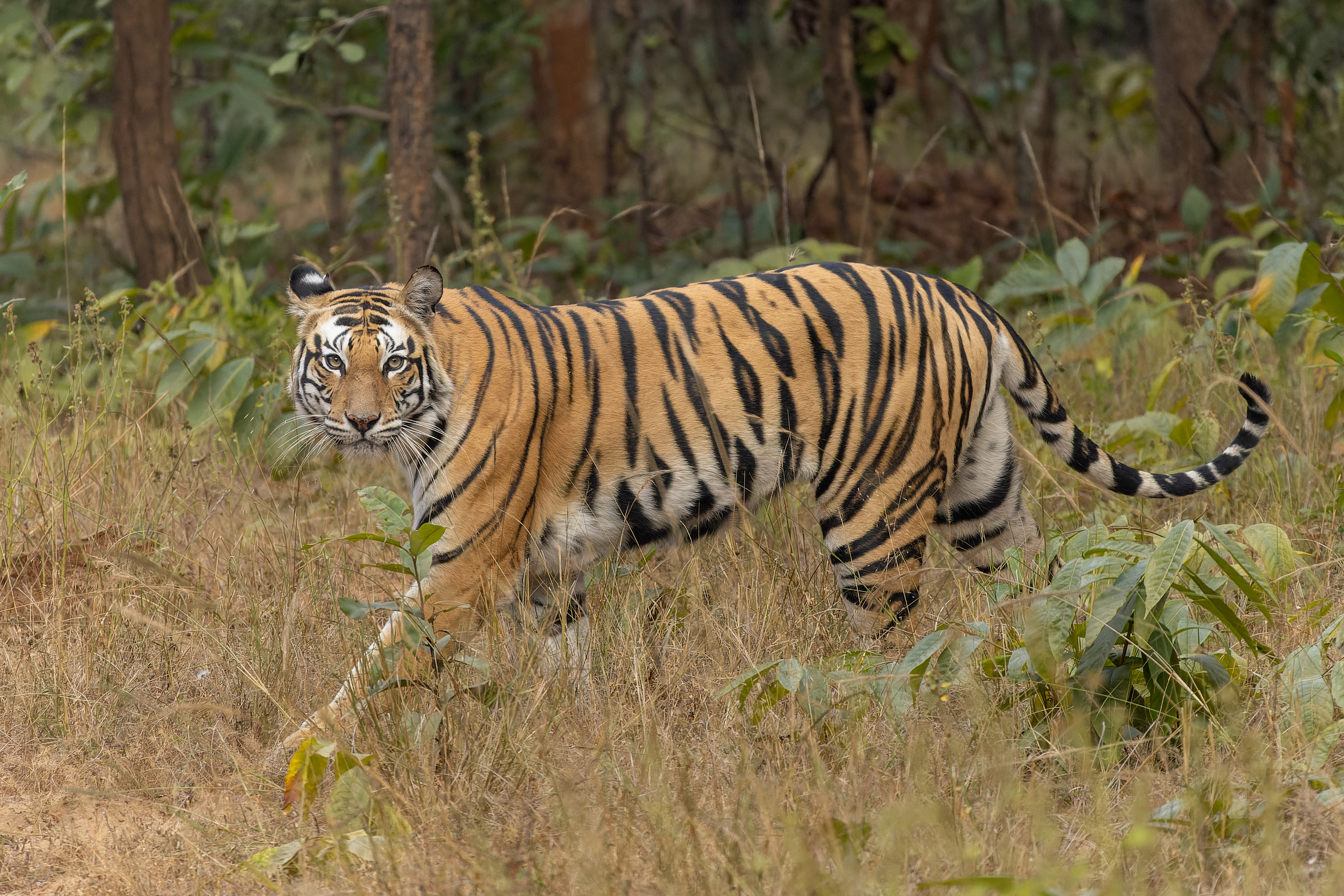
- Bengal tiger in Sanjay National Park

Scientific classification
- Kingdom: Animalia
- Phylum: Chordata
- Class: Mammalia
- Order: Carnivora
- Family: Felidae
- Genus: Panthera
- Species: P. tigris
- Subspecies: P. t. tigris
- Population: Bengal tiger
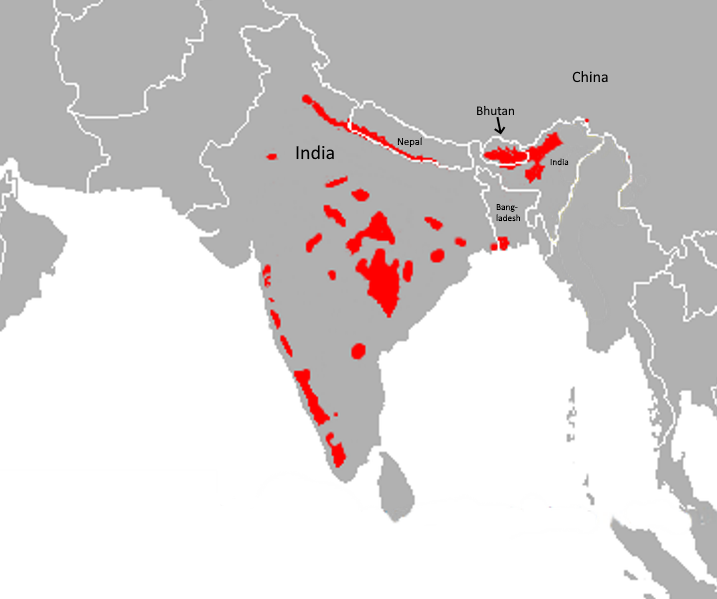
- Range of Bengal tiger in red

= Bengal tiger =

Tiger population on the Indian subcontinent

The Bengal tiger is a population of the Panthera tigris tigris subspecies. It ranks among the largest of wild cats. It is distributed from India, southern Nepal, Bangladesh, Bhutan to Southwestern China. Its historical range extended to the Indus Basin until the early 19th century, and it is thought to have been present in the Indian subcontinent since the Late Pleistocene about 12,000 to 16,500 years ago. It is threatened by poaching, habitat loss and habitat fragmentation.

As of 2022, the Bengal tiger population was estimated at 3,167–3,682 individuals in India, 316–355 individuals in Nepal, 131 individuals in Bhutan and around 125 individuals in Bangladesh. It is the national animal of India and Bangladesh.

== Taxonomy ==
Felis tigris was the scientific name used by Carl Linnaeus in 1758 for the tiger. It was subordinated to the genus Panthera by Reginald Innes Pocock in 1929. Bengal is the traditional type locality of the species and the nominate subspecies Panthera tigris tigris.

The validity of several tiger subspecies in continental Asia was questioned in 1999. Morphologically, tigers from different regions vary little, and gene flow between populations in those regions is considered to have been possible during the Pleistocene. Therefore, it was proposed to recognise only two subspecies as valid, namely P. t. tigris in mainland Asia, and P. t. sondaica in the Greater Sunda Islands and possibly in Sundaland. The nominate subspecies P. t. tigris constitutes two clades: the northern clade comprises the Siberian and Caspian tiger populations, and the southern clade all remaining continental tiger populations. The extinct and living tiger populations in continental Asia have been subsumed to P. t. tigris since the revision of felid taxonomy in 2017.

=== Phylogeny ===
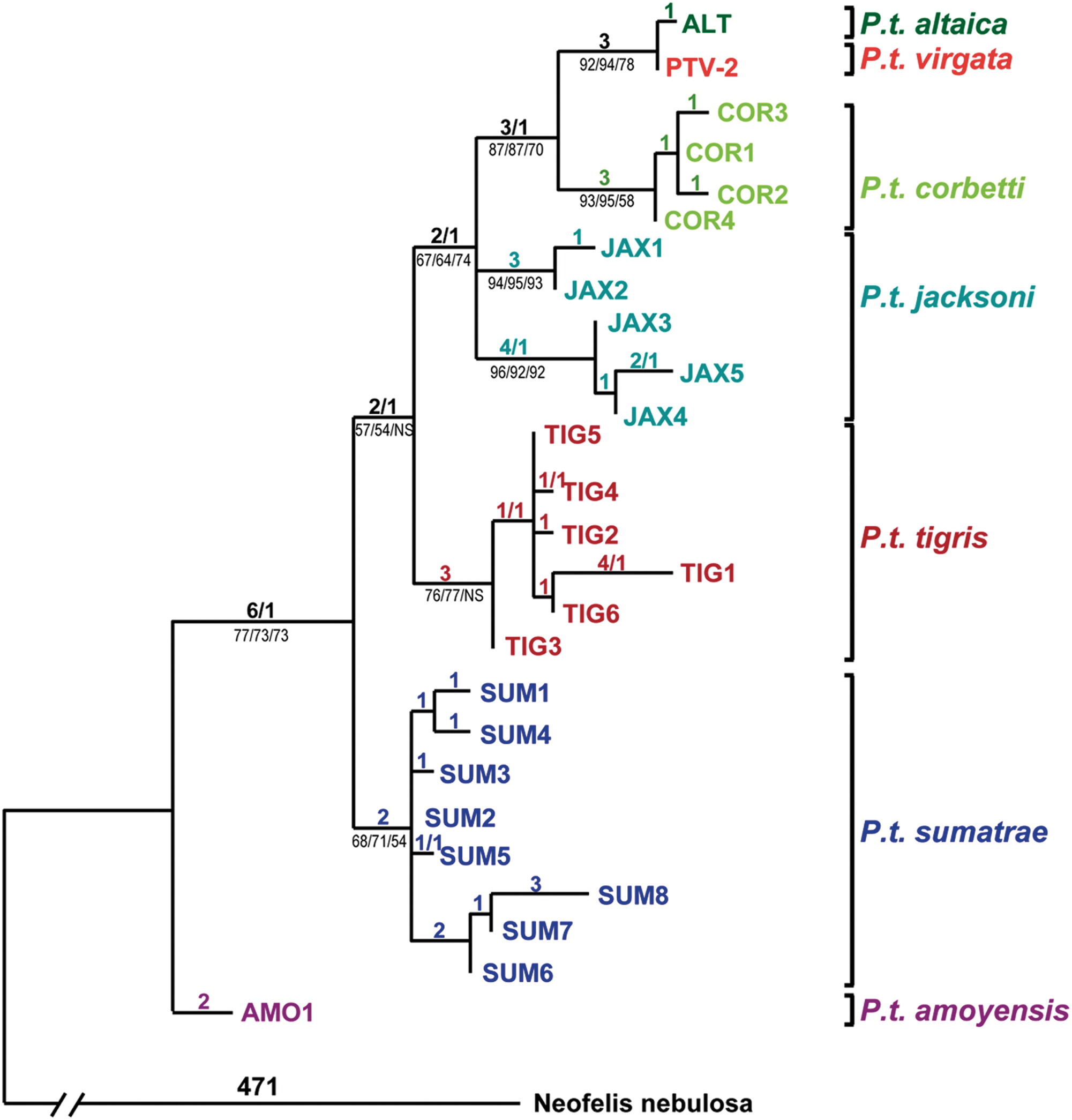
Phylogenetic relationship of tiger populations

Results of a genetic analysis of 32 tiger samples indicate that the Bengal tiger samples grouped into a different clade than the Siberian tiger samples.

=== Genetic ancestry ===
The Bengal tiger is defined by three distinct mitochondrial nucleotide sites and 12 unique microsatellite alleles. The pattern of genetic variation in the Bengal tiger corresponds to the premise that it arrived in India approximately 12,000 years ago. This is consistent with the lack of tiger fossils from the Indian subcontinent prior to the late Pleistocene, and the absence of tigers from Sri Lanka, which was separated from the subcontinent by rising sea levels in the early Holocene.

== Characteristics ==
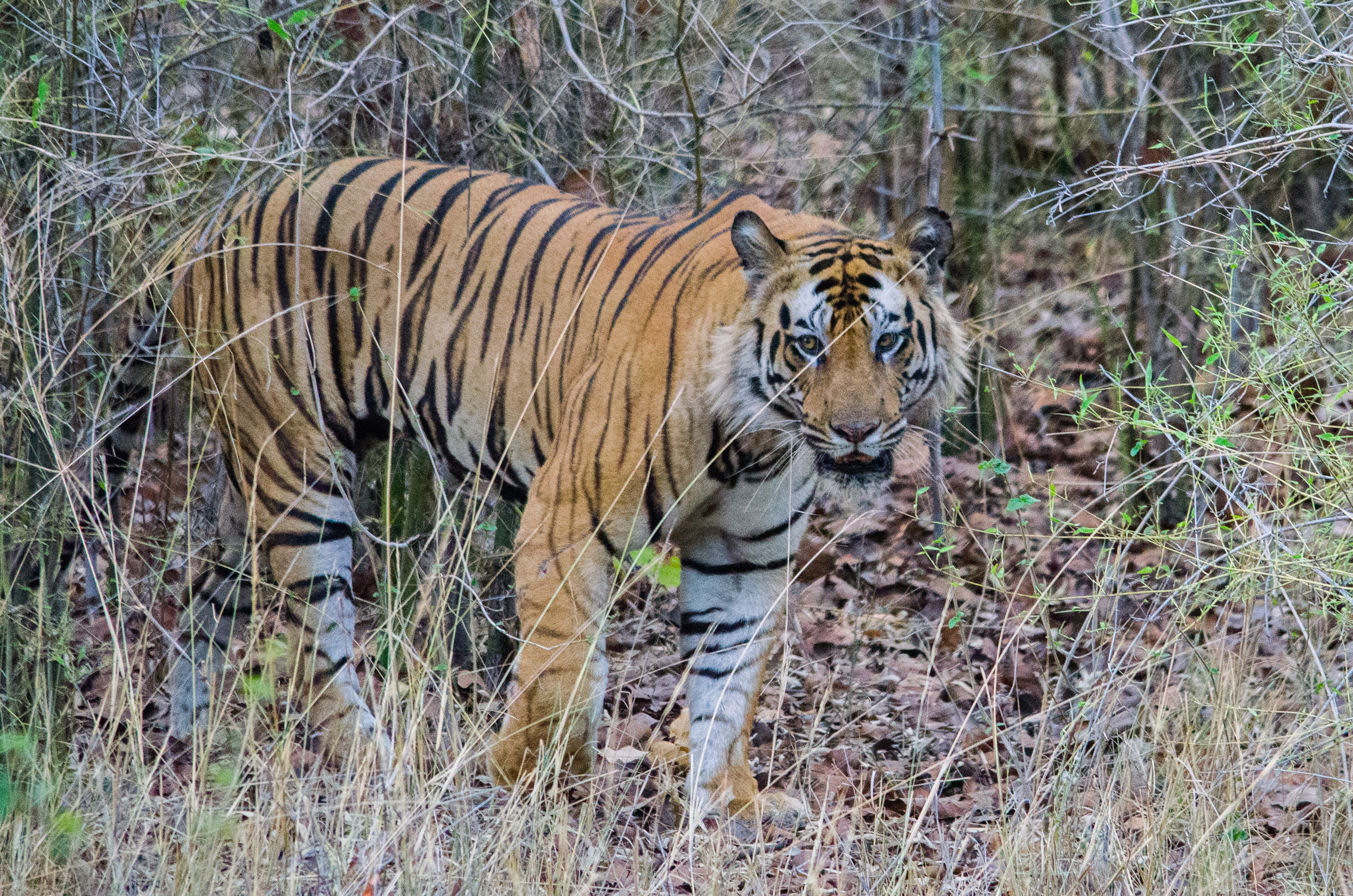
A tiger in Bandhavgarh National Park, Madhya Pradesh

The Bengal tiger's coat is yellow to light orange, with stripes ranging from dark brown to black; the belly and the interior parts of the limbs are white, and the tail is orange with black rings. The white tiger is a recessive mutant, which is reported in the wild from time to time in Assam, Bengal, Bihar and especially in the former State of Rewa. However, it is not an occurrence of albinism. In fact, only one fully authenticated case of a true albino tiger is known, and there are no confirmed cases of black tigers, except for a possible specimen examined in Chittagong in 1846. Fourteen Bengal tiger skins in the collection of the Natural History Museum, London have 21–29 stripes. Another recessive mutant is the golden tiger that has a pale golden fur with red-brown stripes. The mutants are very rare in nature.

=== Body weight and size ===
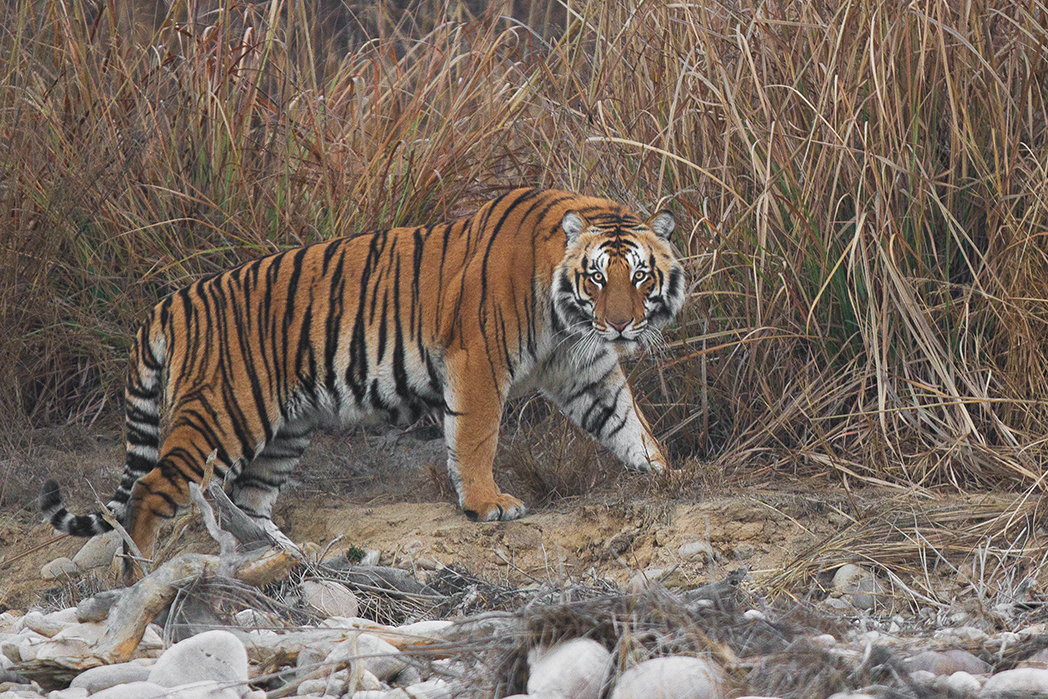
A male tiger in Jim Corbett National Park, Uttarakhand

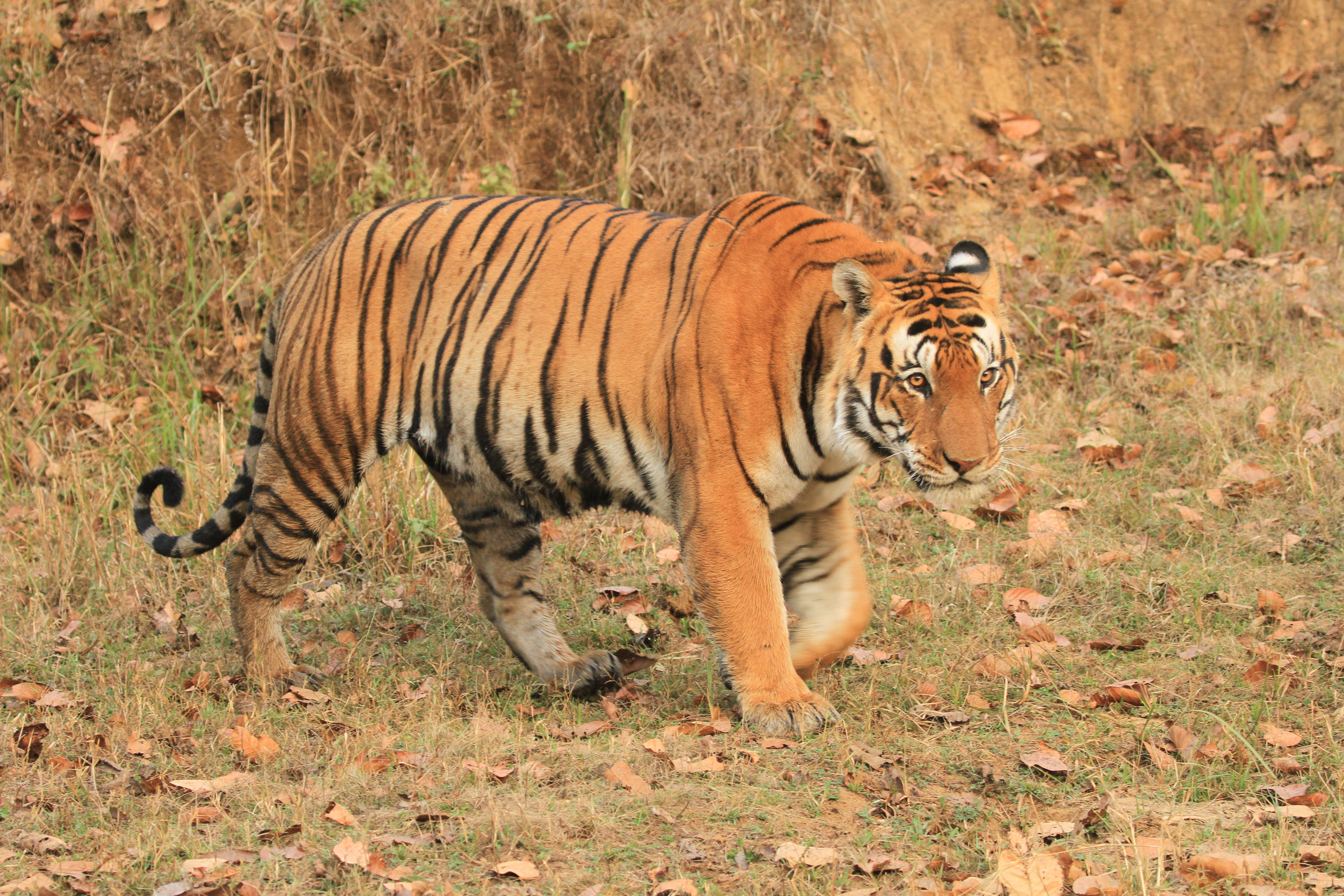
A tiger in Kanha National Park, Madhya Pradesh

The Bengal tiger ranks among the biggest wild cats alive. Males and female Bengal tigers in Panna Tiger Reserve reach a head-to-body length of 183–211 cm (72–83 in) and 164–193 cm (65–76 in) respectively, including a tail about 85–110 cm (33–43 in) long. Total length ranges from 283 to 311 cm (111 to 122 in) for male tigers and 255–285 cm (100–112 in) for female tigers. They typically range from 90–110 cm (35–43 in) in shoulder height.

Subadult males weigh between 130 and 170 kg (290 and 370 lb) and reach 200–260 kg (440–570 lb) when adult; subadult females weigh 80–100 kg (180–220 lb) and reach between 110 and 180 kg (240 and 400 lb) when adult. In central India, 42 adult male Bengal tigers weighed on average 190 kg (420 lb) with a range of 167–234 kg (368–516 lb); their total length was 282 cm (111 in) with a range of 267–312 cm (105–123 in), and their average shoulder height was 99 cm (39 in); 39 adult female Bengal tigers weighed an average of 132 kg (291 lb) with a maximum of 156 kg (344 lb) and an average total length of 254 cm (100 in) ranging from 239 to 277 cm (94 to 109 in). Several scientists indicated that adult male Bengal tigers in the Terai consistently attain more than 227 kg (500 lb) of body weight. Seven adult males captured in Chitwan National Park in the early 1970s had an average weight of 235 kg (518 lb) ranging from 200 to 261 kg (441 to 575 lb), and that of the females averaged 140 kg (310 lb) ranging from 116 to 164 kg (256 to 362 lb). Two male tigers captured in Chitwan National Park in the 1980s exceeded weights of 270 kg (600 lb) and are the largest free ranging tigers reported to date.

The smallest recorded weights for Bengal tigers are from the Bangladesh Sundarbans, where adult females weigh 75–80 kg (165–176 lb). Three tigresses from the Bangladesh Sundarbans had a mean weight of 76.7 kg (169 lb). The oldest female weighed 75 kg (165 lb) and was in a relatively poor condition at the time of capture. Their skulls and body weights were distinct from those of tigers in other habitats, indicating that they may have adapted to the unique conditions of the mangrove habitat. Their small sizes are probably due to a combination of intense intraspecific competition and small size of prey available to tigers in the Sundarbans, compared to the larger deer and other prey available to tigers in other parts.

The very large "Leeds Tiger" on display at Leeds City Museum, shot in 1860 near Mussoorie, had a body length of 371 cm (12 ft 2 in) at death. Two tigers shot in Kumaon District and near Oude at the end of the 19th century allegedly measured more than 370 cm (12 ft). But at the time, sportsmen had not yet adopted a standard system of measurement; some measured 'between the pegs' while others measured 'over the curves'. The greatest length of a tiger skull measured 41.3 cm (16.25 in) "over the bone"; this one was shot in the vicinity of Nagina in northern India.

In the beginning of the 20th century, a male tiger was shot in central India with a head and body length of 221 cm (87 in) between pegs, a chest girth of 150 cm (59 in), a shoulder height of 109 cm (43 in) and a tail length of 81 cm (32 in), which was perhaps bitten off by a rival male. This specimen could not be weighed, but it was estimated to weigh about 272 kg (600 lb). A male tiger shot in Nepal weighed 320 kg (710 lb) and measured 328 cm (10 ft 9 in) 'over the curves'. The heaviest wild Bengal tiger was possibly a male killed in 1967 in the foothills of the Himalayas that measured 323 cm (127 in) between pegs and 338 cm (133 in) over curves; it weighed 388.7 kg (857 lb) after eating a buffalo calf. It rivals the Siberian tiger in average weight.

The greatest skull length of a tiger is 351 mm (13.8 in) in males and 293 mm (11.5 in) in females. It has exceptionally stout teeth. Its canines are 7.5 to 10 cm (3.0 to 3.9 in) long and thus the longest among all cats.

== Distribution and habitat ==
The Bengal tiger's historical range covered the Indus River valley until the early 19th century, almost all of India, eastern Pakistan, southern Nepal, Bangladesh, Bhutan, and southwestern China. The modern tiger inhabits India, Bangladesh, Nepal, Bhutan, and southwestern China. It is estimated to have been present in the Indian subcontinent since the Late Pleistocene, for about 12,000 to 16,500 years. In 1982, a sub-fossil right middle phalanx was found in a prehistoric midden near Kuruwita in Sri Lanka, which is dated to about 16,500 years ago and tentatively considered to be of a tiger. Tigers appear to have arrived in Sri Lanka during a pluvial period, during which sea levels were depressed, evidently prior to the last glacial maximum about 20,000 years ago. The tiger probably arrived too late in southern India to colonise Sri Lanka, which earlier had been connected to India by a land bridge. Results of a phylogeographic study using 134 samples from tigers across the global range suggest that the historical northeastern distribution limit of the Bengal tiger is the region in the Chittagong Hills and Brahmaputra River basin, bordering the historical range of the Indochinese tiger. In the Indian subcontinent, Bengal tigers inhabit tropical moist evergreen forests, tropical dry forests, tropical and subtropical moist deciduous forests, mangroves, subtropical and temperate upland forests, and alluvial grasslands. The latter habitat once covered a huge swath of grassland, riverine and moist semi-deciduous forests along the major river system of the Gangetic and Brahmaputra plains, but has now been largely converted to agricultural land or severely degraded. The best examples of this habitat type are limited to a few blocks at the base of the outer foothills of the Himalayas including the Tiger Conservation Units (TCUs) Rajaji-Corbett-Pilibhit, Bardia-Banke, and the transboundary TCUs Chitwan-Parsa-Valmiki, Dudhwa-Kailali and Shuklaphanta-Kishanpur. Tiger densities in these TCUs are high, in part because of the extraordinary biomass of ungulate prey.

In Pakistan, Khairpur was the last stronghold of the tiger by the late 19th century; the last individuals were shot in 1906 in Bahawalpur in the Indus Riverine jungles.

=== India ===
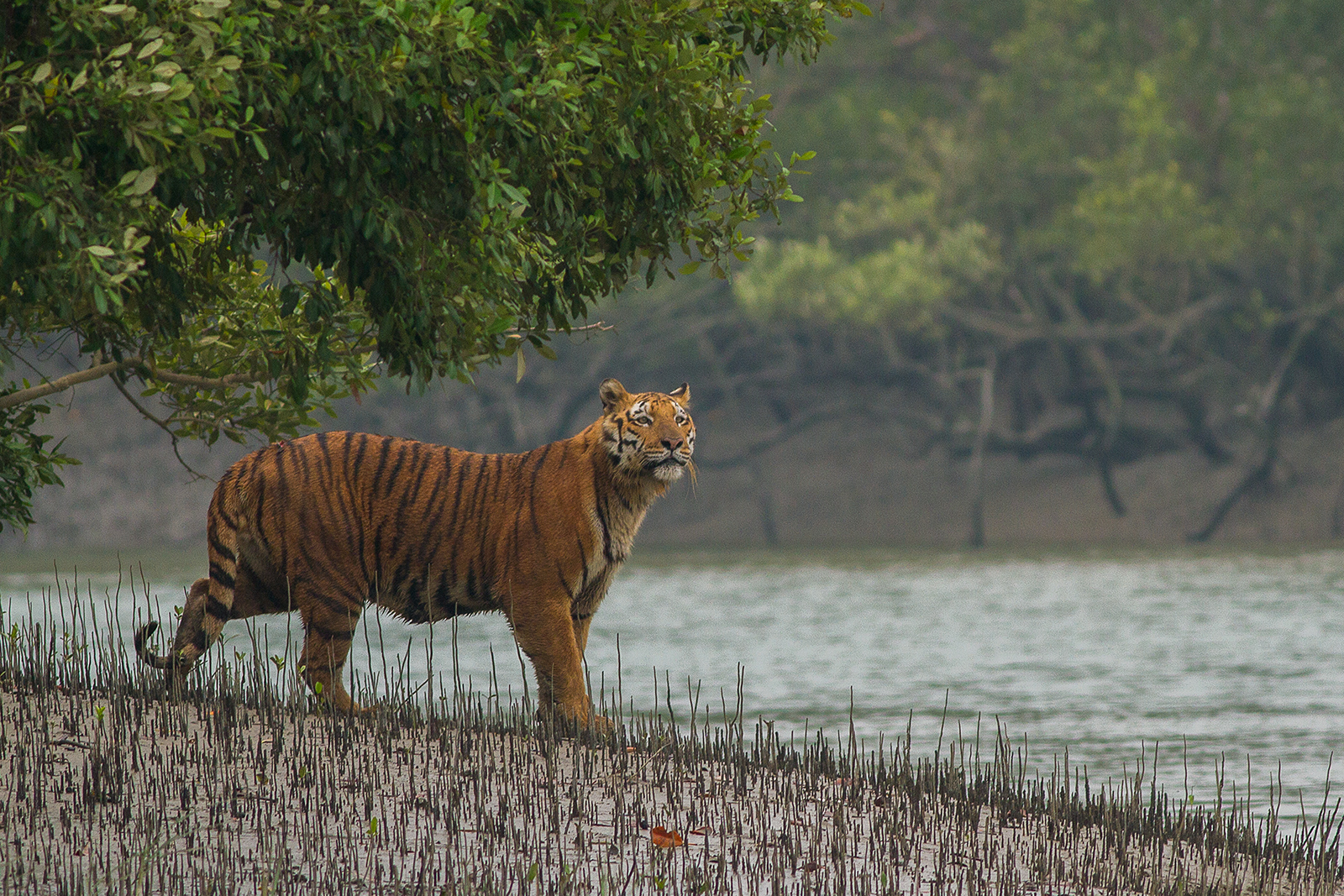
A tiger in Sundarban National Park

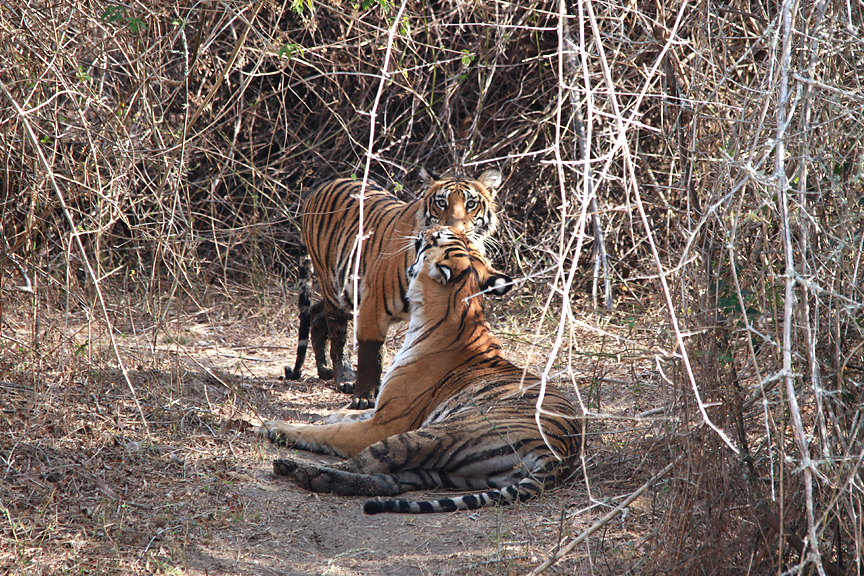
A tigress with her cub in Bandipur National Park

In the 20th century, Indian censuses of wild tigers relied on the individual identification of footprints known as pug marks – a method that has been criticised as deficient and inaccurate. Camera traps are now being used in many sites.

Good tiger habitats in subtropical and temperate forests include the Tiger Conservation Units (TCUs) Manas-Namdapha. TCUs in tropical dry forest include Hazaribag Wildlife Sanctuary, Nagarjunsagar-Srisailam Tiger Reserve, Kanha-Indravati corridor, Orissa dry forests, Panna National Park, Melghat Tiger Reserve and Ratapani Tiger Reserve. The TCUs in tropical moist deciduous forest are probably some of the most productive habitats for tigers and their prey, and include Kaziranga-Meghalaya, Kanha-Pench, Simlipal and Indravati Tiger Reserves. The TCUs in tropical moist evergreen forests represent the less common tiger habitats, being largely limited to the upland areas and wetter parts of the Western Ghats, and include the tiger reserves of Periyar, Kalakad-Mundathurai, Bandipur and Parambikulam Wildlife Sanctuary.

During a tiger census in 2008, camera trap and sign surveys using GIS were employed to estimate site-specific densities of tiger, co-predators and prey. Based on the result of these surveys, the total tiger population was estimated at 1,411 individuals ranging from 1,165 to 1,657 adult and sub-adult tigers of more than 1.5 years of age. Across India, six landscape complexes were surveyed that host tigers and have the potential to be connected. These landscapes comprise the following:

- in the Sivaliks–Gangetic flood plain landscape there are six populations with an estimated population size of 259 to 335 individuals in an area of 5,080 km^{2} (1,960 sq mi) of forested habitats, which are located in Rajaji and Corbett National Parks, in the connected habitats of Dudhwa-Kheri-Pilibhit, in Suhelwa Tiger Reserve, in Sohagi Barwa Sanctuary and in Valmiki National Park;
- in the Central Indian highlands there are 17 populations with an estimated population size of 437 to 661 individuals in an area of 48,610 km^{2} (18,770 sq mi) of forested habitats, which are located in the landscapes of Kanha-Pench, Satpura-Melghat, Sanjay-Palamau, Navegaon-Indravati; isolated populations are supported in the tiger reserves of Bandhavgarh, Tadoba, Simlipal and the national parks of Panna, Ranthambore–Kuno–Palpur–Madhav and Saranda;
- in the Eastern Ghats landscape there is a single population with an estimated population size of 49 to 57 individuals in a 7,772 km^{2} (3,001 sq mi) habitat in three separate forest blocks located in the Srivenkateshwara National Park, Nagarjunasagar Tiger Reserve and the adjacent proposed Gundla Brahmeshwara National Park, and forest patches in the tehsils of Kanigiri, Badvel, Udayagiri and Giddalur;
- in the Western Ghats landscape there are seven populations with an estimated population size of 336 to 487 individuals in a forested area of 21,435 km^{2} (8,276 sq mi) in three major landscape units Periyar-Kalakad-Mundathurai, Bandipur-Parambikulam-Sathyamangalam-Mudumalai-Anamalai-Mukurthi and Anshi-Kudremukh-Dandeli;
- in the Brahmaputra flood plains and northeastern hills tigers live in an area of 4,230 km^{2} (1,630 sq mi) in several patchy and fragmented forests;
- in the Sundarbans National Park tigers live in about 1,586 km^{2} (612 sq mi) of mangrove forest.

Manas-Namdapha, Orang-Laokhowa and Kaziranga-Meghalaya are Tiger Conservation Units in northeastern India, stretching over at least 14,500 km^{2} (5,600 sq mi) across several protected areas. Tigers are also present in Pakke Tiger Reserve. In the Mishmi Hills, tigers were recorded in 2017 up to an elevation of 3,630 m (11,910 ft) in snow. Ranthambore National Park hosts India's westernmost tiger population. The Dangs' Forest in southeastern Gujarat is potential tiger habitat.

In May 2018, a tiger was recorded in Sahyadri Tiger Reserve for the first time in eight years. In February 2019, a tiger was sighted in Gujarat's Lunavada area in Mahisagar district, and found dead shortly afterwards. Officials assumed that it originated in Ratapani Tiger Reserve and travelled about 300 km (190 mi) over two years. It probably died of starvation. In May 2019, camera traps recorded tigers in Mhadei Wildlife Sanctuary and Bhagwan Mahaveer Sanctuary and Mollem National Park, the first records in Goa since 2013.

The tigers in the Sundarbans in India and Bangladesh are the only ones in the world inhabiting mangrove forests. The population in the Indian Sundarbans was estimated as 86–90 individuals in 2018.

As of 2014, the Indian tiger population was estimated to range over an area of 89,164 km^{2} (34,426 sq mi) and number 2,226 adult and subadult tigers older than one year. About 585 tigers were present in the Western Ghats, where Radhanagari and Sahyadri Tiger Reserves were newly established. The largest population resided in Corbett Tiger Reserve with about 215 tigers. The Central Indian tiger population is fragmented and depends on wildlife corridors that facilitate connectivity between protected areas. By 2018, the population had increased to an estimated 2,603–3,346 individuals. As of 2022, the Indian population was estimated to comprise 3,167–3,682 individuals.

=== Bangladesh ===
In Bangladesh, tigers are relegated to the forests of the Sundarbans and the Chittagong Hill Tracts. The Chittagong forest is contiguous with tiger habitat in India and Myanmar, but the tiger population is of unknown status.

As of 2004, population estimates in Bangladesh ranged from 200 to 419 individuals, most of them in the Sundarbans. This region is the only mangrove habitat in this bioregion, where tigers survive, swimming between islands in the delta to hunt prey. Bangladesh's Forest Department is raising mangrove plantations supplying forage for spotted deer. Since 2001, afforestation has continued on a small scale in the Sundarbans. From October 2005 to January 2007, the first camera trap survey was conducted across six sites in the Bangladesh Sundarbans to estimate tiger population density. The average of these six sites provided an estimate of 3.7 tigers per 100 km^{2} (39 sq mi). Since the Bangladesh Sundarbans is an area of 5,770 km^{2} (2,230 sq mi), it was inferred that the total tiger population comprised approximately 200 individuals. Home ranges of adult female tigers were recorded comprising between 12 and 14 km^{2} (4.6 and 5.4 sq mi), which would indicate an approximate carrying capacity of 150 adult females. The small home range of adult female tigers and consequent high density of tigers in this habitat type relative to other areas may be related to both the high density of prey and the small size of the Sundarban tigers.

Since 2007, tiger monitoring surveys have been carried out every year by WildTeam in the Bangladesh Sundarbans to monitor changes in the Bangladesh tiger population and assess the effectiveness of conservation actions. This survey measures changes in the frequency of tiger track sets along the sides of tidal waterways as an index of relative tiger abundance across the Sundarbans landscape. By 2009, the tiger population in the Bangladesh Sundarbans was estimated as 100–150 adult females or 335–500 tigers overall. Female home ranges, recorded using Global Positioning System collars, were some of the smallest recorded for tigers, indicating that the Bangladesh Sundarbans could have one of the highest densities and largest populations of tigers anywhere in the world. They are isolated from the next tiger population by a distance of up to 300 km (190 mi). Information is lacking on many aspects of Sundarbans tiger ecology, including relative abundance, population status, spatial dynamics, habitat selection, life history characteristics, taxonomy, genetics, and disease. There is also no monitoring program in place to track changes in the tiger population over time, and therefore no way of measuring the response of the population to conservation activities or threats. Most studies have focused on the tiger-human conflict in the area, but two studies in the Sundarbans East Wildlife sanctuary documented habitat-use patterns of tigers, and abundances of tiger prey, and another study investigated tiger parasite load. Some major threats to tigers have been identified. The tigers living in the Sundarbans are threatened by habitat destruction, prey depletion, highly aggressive and rampant intraspecific competition, tiger-human conflict, and direct tiger loss. By 2017, this population was estimated at 84–158 individuals. As of 2018, 114 individuals were estimated to live in the country.

A rising sea-level due to climate change is projected to cause a severe loss of suitable habitat for this population in the following decades, around 50% by 2050 and 100% by 2070.

=== Nepal ===
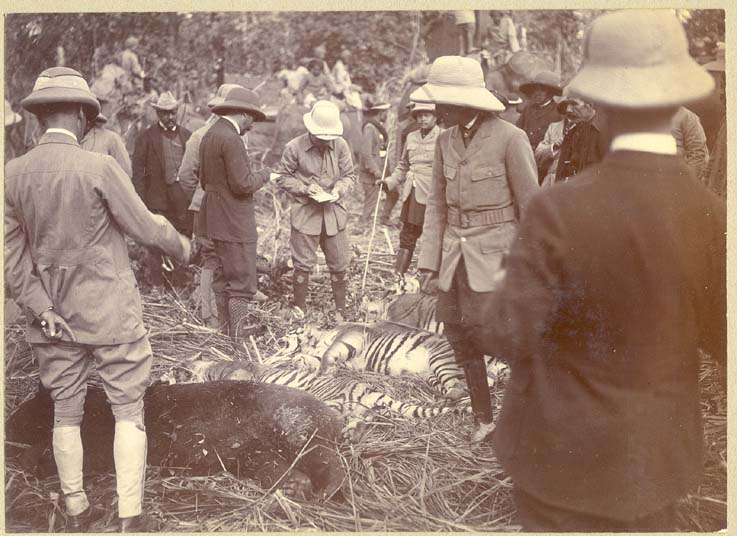
Tigers killed by King George V in Nepal in 1911

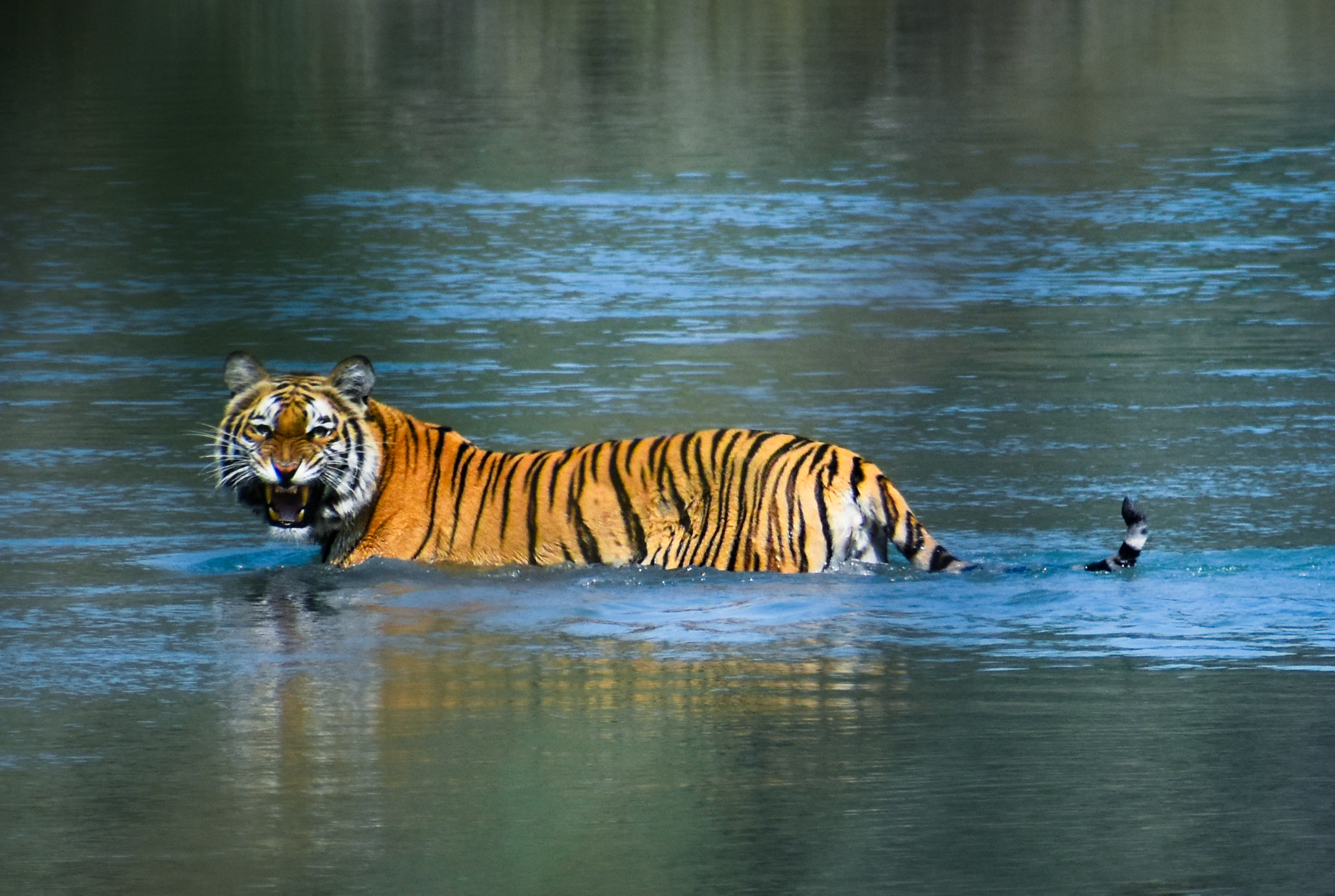
Bengal tiger in Bardiya National Park

The tiger population in the Terai of Nepal is split into three isolated subpopulations that are separated by cultivation and densely settled habitat. The largest population lives in Chitwan National Park and in the adjacent Parsa National Park encompassing an area of 2,543 km^{2} (982 sq mi) of prime lowland forest. To the west, the Chitwan population is isolated from the one in Bardiya National Park and adjacent unprotected habitat farther west, extending to within 15 km (9.3 mi) of the Shuklaphanta Wildlife Reserve, which harbours the smallest population.

From February to June 2013, a camera trapping survey was carried out in the Terai Arc Landscape, across an area of 4,841 km^{2} (1,869 sq mi) in 14 districts. The country's tiger population was estimated at 163–235 breeding adults comprising 102–152 tigers in the Chitwan-Parsa protected areas, 48–62 in Bardiya-Banke National Parks and 13–21 in Shuklaphanta National Park. Between November 2017 and April 2018, the third nationwide survey for tiger and prey was conducted in the Terai Arc Landscape; the country's population was estimated at 220–274 tigers. As of 2022, 316–355 individuals were estimated to live in the country.

=== Bhutan ===
In Bhutan, tigers have been documented in 17 of 18 districts. They inhabit the subtropical Himalayan foothills at an elevation of 200 m (660 ft) in the south to over 3,000 m (9,800 ft) in the temperate forests in the north. Their stronghold appears to be the country's central belt between the Mo River in the west and the Kulong River in the east ranging in elevation from 2,000 to 3,500 m (6,600 to 11,500 ft). By 2015, Bhutan's tiger population was estimated at 103 individuals.

Royal Manas and Jigme Singye Wangchuck National Parks form the largest contiguous tiger conservation area in Bhutan representing subtropical to alpine habitat types. In 2010, camera traps recorded a tiger pair at elevations of 3,000 to 4,100 m (9,800 to 13,500 ft). As of 2015, the tiger population in Bhutan was estimated at 89 to 124 individuals in a survey area of 28,225 km^{2} (10,898 sq mi).

In 2008, a tiger was recorded at an elevation of 4,200 m (13,800 ft) in Jigme Dorji National Park, which is the highest elevation record of a tiger known to date. In 2017, a tiger was recorded for the time in Bumdeling Wildlife Sanctuary. It probably used a wildlife corridor to reach northeastern Bhutan.

Bhutan's tiger population was estimated at 90 individuals comprising 60 females and 30 males with a population density estimate of 0.19–0.31 tigers per 100 km^{2} (39 sq mi) by March 2015. As of 2022, the population was estimated at 131 individuals.

=== China ===
The presence of the Bengal tiger in southeastern Tibet Autonomous Region, China was investigated in 1995 when the loss of livestock was high in Mêdog County due to a large predator. Tiger paw prints were found on pastures around several villages. One tiger was shot in 1996, and about 4–5 tigers were reported by officials in the area by 1999. About 8–12 tigers were thought to remain in this area a decade later. A camera trapping and interview survey during 2013–2018 in nine potential sites in Mêdog County revealed that only 1–3 non-resident individuals might be entering the area south of the Yarlung Tsangpo river, but only during the dry season from October to March. In early 2019, a Bengal tiger was photographed twice at an elevation of 2,000 m (6,600 ft) in a broadleaved forest in Yarlung Tsangpo Grand Canyon National Nature Reserve.

== Ecology and behaviour ==
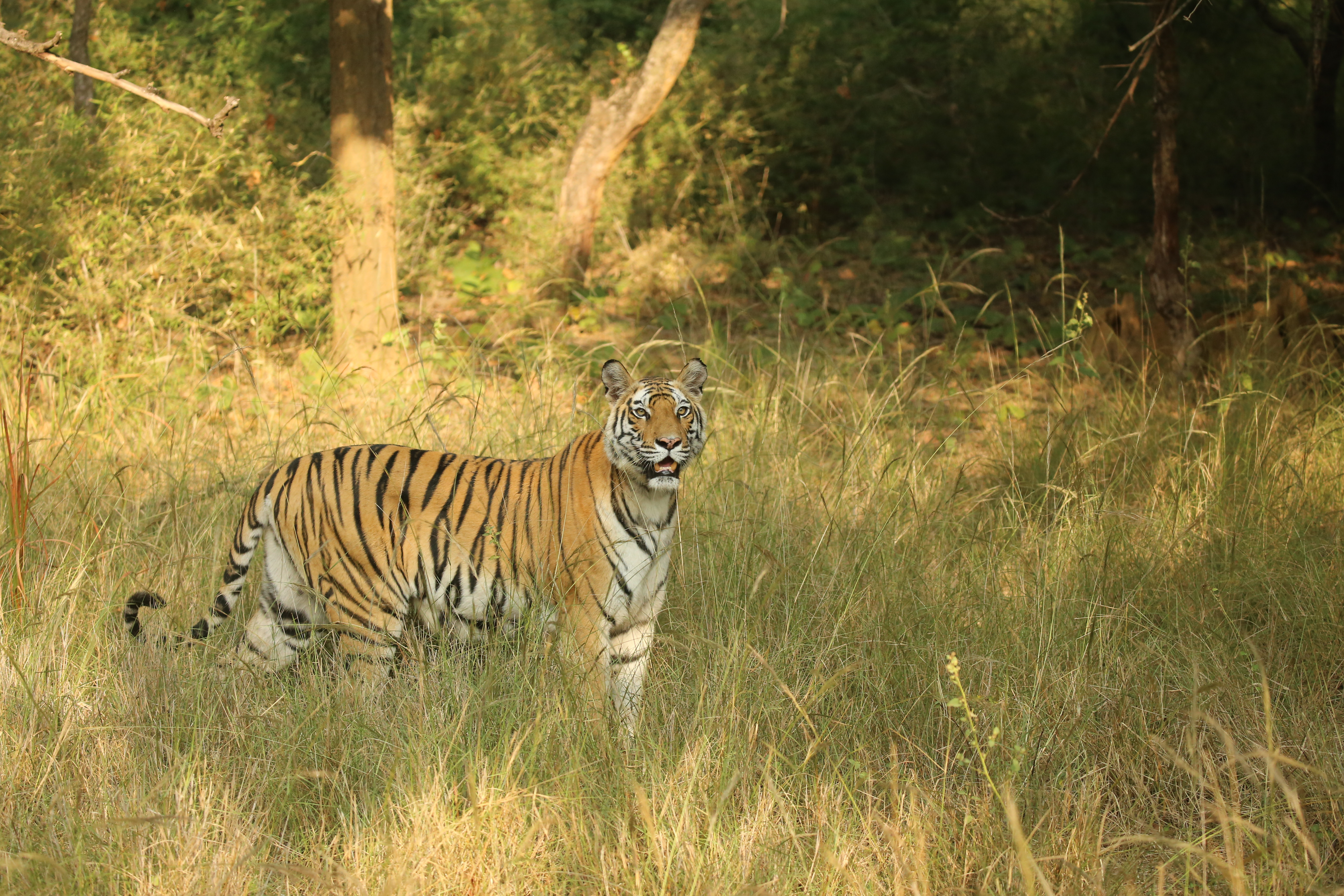
A tigress in Bandhavgarh National Park

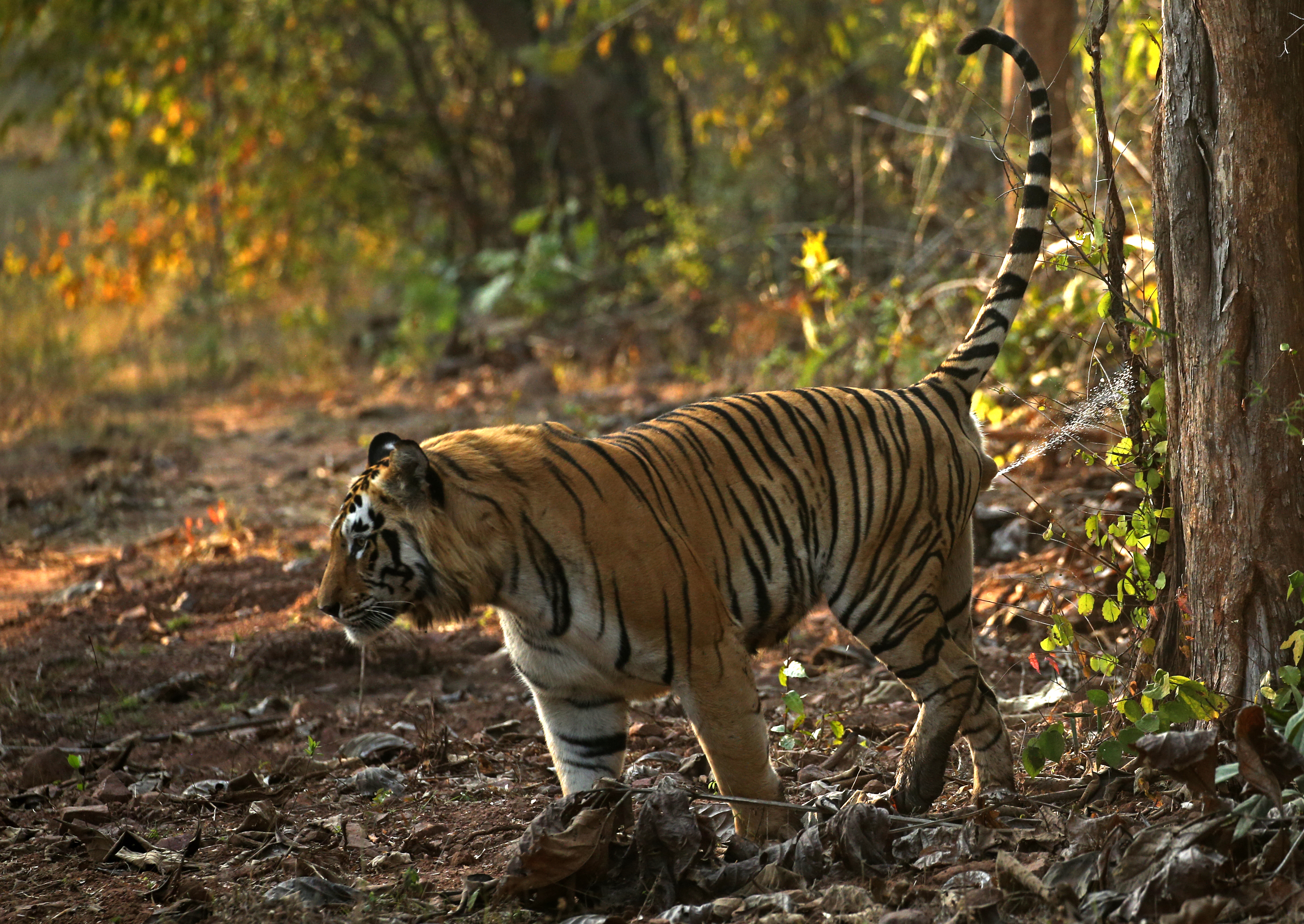
A tiger marking territory in Tadoba National Park

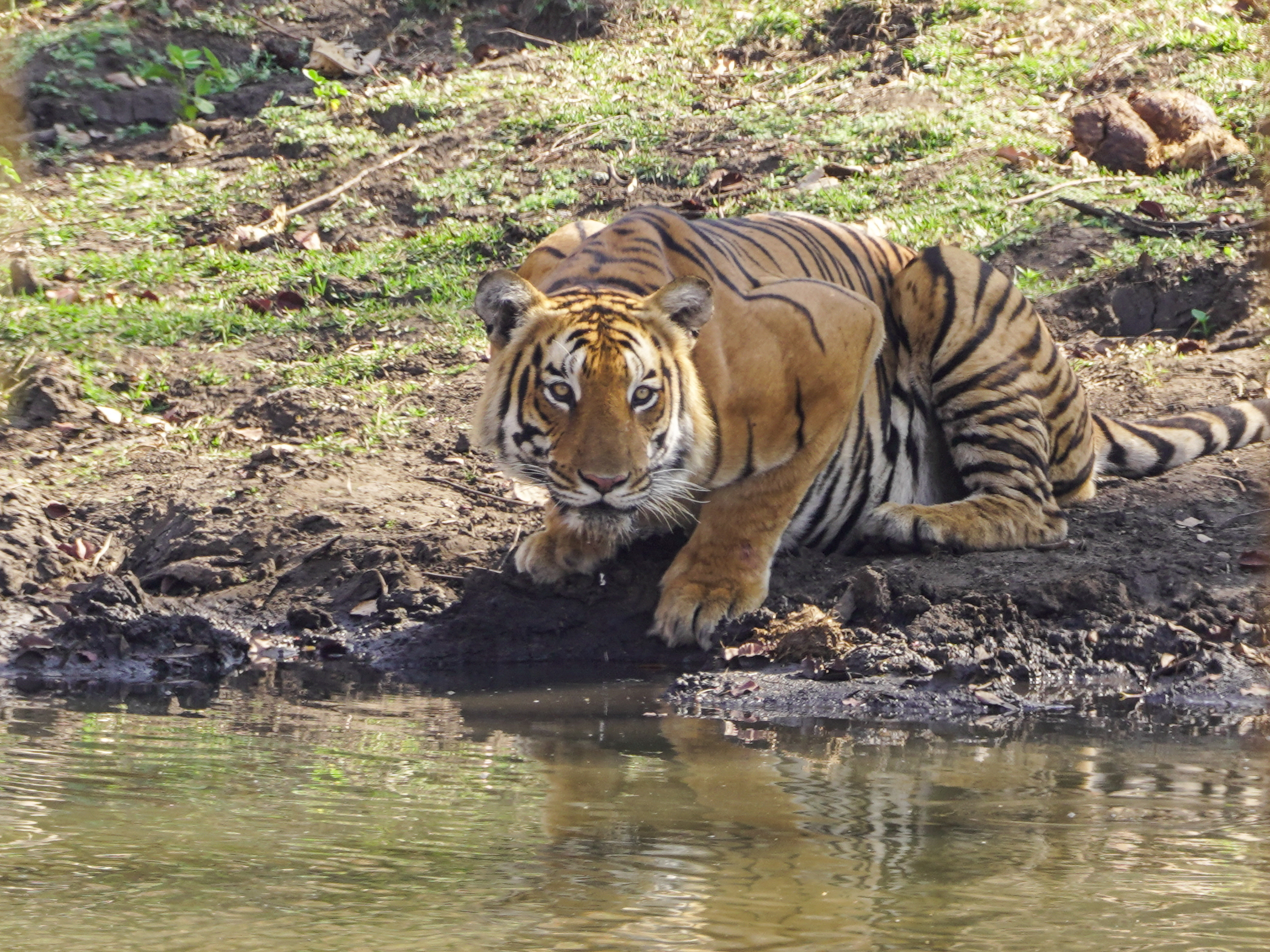
A tiger drinking from a pond in Mudumalai National Park

The basic social unit of the tiger is composed of a female and her offspring. Adult animals congregate only temporarily when special conditions permit, such as plentiful supplies of food. Otherwise, they lead solitary lives, hunting individually for the forest and grassland animals upon which they prey. Resident adults of either sex maintain home ranges, confining their movements to definite habitats within which they satisfy their needs and those of their cubs, which include prey, water and shelter. In this site, they also maintain contact with other tigers, especially those of the opposite sex. Those sharing the same ground are well aware of each other's movements and activities. In Chitwan National Park, radio-collared subadult tigers started dispersing from their natal areas earliest at the age of 19 months. Of the 14 subadults studied, the four females stayed closer to their mother's home range than the 10 males. The latter dispersed between 9.5 and 65.7 km (5.9 and 40.8 mi). None of them crossed open cultivated areas that were more than 10 km (6.2 mi) wide, but moved through prime alluvial and forested habitat.

In the Panna Tiger Reserve, an adult radio-collared male tiger moved 1.7 to 10.5 km (1.1 to 6.5 mi) between locations on successive days in winter, and 1 to 13.9 km (0.62 to 8.64 mi) in summer. His home range was about 200 km^{2} (77 sq mi) in summer and 110 km^{2} (42 sq mi) in winter. Included in his home range were the much smaller home ranges of two females, a tigress with cubs and a subadult tigress. They occupied home ranges of 16 to 31 km^{2} (6.2 to 12.0 sq mi).

The home ranges occupied by adult male residents tend to be mutually exclusive, even though one of these residents may tolerate a transient or sub-adult male at least for a time. A male tiger keeps a large territory in order to include the home ranges of several females within its bounds, so that he may maintain mating rights with them. Spacing among females is less complete. Typically there is partial overlap with neighbouring female residents. They tend to have core areas, which are more exclusive, at least for most of the time. Home ranges of both males and females are not stable. The shift or alteration of a home range by one animal is correlated with a shift of another. Shifts from less suitable habitat to better ones are made by animals that are already resident. New animals become residents only as vacancies occur when a former resident moves out or dies. There are more places for resident females than for resident males.

During seven years of camera trapping, tracking, and observational data in Chitwan National Park, six to nine breeding tigers, two to sixteen non-breeding tigers, and six to twenty young tigers of less than one year of age were detected in the study area of 100 km^{2} (39 sq mi). One of the resident females left her territory to one of her female offspring and took over an adjoining area by displacing another female; and a displaced female managed to re-establish herself in a neighbouring territory made vacant by the death of the resident. Of 11 resident females, 7 were still alive at the end of the study period, two disappeared after losing their territories to rivals, and two died. The initial loss of two resident males and subsequent take over of their home ranges by new males caused social instability for two years. Of four resident males, one was still alive and three were displaced by rivals. Five litters of cubs were killed by infanticide, two litters died because they were too young to fend for themselves when their mothers died. One juvenile tiger was presumed dead after being photographed with severe injuries from a deer snare. The remaining young lived long enough to reach dispersal age, two of them becoming residents in the study area.

=== Hunting and diet ===
The Bengal tiger is a carnivore and prefers hunting large ungulates such as gaur, sambar, chital, barasingha, water buffalo, nilgai, serow and takin. Medium-sized prey includes wild boar, Indian hog deer, Indian muntjac and northern plains gray langur. Small prey such as porcupine, hare and peafowl form a small part of its diet. Because of the encroachment of humans into tiger habitat, it also preys on domestic livestock.

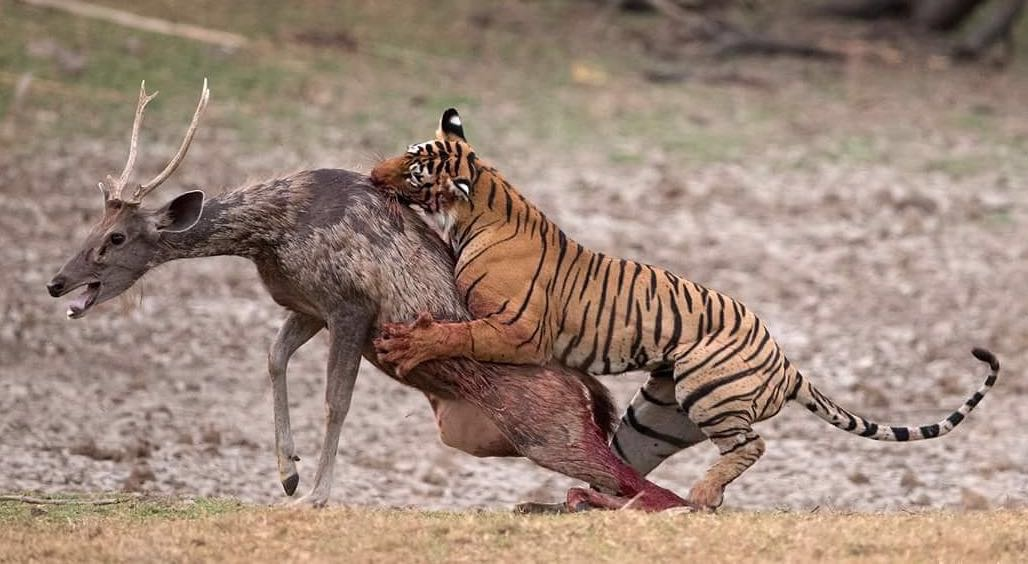
A tiger attacking a Sambar deer in Ranthambore National Park

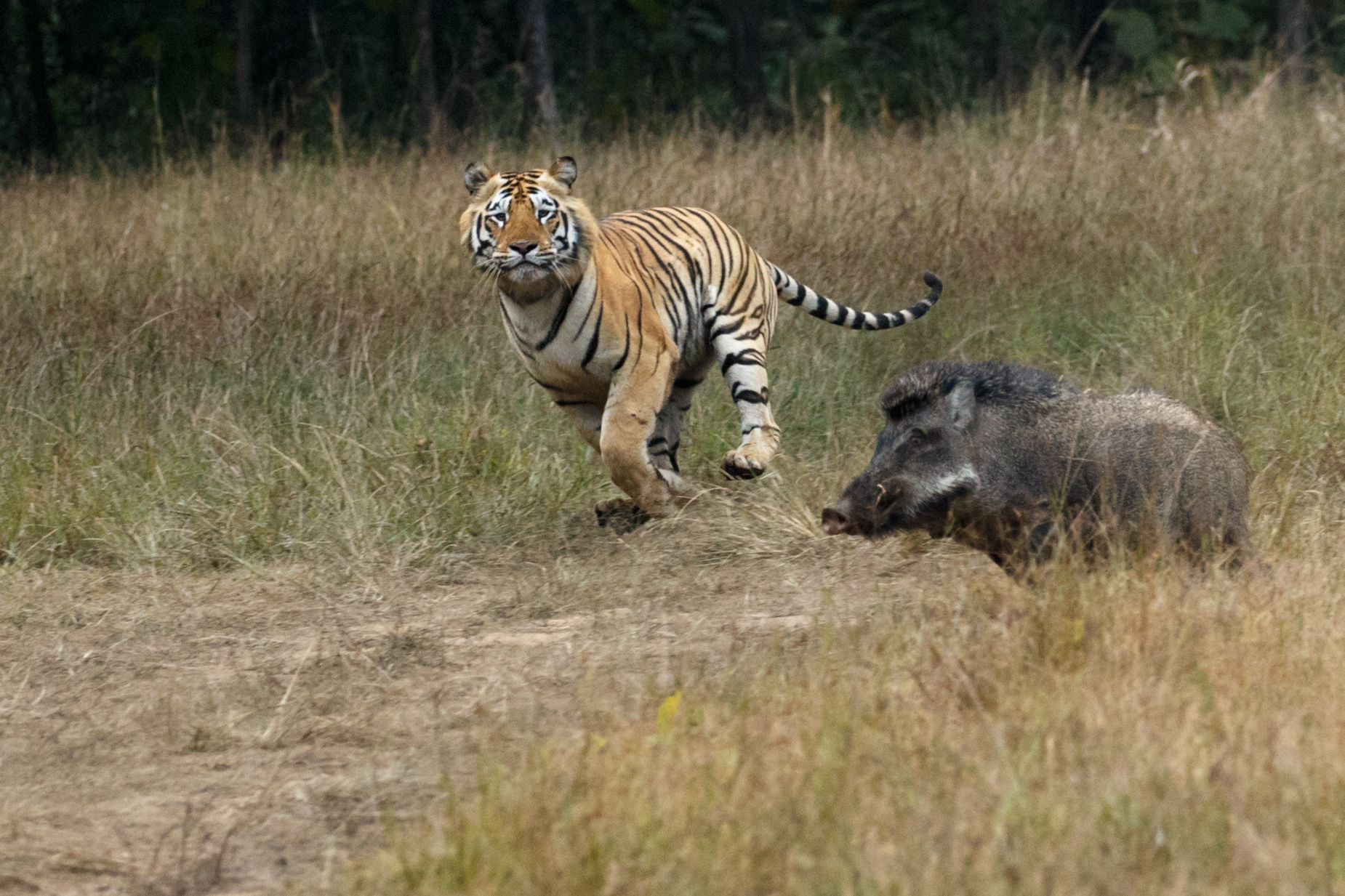
Tiger chasing a wild boar in Tadoba Andhari Tiger Reserve

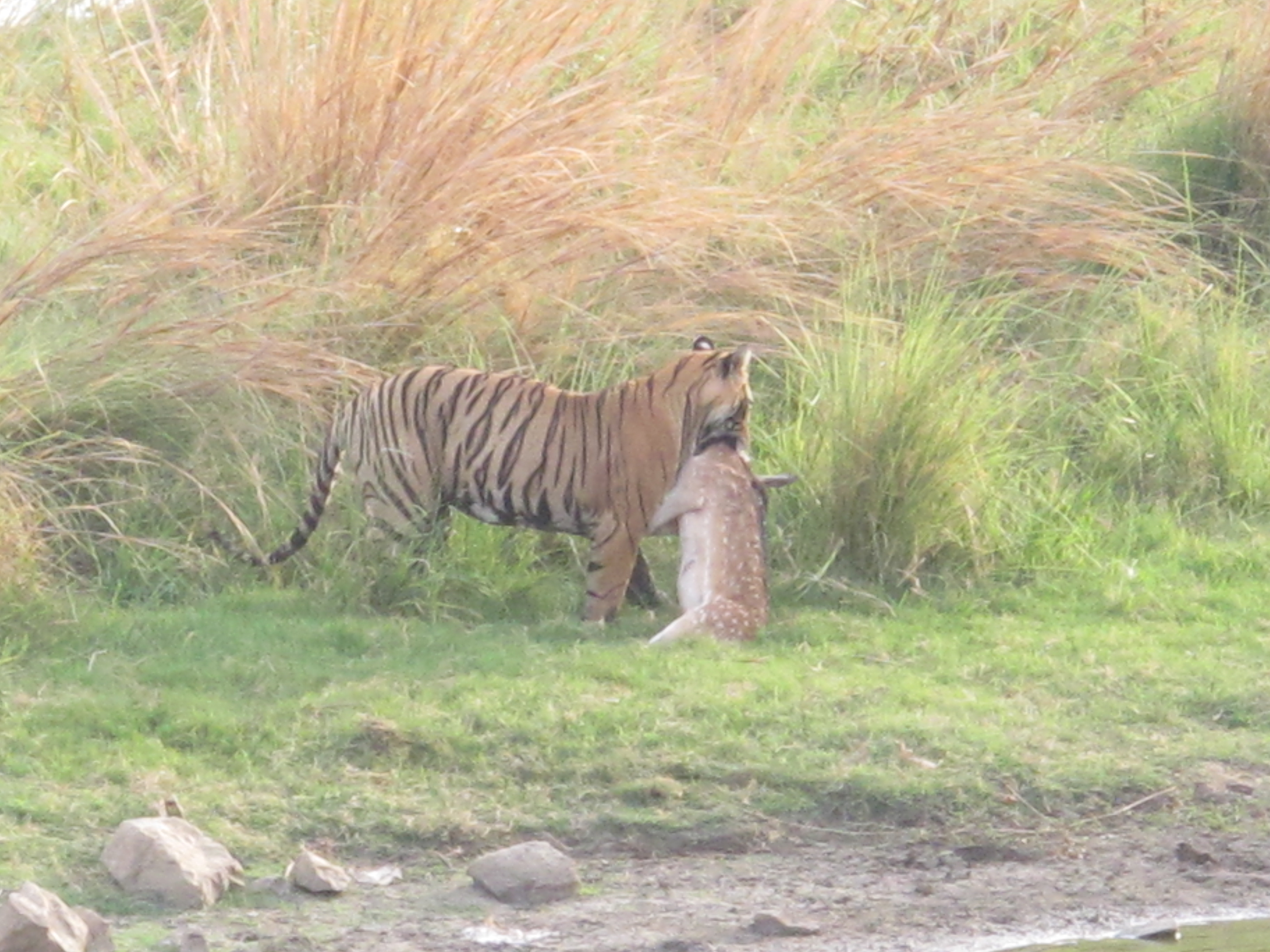
Tiger with kill in Ranthambore National Park

Bengal tigers occasionally hunt and kill predators such as Indian leopard, mugger crocodile, Asian black bear, sloth bear, and dhole. They generally do not attack adult Indian elephant and Indian rhinoceros, but such extraordinarily rare events have been recorded. In Kaziranga National Park, tigers killed 20 rhinoceros in 2007. In 2011 and 2014, two instances of Bengal tigers killing adult elephants were recorded; in Jim Corbett National Park on a 20-year-old elephant cow, and another on a 28-year-old sick elephant in Kaziranga National Park; the latter was eaten by several tigers at once. A king cobra (Ophiophagus hannah), an Indian cobra (Naja naja), Asian water monitor, rhesus macaque, fish, crabs, and very rarely fishing cats and turtles were found in the stomachs and scat of tigers in the Sundarbans. One in Chitwan National Park has been reported to have hunted three gharials.

Results of scat analyses indicate that the Bengal tigers in Nagarahole National Park preferred prey weighing more than 176 kg (388 lb) and that on average tiger prey weighed 91.5 kg (202 lb). The prey species included chital, sambar, wild pig and gaur. Gaur remains were found in 44.8% of all tiger scat samples, sambar remains in 28.6%, wild pig remains in 14.3% and chital remains in 10.4% of all scat samples. In Bandipur National Park, gaur and sambar together also constituted 73% of tiger diet.

In most cases, Bengal tigers approach their victim from the side or behind from as close a distance as possible and grasp the prey's throat to kill it. Then they drag the carcass into cover, occasionally over several hundred metres, to consume it. The nature of the tiger's hunting method and prey availability results in a "feast or famine" feeding style: they often consume 18–40 kg (40–88 lb) of meat at one time. In one study, tigresses from Nepal made about 40–50 kills a year and ate a minimum of 5–6.3 kg (11–14 lb) of meat a day. Two males made about 40–50 kills in a year and ate 6.3–7.8 kg (14–17 lb) of meat a day at the least.

If injured, old or weak, or when its regular prey species become scarce, Bengal tigers often attack humans and become man-eaters.

=== Reproduction and lifecycle ===
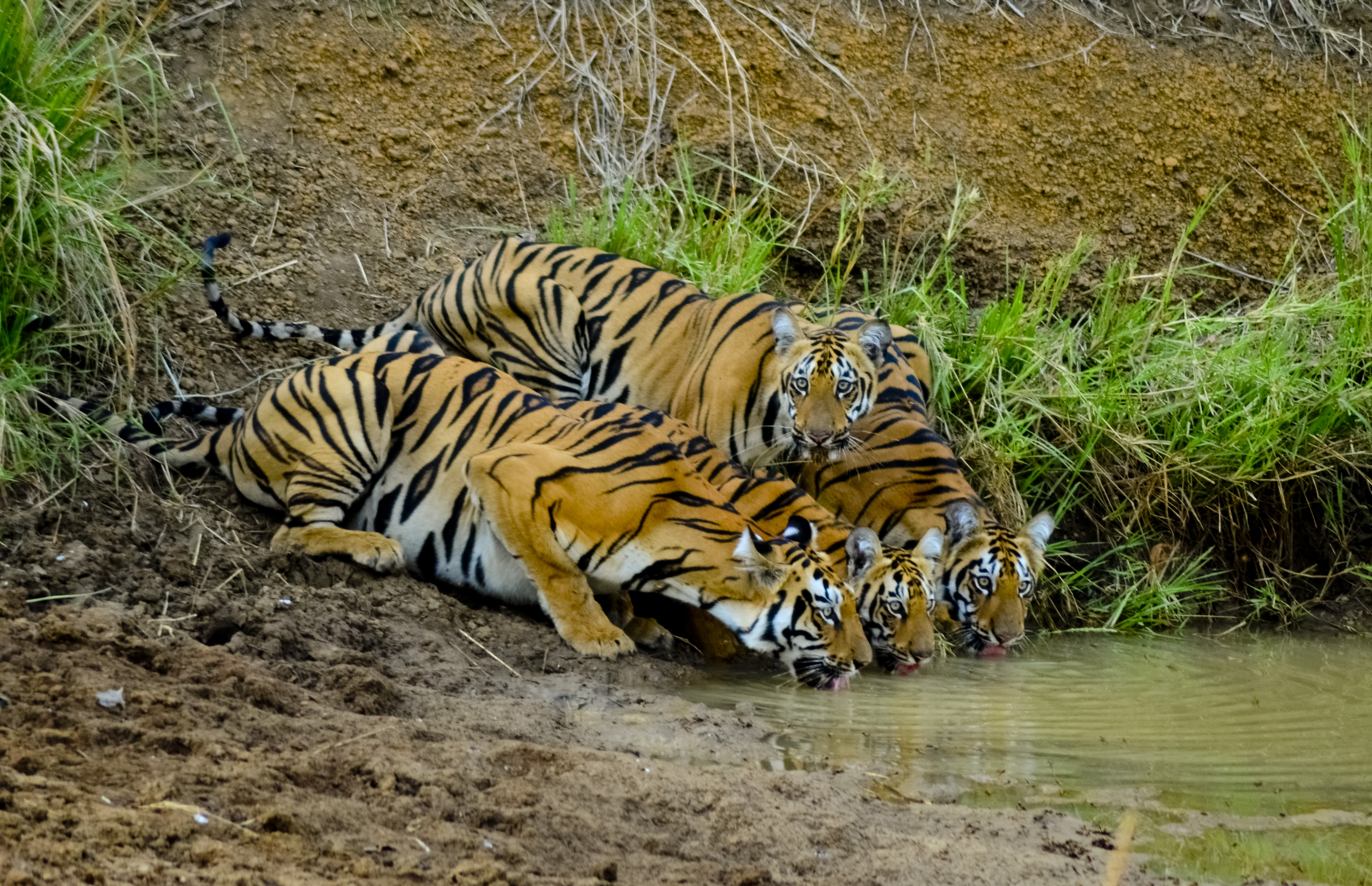
A tigress with her cubs in Tadoba Andhari Tiger Reserve

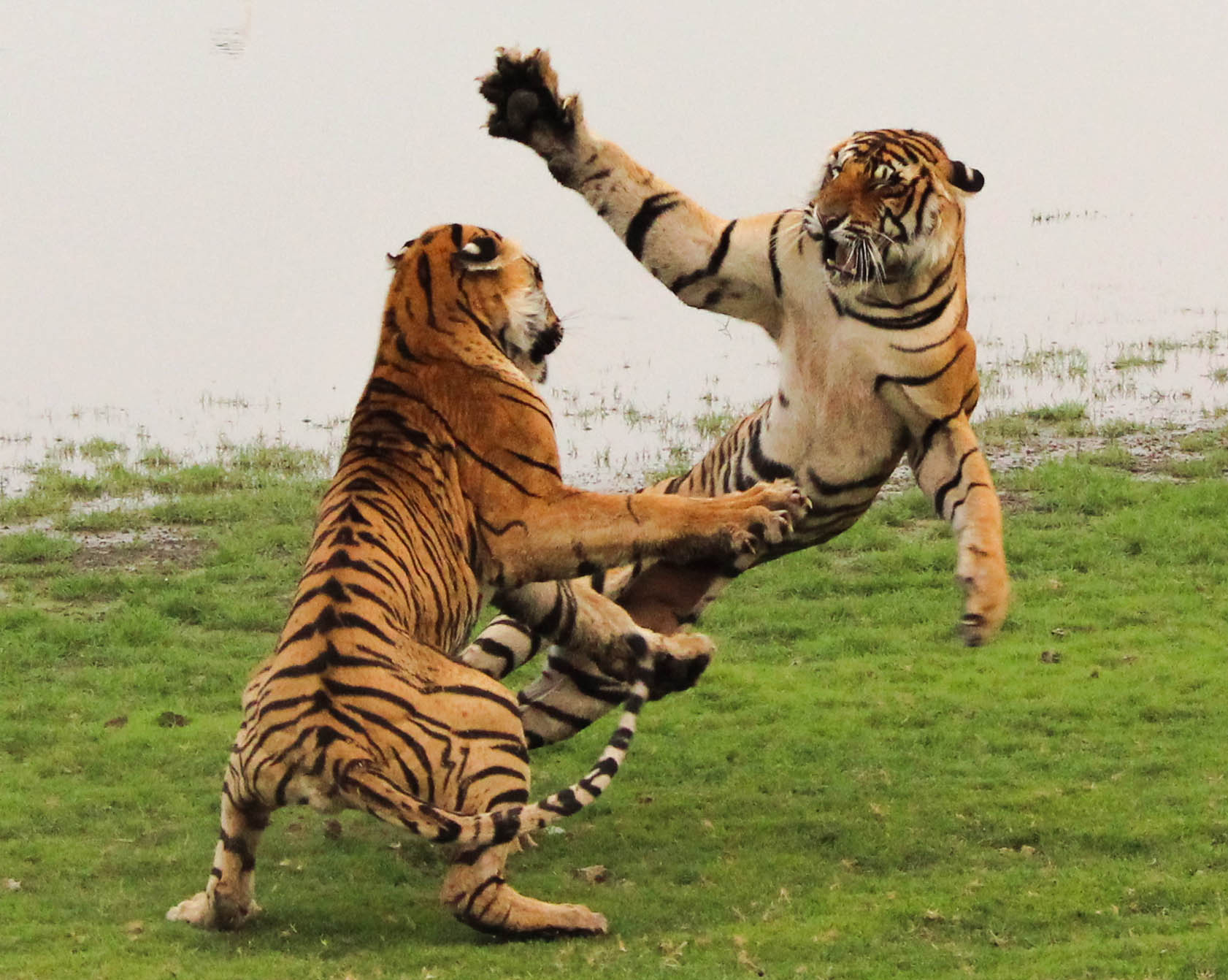
Female cubs playing in Ranthambore Tiger Reserve

The tiger in India has no definite mating and birth seasons. Most young are born in December and April. Young have also been observed in March, May, October and November. In the 1960s, certain aspects of tiger behaviour at Kanha National Park indicated that the peak of sexual activity was from November to about February, with some mating probably occurring throughout the year.

Males reach maturity at 4–5 years of age, and females at 3–4 years. The female comes into estrus at intervals of about 3–9 weeks, and is receptive for 3–6 days. After a gestation period of 104–106 days, 1–4 cubs are born in a shelter situated in tall grass, thick bush or in caves. Newborn cubs weigh 780 to 1,600 g (28 to 56 oz) and they have a thick woolly fur that is shed after 3.5–5 months. Their eyes and ears are closed. Their milk teeth start to erupt at about 2–3 weeks after birth, and are slowly replaced by permanent dentition from 8.5 to 9.5 weeks of age onwards. They suckle for 3–6 months, and begin to eat small amounts of solid food at about 2 months of age. At this time, they follow their mother on her hunting expeditions and begin to take part in hunting at 5–6 months of age. At the age of 2–3 years, they slowly start to separate from the family group and become transient, looking out for an area where they can establish their own home range. Young males move farther away from their native home range than young females. Once the family group has split, the mother comes into heat again.

== Threats ==
None of the Tiger Conservation Landscapes within the Bengal tiger range is large enough to support an effective population size of 250 individuals. Habitat losses and the extremely large-scale incidences of poaching are serious threats to the species' survival.

The Forest Rights Act passed by the Indian government in 2006 grants some of India's most impoverished communities the right to own and live in the forests, which likely brings them into conflict with wildlife and under-resourced, under-trained, ill-equipped forest department staff. In the past, evidence showed that humans and tigers cannot co-exist.

=== Poaching ===
The most significant immediate threat to the existence of wild tiger populations is the illegal wildlife trade in poached skins and body parts between India, Nepal and China. The governments of these countries have failed to implement adequate enforcement response, and wildlife crime remained a low priority in terms of political commitment and investment for years. There are well-organised gangs of professional poachers, who move from place to place and set up camp in vulnerable areas. Skins are rough-cured in the field and handed over to dealers, who send them for further treatment to Indian tanning centres. Buyers choose the skins from dealers or tanneries and smuggle them through a complex interlinking network to markets outside India, mainly in China. Other factors contributing to their loss are urbanisation and revenge killing. Farmers blame tigers for killing cattle and shoot them. Their skins and body parts may however become a part of the illegal trade. In Bangladesh, tigers are killed by professional poachers, local hunters, trappers and villagers. Each group of people has different motives for killing tigers, ranging from profit and excitement to safety concerns; and has access to the illegal wildlife trade in body parts.

The illicit demand for bones and body parts from wild tigers for use in Traditional Chinese medicine is the reason for the unrelenting poaching pressure on tigers on the Indian subcontinent. For at least a thousand years, tiger bones have been an ingredient in traditional medicines that are prescribed as a muscle strengthener and treatment for rheumatism and body pain.

Between 1994 and 2009, the Wildlife Protection Society of India has documented 893 cases of tigers killed in India, which is just a fraction of the actual poaching and trade in tiger parts during those years. In 2004, all the tigers in India's Sariska Tiger Reserve were killed by poachers. In 2007, police in Allahabad raided a meeting of suspected poachers, traders and couriers. One of the arrested persons was the biggest buyer of Indian tiger parts who sold them to Chinese buyers, using women from a nomadic tribe as couriers. In 2009, none of the 24 tigers residing in the Panna Tiger Reserve were left because of excessive poaching. In November 2011, two tigers were found dead in Maharashtra: a male tiger was trapped and killed in a wire snare; a tigress died of electrocution after chewing at an electric cable supplying power to a water pump; another dead tigress found in Kanha Tiger Reserve landscape was suspected to have been poisoned. In 2021, Bangladeshi police arrested a poacher suspected of killing 70 Bengal tigers during a period of 20 years.

Between January 2020 and June 2025, seizures in India, Nepal and Bangladesh comprised 332 tigers, including 313 tigers in India alone.

=== Human–tiger conflict ===
The Indian subcontinent has served as a stage for intense confrontations between tigers and people. At the beginning of the 19th century tigers were so numerous, that the killing of tigers was officially rewarded in many localities. The Terai region supported large numbers of tigers that were pushed into marginal habitat after the 1950s, when the conversion of natural habitat for paddy fields increased. Marauding tigers began to take a toll of human life in areas bordering cultivation. They are thought to have followed domestic livestock that wintered in the plains when they returned to the hills in the spring, and then being left without prey when the herds dispersed back to their respective villages. These tigers were the old, the young and the disabled. All suffered from some disability, mainly caused either by gunshot wounds or porcupine quills.

In the Sundarbans, 10 out of 13-man-eaters recorded in the 1970s were males, and they accounted for 86% of the victims. These man-eaters have been grouped into the confirmed or dedicated ones who go hunting especially for human prey; and the opportunistic ones, who do not search for humans but will, if they encounter a man, attack, kill and devour him. In areas where opportunistic man-eaters were found, the killing of humans was correlated with their availability, most victims being claimed during the honey-gathering season. Tigers in the Sunderbans presumably attacked humans who entered their territories in search of wood, honey or fish, thus causing them to defend their territories. The number of tiger attacks on humans may be higher outside suitable areas for tigers, where numerous people are present, but with little wild prey for tigers.

In Nepal, the incidence of man-eating tigers has been only sporadic. In Chitwan National Park no cases were recorded before 1980. In the following few years, 13 people have been killed and eaten in the park and its environs. In the majority of cases, man-eating appeared to have been related to an intra-specific competition among male tigers. An interview survey with 499 local people in Chitwan revealed that lower caste Hindus and people with less than eight years of formal education had negative attitudes to the tiger; most of them owned livestock and had heard about tigers attacking people and livestock.

In December 2012, a tiger was shot by the Kerala Forest Department on a coffee plantation on the fringes of the Wayanad Wildlife Sanctuary. Chief Wildlife Warden of Kerala ordered the hunt for the animal after mass protests erupted as the tiger had been carrying away livestock. The Forest Department had constituted a special task force to capture the animal with the assistance of a 10-member Special Tiger Protection Force and two trained Indian elephants from the Bandipur Tiger Reserve in Karnataka.

== Conservation efforts ==
An area of special interest lies in the "Terai Arc Landscape" in the Himalayan foothills of northern India and southern Nepal, where 11 protected areas composed of dry forest foothills and tall-grass savannas harbour tigers in a 49,000 square kilometres (19,000 mi^{2}) landscape. The goals are to manage tigers as a single metapopulation, the dispersal of which between core refuges can help maintain genetic, demographic, and ecological integrity, and to ensure that species and habitat conservation becomes mainstreamed into the rural development agenda. In Nepal a community-based tourism model has been developed with a strong emphasis on sharing benefits with local people and on the regeneration of degraded forests. The approach has been successful in reducing poaching, restoring habitats, and creating a local constituency for conservation.

The WWF partnered with Leonardo DiCaprio to form a global campaign, "Save Tigers Now", with the ambitious goal of building political, financial and public support to double the wild tiger population by 2022. Save Tigers Now started its campaign in 12 different WWF Tiger priority landscapes, since May 2010.

This population of tigers has been assessed at the local level in several countries. It is listed as Endangered in Nepal, India, and Bhutan, While Bangladesh and China list it as Critically Endangered.

In April 2023, India signed a memorandum of understanding with Cambodia to assist the country with the tiger's reintroduction. At least 90 acres (36 ha) of the Cardamom Mountains of Tatai Wildlife Sanctuary could be used to host tigers that are imported from India. The last tiger in Cambodia was photographed in 2007 by a camera trap. In 2016, the Cambodian government declared that the Indochinese tiger population was "functionally extinct".

=== In India ===
In 1973, Project Tiger was launched aiming at ensuring a viable tiger population in the country and preserving areas of biological importance as a natural heritage for the people. The project's task force visualised these tiger reserves as breeding nuclei, from which surplus animals would disperse to adjacent forests. The selection of areas for the reserves represented as close as possible the diversity of ecosystems across the tiger's distribution in the country. Funds and commitment were mustered to support the intensive program of habitat protection and rehabilitation under the project. By the late 1980s, the initial nine reserves covering an area of 9,115 square kilometres (3,519 sq mi) had been increased to 15 reserves covering an area of 24,700 square kilometres (9,500 sq mi). More than 1100 tigers were estimated to inhabit the reserves by 1984.

Through this initiative the population decline was reversed initially, but has resumed in recent years; India's tiger population decreased from 3,642 in the 1990s to just over 1,400 from 2002 to 2008.

The Indian Wildlife Protection Act of 1972 enables government agencies to take strict measures so as to ensure the conservation of the Bengal tigers. The Wildlife Institute of India estimates showed that tiger numbers had fallen in Madhya Pradesh by 61%, Maharashtra by 57%, and Rajasthan by 40%. The government's first tiger census, conducted under the Project Tiger initiative begun in 1973, counted 1,827 tigers in the country that year. Using that methodology, the government observed a steady population increase, reaching 3,700 tigers in 2002. However, the use of more reliable and independent censusing technology including camera traps for the 2007–2008 all-India census has shown that the numbers were in fact less than half than originally claimed by the Forest Department.

Following the revelation that only 1,411 Bengal tigers existed in the wild in India, down from 3,600 in 2003, the Indian government set up eight new tiger reserves. Because of dwindling tiger numbers, the Indian government has pledged US$153 million to further fund the Project Tiger initiative, set up a Tiger Protection Force to combat poachers, and fund the relocation of up to 200,000 villagers to minimise human-tiger interaction. Indian tiger scientists have called for use of technology in the conservation efforts. In 2022, Ranipur Wildlife Sanctuary was declared as the 54th tiger reserve.

In January 2008, the Government of India launched a dedicated anti-poaching force composed of experts from Indian police, forest officials and various other environmental agencies. Ranthambore National Park is often cited as a major success by Indian officials against poaching.

Kuno-Palpur in Madhya Pradesh was supposed to receive Asiatic lions from Gujarat. Since no lions have been transferred from Gujarat to Madhya Pradesh so far, it may be used as a sanctuary for the tiger instead where it could help keep down the leopard population that targets the main prey of reintroduced cheetahs.

=== In captivity ===
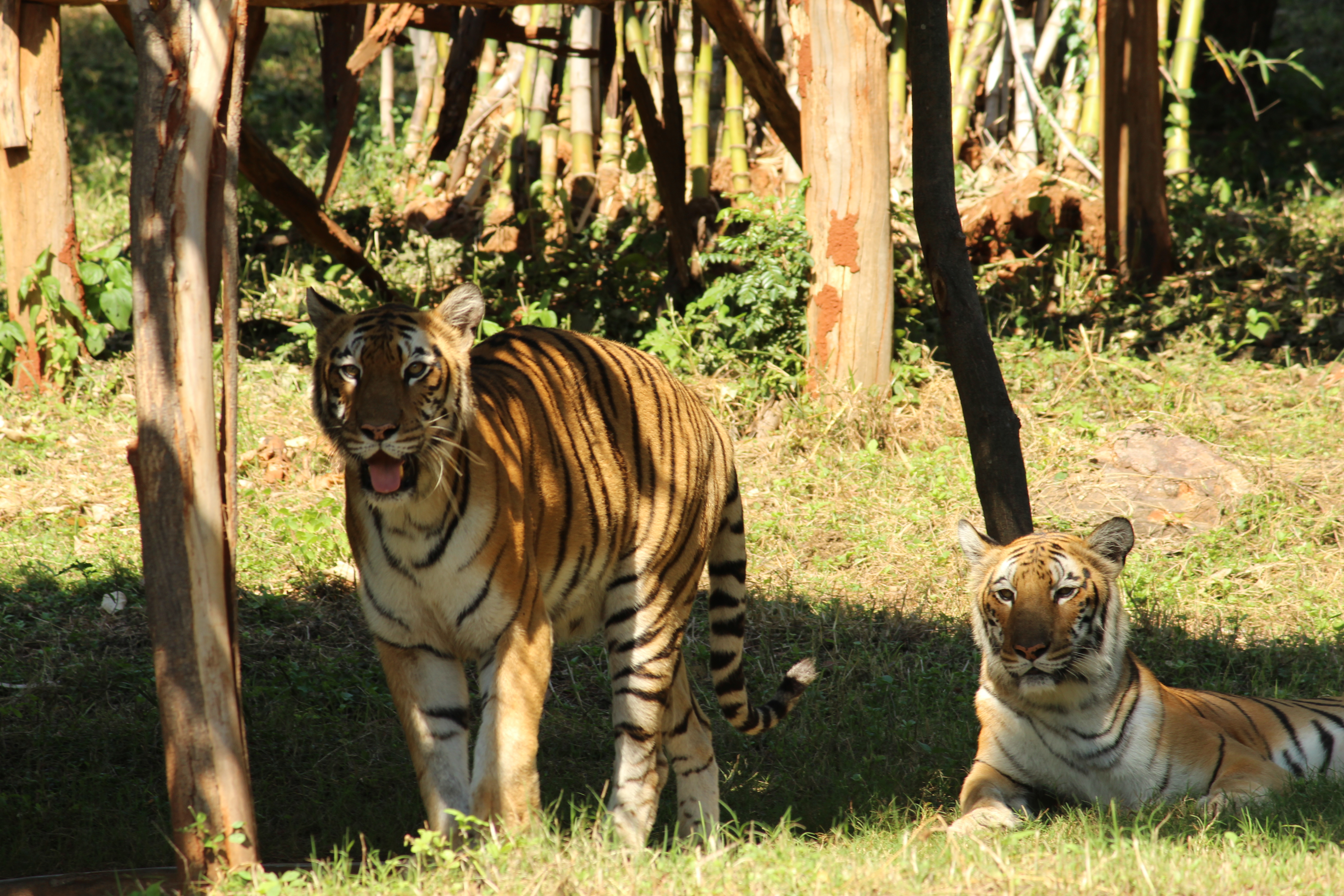
Captive tigers at Indira Gandhi Zoological Park

Bengal tigers have been captive bred since 1880 and widely crossed with tigers from other range countries.

In July 1976, Billy Arjan Singh acquired a hand-reared tigress from Twycross Zoo in the United Kingdom, and reintroduced her to the wild in Dudhwa National Park with the permission of India's then Prime Minister Indira Gandhi. In the 1990s, some tigers from this area were observed to have the typical appearance of Siberian tigers, namely a large head, pale fur, white complexion, and wide stripes, and were suspected to be Siberian–Bengal tiger hybrids. Tiger hair samples from the national park were analysed using mitochondrial sequence analysis. Results revealed that the tigers in question had a Bengal tiger mitochondrial haplotype indicating that their mother was a Bengal tiger. Skin, hair and blood samples from 71 tigers collected in Indian zoos, in the Indian Museum, Kolkata and including two samples from Dudhwa National Park were used for a microsatellite analysis that revealed that two tigers had alleles in two loci contributed by Bengal and Siberian tigers. However, samples of two hybrid specimens constituted a too small sample base to conclusively assume that Tara was the source of the Siberian tiger genes.

Indian zoos bred tigers for the first time at the Alipore Zoo in Kolkata. The 1997 International Tiger Studbook lists the global captive population of Bengal tigers at 210 individuals that are all kept in Indian zoos, except for one female in North America. Completion of the Indian Bengal Tiger Studbook is a necessary prerequisite to establishing a captive management program for tigers in India.

=== In Bangladesh ===
WildTeam is working with local communities and the Bangladesh Forest Department to reduce human-tiger conflict in the Bangladesh Sundarbans. For over 100 years people, tigers, and livestock have been injured and killed in the conflict; in recent decades up to 50 people, 80 livestock, and 3 tigers have been killed in a year. Now, through WildTeam's work, there is a boat-based Tiger Response team that provides first aid, transport, and body retrieval support for people being killed in the forest by tigers. WildTeam has also set up 49 volunteer Village Response Teams that are trained to save tigers that have strayed into the village areas and would be otherwise killed. These village teams are made up of over 350 volunteers, who are also now supporting anti-poaching work and conservation education/awareness activities. WildTeam also works to empower local communities to access the government funds for compensating the loss/injury of livestock and people from the conflict. To monitor the conflict and assess the effectiveness of actions, WildTeam have also set up a human-tiger conflict data collection and reporting system.

=== In Nepal ===
In May 2010, Banke National Park was established with an area of 550 km^{2} (210 sq mi). The government aimed at doubling the country's tiger population by 2022 at the Global Tiger Summit in 2010. The tiger population reached 355 in 2022, almost tripling the population of 121 in 2009.

=== "Re-wilding" project in South Africa ===
In 2000, the Bengal tiger re-wilding project Tiger Canyons was started by John Varty, who together with the zoologist Dave Salmoni trained captive-bred tiger cubs how to stalk, hunt, associate hunting with food and regain their predatory instincts. They claimed that once the tigers proved that they can sustain themselves in the wild, they would be released into a free-range sanctuary of South Africa to fend for themselves.

The project has received controversy after accusations by their investors and conservationists of manipulating the behaviour of the tigers for the purpose of a film production, Living with Tigers, with the tigers believed to be unable to hunt. Stuart Bray, who had originally invested a large sum of money in the project, claimed that he and his wife, Li Quan, watched the film crew "[chase] the prey up against the fence and into the path of the tigers just for the sake of dramatic footage."

The four tigers involved in this project have been confirmed to be crossbred Siberian–Bengal tigers, which should neither be used for breeding nor being released into the Karoo. Tigers that are not genetically pure will not be able to participate in the tiger Species Survival Plan, as they are not used for breeding, and are not allowed to be released into the wild.

== In culture ==
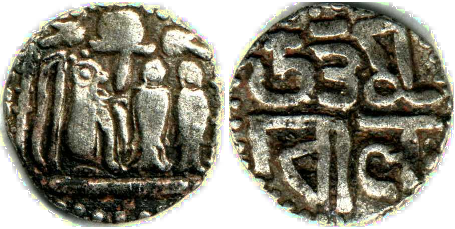
An early silver coin of Uththama Chola found in Sri Lanka showing the tiger emblem of the Cholas

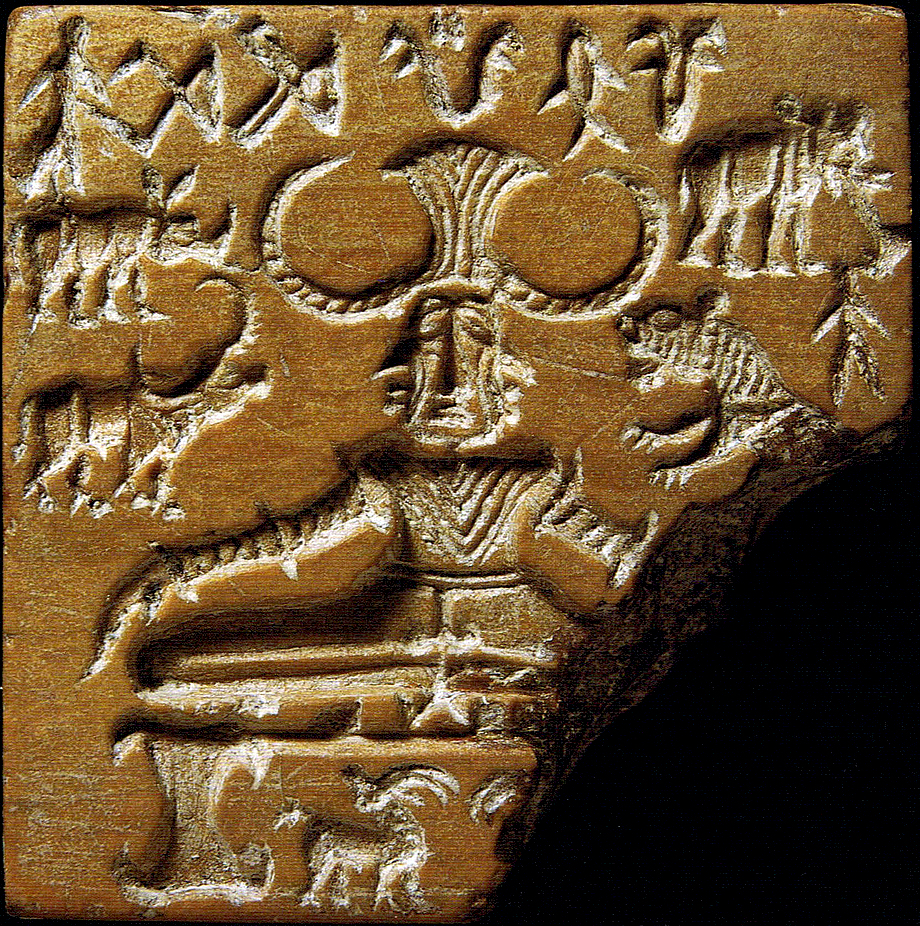
The Pashupati seal with tiger to right of the seated divine figure Pashupati

The tiger is one of the animals displayed on the Pashupati seal of the Indus Valley Civilisation. The tiger crest is the emblem on Chola coins. The presence on many coins of a tiger, a fish, and a bow suggests they are Chola issues. The latter two emblems are of the Pandya and Chera dynasties respectively, and Chola copper plate inscriptions showing the three together indicate that the Cholas had achieved political supremacy over them.

The tiger is the national animal of Bangladesh and India. Bangladeshi banknotes feature a tiger. The political party Muslim League of Pakistan uses the tiger as its election symbol. Tipu Sultan, who ruled Mysore in late 18th-century India, was also a great admirer of the animal. The famed 18th-century automaton Tipu's Tiger was also created for him. The tiger was the dynastic symbol of this dynasty. During the Indian Rebellion of 1857, Punch ran a political cartoon showing the Indian rebels as a tiger attacking a victim.

=== In arts ===
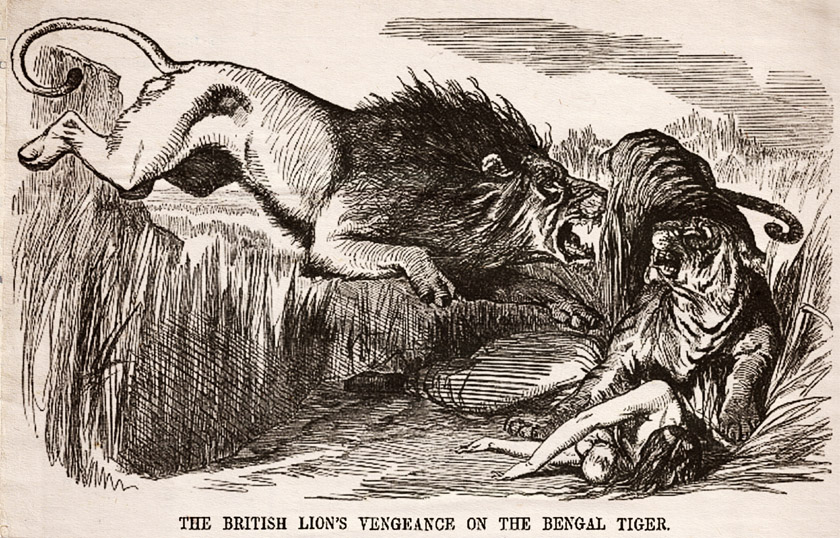
The British Lion's Vengeance on the Bengal Tiger, Punch cartoon from 1857

- The main antagonist of The Jungle Book story collection and related media franchise, Shere Khan, is a Bengal tiger
- The Man-Eaters of Kumaon is based on man-eating tigers and leopards in Kumaon Division.
- In the fantasy adventure novel Life of Pi and in its 2012 film adaptation, a Bengal tiger named Richard Parker is the lead character.
- The Bengal Tiger at the Baghdad Zoo is based on a real story of a tiger that escaped from Baghdad Zoo in 2003 and haunts the streets of Baghdad seeking the meaning of life.
- The Lost Land of the Tiger is a documentary by the BBC on tigers in Bhutan.
- The 2014 Indian film Roar – Tigers of the Sundarbans is about a white Bengal tigress in the Sundarbans.

=== Notable individuals ===
Notable Bengal tigers include the man-eating Tigers of Chowgarh, Chuka man-eating tiger, the Bachelor of Powalgarh and Thak man-eater, Tiger of Segur, Tiger of Mundachipallam, and the Wily Tiger of Mundachipallam.

== See also ==
  - Mainland Asian tiger populations: Caspian tiger
  - Indochinese tiger
  - Malayan tiger
  - Siberian tiger
  - South China tiger
  - Sunda Island tiger populations: Javan tiger
  - Sumatran tiger
  - Bali tiger
  - Bornean tiger
  - Prehistoric tigers: Panthera tigris soloensis
  - Panthera tigris trinilensis
  - Panthera tigris acutidens
- Holocene extinction
