= Rogue Nature =

American reality television program

- Created by: Dave Salmoni
- Starring: Dave Salmoni
- Country of origin: United States
- No. of episodes: 6

Production
- Running time: 44 minutes

Original release
- Network: USA: Discovery Channel, Discovery HD Theater, Animal Planet
- Release: April 2 – May 11, 2007

Rogue Nature is a reality television program broadcast in the United States on Discovery Channel, Discovery HD Theater, and Animal Planet. The show follows host, biologist Dave Salmoni, as he explores nature's most dangerous animals to determine if they really do intentionally kill humans. The series has six episodes.

== Reception ==
In a mixed review, Common Sense Media's Emily Ashy wrote that the show has "an intense, addictive quality that thrill-seeking viewers may enjoy" but that despite every episode featuring "a suspenseful build-up", "the urgency is quickly deflated" because the host's period of time in the wilderness is limited.

Sunday Mail called Rogue Nature an "edgy nature show" aimed at adult audiences because it includes explicit discussions of violent attacks and unsetting simulations. The Age television critic Brad Newsome said Salmoni "carries on as if practically every shot is the most dangerous in TV history" but that "there's some interesting stuff here".
