= Ratapani Tiger Reserve =

57th Tiger reserve in India

- Ratapani Wildlife Sanctuary
- IUCN category IV (habitat/species management area)
- Official logo

- Location within Madhya Pradesh Location within India
- Interactive map of Ratapani Tiger Reserve
- Location: Raisen district in Madhya Pradesh, India
- Coordinates: 22.918°N 77.722°E
- Area: 1,271.465 km^{2} (490.915 sq mi)
- Established: 1976 as wildlife sanctuary; 2024 as tiger reserve
- Governing body: Forest Department, Madhya Pradesh
- Website: Ratapani Wildlife Sanctuary

Ratapani Tiger Reserve a tiger reserve in the Raisen district of Madhya Pradesh in central India. It has been a wildlife sanctuary since 1976 and was declared as a tiger reserve in 2024.

== History ==
Ratapani was declared as a wildlife sanctuary 1976. In accordance with the directives issued by Chief Minister Mohan Yadav in December 2024, the Ratapani forest has been designated as the eighth tiger reserve in the state.

== Geography ==
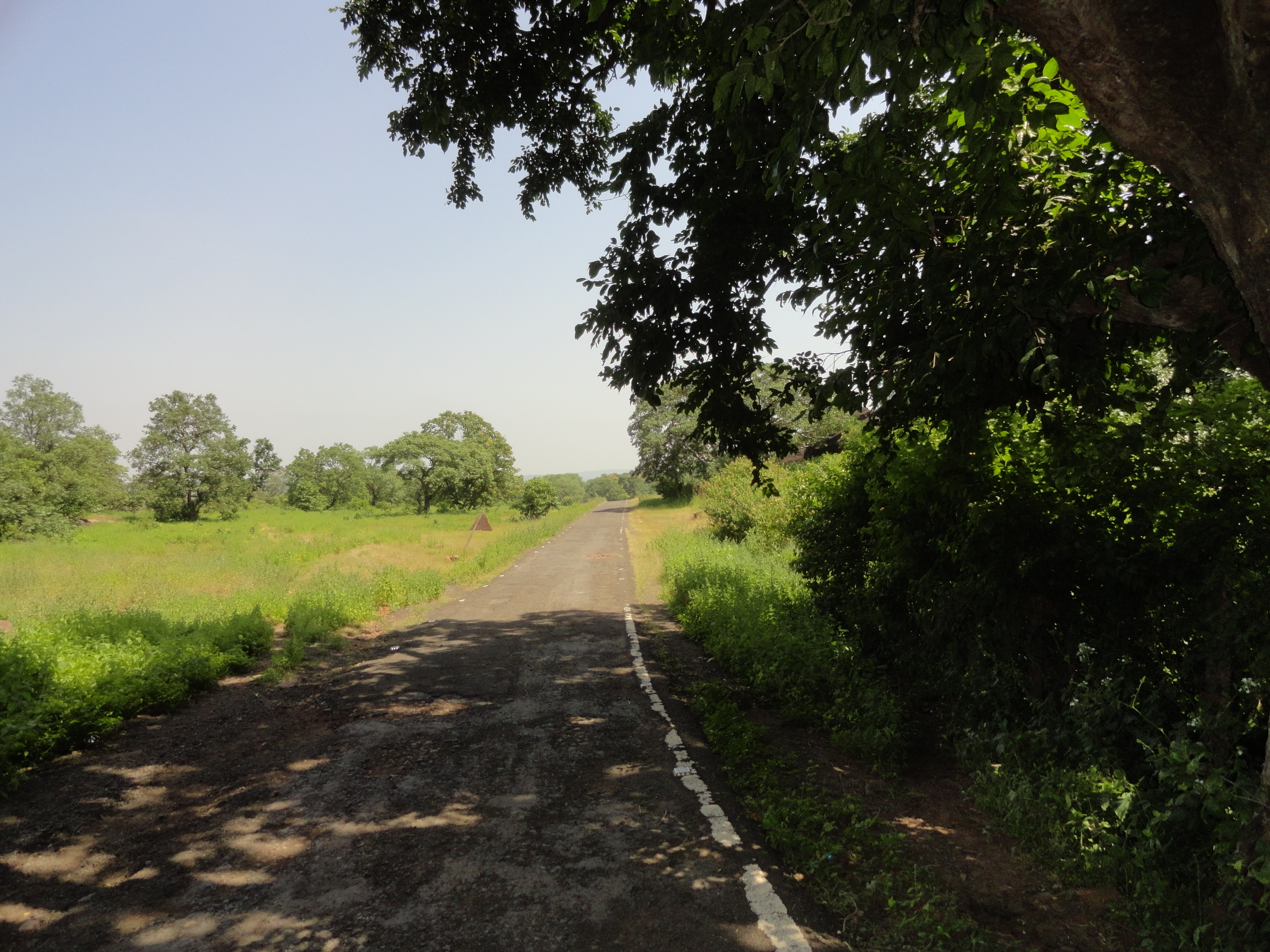
The road through Ratapani Tiger Reserve

Ratapani Tiger Reserve is located in Raisen district of Madhya Pradesh. It encompasses a total area of 1,271.465 km^{2} (490.915 sq mi), which includes a core area of 763.812 km^{2} (294.909 sq mi) and a buffer zone of 507.653 km^{2} (196.006 sq mi). The landscape is undulating, with hills, plateaus, valleys, plains and some seasonal streams. Water is retained in some pools along these streams in the summer. Barna Reservoir and Ratapani Dam are among the major waterbodies. The Bhimbetka rock shelters were inhabited by people hundreds of thousand years ago, and some of the rock paintings of the Stone Age are more than 30,000 years old. It has been declared a World Heritage Site by UNESCO.

== Flora ==
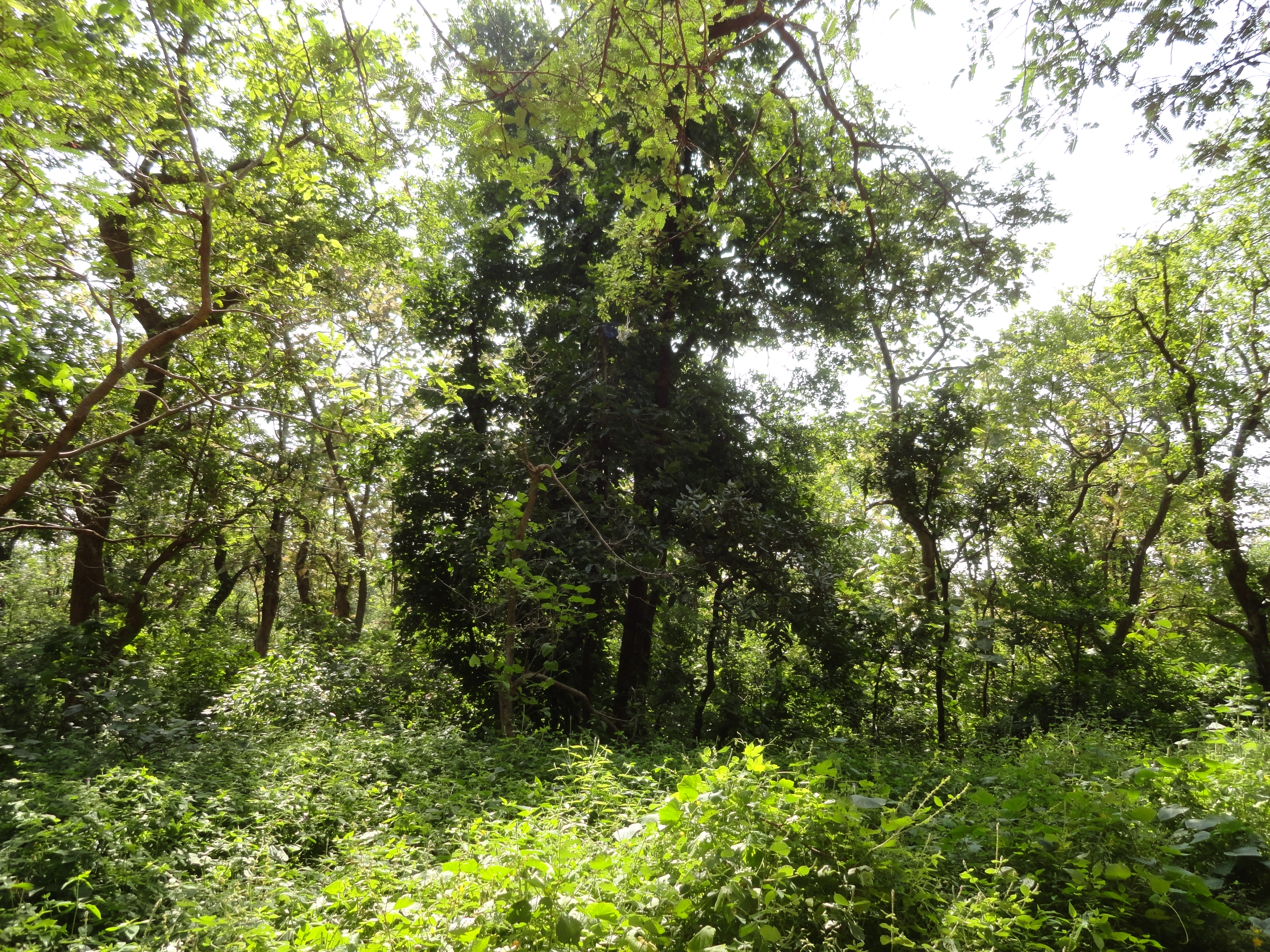
A view of the sanctuary

The forest of Ratapani is dry deciduous and moist deciduous type, with teak (Tectona grandis) as the main tree species. About 55% of the area is covered by teak. The remaining mixed forests consist of various dry deciduous species. Bamboo (Dendrocalamus strictus) overlaps the two aforementioned forest types and covers about one quarter of the forest area.

== Fauna ==
Carnivores in the sanctuary include the Bengal tiger, Indian leopard, dhole, striped hyena, golden jackal and fox; herbivores include chital, sambar, nilgai, four-horned antelope and wild boar, and langur and rhesus macaque. The sloth bear is also seen often. Smaller animals, like squirrels, mongooses, gerbils, porcupines, hares are common. Reptiles include lizards, chameleon, cobra, python, viper and krait.

=== Birds ===
Ratapani Wildlife Sanctuary harbours more than 150 bird species including the common babbler, coppersmith barbet, black drongo, blue jay, rock dove, bulbul, bee-eater, cuckoo, kingfishers, kite, lark, Bengal vulture, sunbirds, white wagtail, crow pheasant, jungle crow, egrets, myna, jungle fowl, parakeets, partridges, hoopoe, quails, woodpeckers, dove, flycatcher and flower pecker.
