= Into the Lion's Den =

- Directed by: Anton Truesdale
- Starring: Dave Salmoni
- Narrated by: Robert Jimenez
- Release date: February 4, 2004
- Running time: 90 minutes

Into the Lion's Den is a Discovery Channel documentary about zoologist and big cat trainer Dave Salmoni, armed only with a camera on a pole, carefully conditioning a wild pride of lions to accept his presence using behaviorial cues and body language. The footage has been published as a 90-minute movie (2004) directed by Anton Truesdale and narrated by Robert Jimenez. It is set in the Thornybush reservation in South Africa and depicts Salmoni's initial attempt to confirm his theory of safe cohabitation alongside a wild pride.

The movie was followed by a 5-part series called "Into the Pride" (2009) ("The Bush Rules", "A Tale of Two Alphas", "Queen Cleo", "The Breakthrough", "Homeward Bound") directed by Richard Slater-Jones. It is set into the Erindi reserve in Namibia and documents Salmoni's efforts to reintegrate a cattle-raiding pride so they won't have to be put down.
