= Running Wild (1995 film) =

- Directed by: Dee McLachlan
- Written by: Andrea Buck; Dee McLachlan; John Varty
- Produced by: John Varty; Dee McLachlan
- Starring: Brooke Shields; Martin Sheen; David Keith
- Cinematography: Justin Fouche
- Edited by: Derek Ward; Johan Lategan
- Music by: Grant Innes McLachlan
- Distributed by: Columbia TriStar Home Video
- Release date: 1995
- Running time: 94 min.
- Language: English

Running Wild (also known as Born Wild) is a 1995 film starring Brooke Shields, Martin Sheen and David Keith. It was written by Andrea Buck, Dee McLachlan (Note: Credited as Duncan McLachlan) and John Varty.

== Plot ==
A journalist for a struggling television station travels to Africa to meet conservationist and filmmaker John Varty, who has been following a mother leopard for several years. She believes this would make an interesting story for the station's viewers. However, things don't work out as planned as one of the station's executives is trying to stop her filming idea and the unfortunate death of the mother leopard.

== Main cast ==
- Brooke Shields ... Christine Shaye
- Martin Sheen ... Dan Walker
- David Keith ... Jack Hutton
- Norman Anstey ... Van Heerden
- Dale Dickey ... Judith
- Renée Estevez ... Aimee
- Greg Latter ... Stevens
- John Varty ... Himself
