= Living with Tigers =

2003 documentary about tigers

Living with Tigers is a 2003 documentary about tigers in Africa. It aired on Discovery.

The sequel to Living with Tigers is Tiger Man of Africa on the Discovery Channel.

== Synopsis ==
This documentary features a Bengal tiger re-wilding project started by John Varty in 2000. This project involves training captive-bred Bengal tiger cubs by their human trainers so that the tigers can regain their predatory instincts. Once they prove that they can sustain themselves in the wild, they would be released into the wilderness of Africa to fend for themselves. Their trainers, John Varty and Dave Salmoni (big-cat trainer and zoologist), have to teach them how to stalk, to hunt, and, most importantly, to associate hunting with food.

== Reception ==
It is claimed by some that two Bengal tigers have already succeeded in re-wilding, and two more tigers are currently undergoing their re-wilding training. This project is featured by The Discovery Channel as a documentary, Living With Tigers. It was voted one of the best Discovery Channel documentaries in 2003.

A strong criticism about this project is with the chosen cubs. Experts state that the four tigers (Ron, Julie, Seatao and Shadow) involved in the re-wilding project are not purebred Bengal tigers and should not be used for breeding. The four tigers are not recorded in the Bengal tiger studbook and should not be deemed as purebred Bengal tigers. Many tigers in the world's zoos are genetically impure, and there is no reason to suppose these four are not among them. The 1997 International Tiger Studbook lists the current global captive population of Bengal tigers at 210 tigers. All of the studbook-registered captive population is maintained in Indian zoos, except for one female Bengal tiger in North America. Ron and Julie (two of the tigers) were bred in the United States and hand-raised at Bowmanville Zoo in Canada, while Seatow and Shadow are two tigers bred in South Africa.

An additional criticism of the film involves the introduction of a species into a non-native range. Bengal tigers are only native to certain parts of Asia such as China, India and Nepal and historically, no tiger species has ever been existed in Africa aside from introduced individuals. Furthermore, tigers are an apex predator and a keystone species in their native range, meaning their existence in a foreign environment could have a major ecological impact. If successful, introduction of tigers in Africa could lead to them outcompeting other big cat species such as lions, leopards, and cheetahs while simultaneously decimating populations of native prey fauna. Because tigers are a top predator, this could have a trickle down effect, subsequently having a negative impact on smaller animals and also plants. Because of this, it has been questioned if this should be considered true "re-wilding" of a species when tigers are really only from Asia and Russia.

The tigers in the Tiger Canyons Project have recently been confirmed to be crossbred Siberian/Bengal tigers. Tigers that are not genetically pure are not allowed to participate in the tiger Species Survival Plan, which aims to breed genetically pure tiger specimens and individuals.

The documentary has been alleged by some to be a fraud. One source claims that the tigers are unable to hunt, and the film crew chased the prey up against the fence and into the path of the tigers just for the sake of dramatic footage. Cory Meacham, a US-based environmental journalist mentioned that "the film has about as much to do with tiger conservation as a Disney cartoon." An additional assertion is that the tigers have not been released and still reside in a small enclosure under constant watch and with frequent human contact. Some conservationists fear the public's being misled by false representation of footage.
