= John Varty =

South African wildlife filmmaker

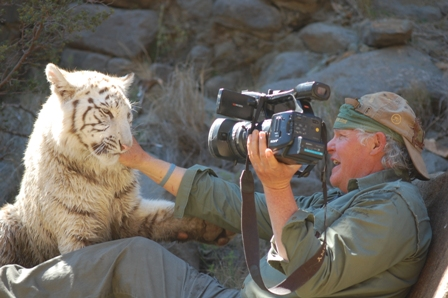
- Varty filming with a tigress in 2009
- Born: 27 November 1950 (age 75); Johannesburg, South Africa
- Occupations: Filmmaker, conservationist
- Spouse: Gillian van Houten (TV news anchor) (m. 1995)
- Children: 3
- Website: johnvarty.com

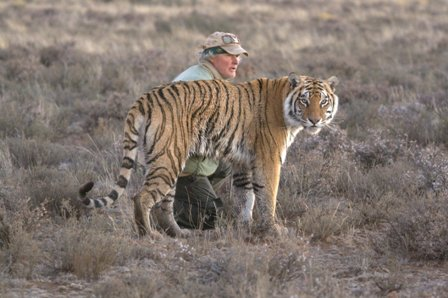
Varty and tigress Julie at Tiger Canyons, South Africa

John Varty (born 27 November 1950) is a South African wildlife filmmaker who has made more than 30 documentaries and one feature film. Varty is also leading a controversial project which aims to create a free-ranging, self-sustaining tiger population outside of Asia.

== Early life ==
Varty attended Parktown Boys' High School in Johannesburg. As a child, John learned about hunting on the family game farm near the Kruger National Park.

After his father, Charles, died, John and his brother, Dave Varty, terminated the hunting activities and converted it into a game reserve in 1973. They renamed it Londolozi, which is the Zulu word for "protector of living things". Since then it has become one of the top resorts in the world and was included in Travel and Leisure's world's best 4 times in the late 90s and early 2000s.

== Career ==
Varty made several documentaries that were widely distributed: Living with Tigers, Shingalana, Jamu, the Orphaned Leopard. Swift and silent won an American Cable TV award in 1993 and The Silent Hunter won The New York Gold Award.

In 1992, he wrote, produced and starred in Running Wild, a feature film starring Brooke Shields.

In 2011, Varty starred in Leopard Queen, a documentary about a leopard he has filmed for 17 years.

=== Tiger re-wilding project ===
In 2000, Varty started a Bengal tiger re-wilding project near Philippolis in the Free State. Starting with captive bred tigers, the aim is to establish a wild tiger population outside of Asia. In 2003, the progress was documented in a The Discovery Channel production called Living with Tigers. In 2011, National Geographic made a second documentary called Tiger Man of Africa.

The project was the subject of controversy after accusations by investors and conservationists of manipulating the behaviour of the tigers for the purpose of the production of the film Living with Tigers, with the tigers believed to be unable to hunt. Stuart Bray, who had originally invested a large sum of money in the project, claimed that he and his wife, Li Quan, watched the film crew "[chase] the prey up against the fence and into the path of the tigers just for the sake of dramatic footage." Quan and Bray also accused them of financial mismanagement after a legal audit uncovered that he had borrowed R5.7-million of the funds for extraneous and personal expenses. Quan and Bray subsequently established the Save China's Tigers Laohu Valley Reserve, also near Philippolis.

Moreover, scientists have also established that the tigers are not genetically pure, which would imply that the project has no conservation value.

On 29 March 2012, Varty was critically injured when one of his tigers attacked him on his farm near Philippolis. He suffered multiple injures and puncture wounds all over his body. He spent approximately one month in hospital.

In January 2014, KIA South Africa released a TV commercial, Tiger in Africa, with Varty's footage shot at Tiger Canyons.

In 2019, Getaway reported there were 18 Bengal tigers at Tiger Canyon.

== Filmography ==
- Living with Tigers
- A Secret Life
- Ambush in Paradise
- Brothers in Arms
- Cycle of the Seasons
- Defining Moments
- Horn and Claw
- Hunters
- Hyaena the Great Opportunist
- Jamu the Orphaned Leopard
- Londolozi's Africa
- Perfect Mothers
- Perfect Predators
- Return of the Kings
- River Dinosaur
- Savage Instinct
- Savannah Cats
- Sense and Scentability
- Shingalana
- Super Hunts Super Hunters
- Survival on the Savannah
- Swift and Silent
- The Brotherhood
- The Mating Game
- The Silent Hunter
- The Super Predators
- The Tracker
- Troubled Waters
- Wet and Wild

== Bibliography ==
- Nine Lives (2011)
- In the Jaws of the Tiger (2013)

== Other articles/books ==
- Varty, Boyd. Cathedral of the Wild: An African Journey Home, Random House (2014).
