= 1904 International Cross Country Championships =

- Organisers: ICCU
- Edition: 2nd
- Date: 26 March
- Host city: St Helens, Lancashire, England
- Venue: Haydock Park
- Events: 1
- Distances: 13.7 kilometres (8.5 mi)
- Participation: 46 athletes from 4 nations

The 1904 International Cross Country Championships was held in St Helens, England, at the Haydock Park Racecourse on 26 March 1904. A report on the event was given in the Glasgow Herald.

Complete results, medalists, and the results of British athletes were published.

== Medalists ==
Event	Gold		Silver		Bronze	
Individual
Men (13.7 kilometres (8.5 mi))	Alfred Shrubb; England	47:58.4	Albert Aldridge; England	48:20.2	George Pearce; England	49:38.6
Team
Men	England	27	Wales	102	Scotland	113

== Individual Race Results ==
=== Men's (8.5 mi / 13.7 km) ===
Rank	Athlete	Nationality	Time
1st place, gold medalist(s)	Alfred Shrubb	England	47:58.4
2nd place, silver medalist(s)	Albert Aldridge	England	48:20.2
3rd place, bronze medalist(s)	George Pearce	England	49:38.6
4	John Daly	Ireland	50:03
5	Fred Neaves	England	50:04
6	Jack Marsh	Wales	50:42
7	Billy Day	England	50:56
8	T. Hughes	Wales	51:00
9	Frank James	England	51:14
10	William Hickman	England	51:30
11	John Ranken	Scotland	51:38
12	Tom Downing	Ireland	51:44
13	James Barrie	Scotland	51:47
14	George Whiston	England	51:55
15	A. Campbell	England	52:02
16	Arthur Meacham	England	52:05
17	Hugh Muldoon	Ireland	52:12
18	Duncan Mill	Scotland	52:13
19	Robert Davies	Wales	52:14
20	James Reston	Scotland	52:15
21	D.G. Harris	Wales	52:18
22	Edgar Price	Wales	52:19
23	F.W. Webber	England	52:24
24	James Ure	Scotland	52:27
25	Sam Lee	Ireland	52:34
26	Rhys Evans	Wales	52:40
27	Sam Kennedy	Scotland	52:49
28	Walter Bradbury	Wales	52:53
29	George Mackenzie	Scotland	52:54
30	Michael Hynan	Ireland	52:56
31	George Arnot	Scotland	52:57
32	Pat Hehir	Ireland	52:59
33	Pat Molloy	Ireland	53:00
34	Ernest Thomas	Wales	53:05
35	Frank Peelo	Ireland	53:11
36	Sam Stevenson	Scotland	53:13
37	A. Arblaster	England	53:19
38	Robert Pugh	Wales	53:53
39	William Robertson	Scotland	53:59
40	J.J. Doyle	Ireland	55:23
41	W. Francis	Wales	55:52
42	Oscar Cunningham	Ireland	57:08
43	C.W. Winter	Wales	58:21
—	Thomas Mulrine	Scotland	DNF
—	Peter Wright	Scotland	DNF
—	Eddie Francis	Wales	DNF

== Team Results ==
=== Men's ===
Rank	Country	Team	Points
1	England	Alfred Shrubb; Albert Aldridge; George Pearce; Fred Neaves; Billy Day; Frank James	27
2	Wales	Jack Marsh; T. Hughes; Robert Davies; D.G. Harris; Edgar Price; Rhys Evans	102
3	Scotland	John Ranken; James Barrie; Duncan Mill; James Reston; James Ure; Sam Kennedy	113
4	Ireland	John Daly; Tom Downing; Hugh Muldoon; Sam Lee; Michael Hynan; Pat Hehir	120

== Participation ==
An unofficial count yields the participation of 46 athletes from 4 countries.

- England (12)
- Ireland (10)
- Scotland (12)
- Wales (12)
