= Maggie the Monkey =

Macaque; animal oracle

Maggie the Monkey, also Maggie the Macaque (born 1991), is a crab-eating macaque from the Bowmanville Zoo used as an animal oracle to make predictions of the Stanley Cup Playoffs.

== History ==
Maggie was born and hand-raised at the Bowmanville Zoo in Bowmanville, Ontario, Canada. At the zoo, she was trained to spin a wheel. In 2003, several executives and expert panelists from the Canadian sports broadcaster TSN decided they would "do something random" with their show, and they ended up bringing Maggie onto their broadcasts to make predictions. While the expert panelists all overwhelmingly favored the reigning Stanley Cup champion and number-two seed Detroit Red Wings to defeat the seventh-seeded Mighty Ducks of Anaheim in the first round of the 2003 Stanley Cup Playoffs, Maggie spun a wheel and selected the Ducks. Astoundingly, the Mighty Ducks upset the Red Wings in a four-game sweep. As the playoffs progressed, Maggie kept pace with the panelists and continued to select the Ducks each round. The Ducks eventually lost the Stanley Cup to the New Jersey Devils in seven games, but Maggie's overall record was 8–7; Maggie finished one guess behind three panelists, tied two, and defeated one. During her playoff run, Maggie became extremely popular, especially in Anaheim — she was even featured on the front page of the Los Angeles Times.

For the 2004 Stanley Cup Playoffs, Maggie was given her own segment on TSN called The Ape-rentice, an obvious parody of the popular reality television show The Apprentice. While her picks were not as successful as in the previous year, she finished with an overall record of 7–8, again losing to three panelists, tying two, and defeating one.

When a poll was done in the 2005–06 season, 74% of TSN viewers said they wanted to see Maggie during the playoffs again. Maggie's best year was 2006. While she incorrectly selected the Edmonton Oilers to defeat the Carolina Hurricanes for the championship, she still finished first out of a panel made up of Bob McKenzie, Pierre McGuire, and Bill Berg. In 2008, she made eight correct predictions out of 15. In the first round of the 2009 Stanley Cup Playoffs, Maggie went a disappointing 2–6. She continued to disappoint during the rest of the playoffs, but for her first time, she selected the Stanley Cup winner correctly.

== Method ==
Maggie's method of selecting teams is entirely random. She is presented with a wheel (similar to a carnival big six wheel), divided into sections. Half the sections display one team in a particular playoff matchup, the other half display the opposing team. Prompted by her handler, Maggie then spins it — whichever team is picked is her selection to win the best-of-seven series. James Duthie of TSN claimed in 2003 that one of the primary motives behind having Maggie on the network was because of the unpredictability of hockey.

== Record ==
Playoff year	Correct	Incorrect
2003	8	7
2004	7	8
2006	9	6
2007	8	7
2008	8	7
2009	5	10
Total	45	45

== See also ==
- Sports betting
- Ice hockey
- Paul the Octopus
- List of individual monkeys
