= 1903 International Cross Country Championships =

- Organisers: ICCU
- Edition: 1st
- Date: 28 March
- Host city: Hamilton, South Lanarkshire, Scotland
- Venue: Hamilton Park
- Events: 1
- Distances: 8.5 mi (13.7 km)
- Participation: 45 athletes from 4 nations

The 1903 International Cross Country Championships was held in Hamilton, Scotland, at the Hamilton Park on 28 March 1903. A preview of the event and an appraisal of the results appeared in the Glasgow Herald.

Complete results, medalists, and the results of British athletes were published.

== Medalists ==
Event	Gold		Silver		Bronze	
Individual
Men; 8.5 mi (13.7 km)	Alfred Shrubb; England	46:22.6	Tom Edwards; England	46:56.6	John Daly; Ireland	47:10.2
Team
Men	England	25	Ireland	78	Scotland	107

== Individual Race Results ==
=== Men's (8.5 mi /13.7 km) ===
Rank	Athlete	Nationality	Time
1st place, gold medalist(s)	Alfred Shrubb	England	46:22.6
2nd place, silver medalist(s)	Tom Edwards	England	46:56.6
3rd place, bronze medalist(s)	John Daly	Ireland	47:10.2
4	Albert Aldridge	England	47:10.2
5	Sidney Robinson	England	47:21
6	W.A. Mercer	England	47:37
7	Harry Lawson	England	47:50
8	Tom Hynes	Ireland	47:58
9	J. Thomas	England	48:10
10	James Crosbie	Scotland	48:47.4
11	George Smith	England	48:51
12	Jack Marsh	Wales	48:54
13	J. Creedon	Ireland	49:00
14	John Ranken	Scotland	49:08
15	Charlie Silsby	England	49:14
16	Pat Whyte	Ireland	49:18
17	James Ure	Scotland	49:25
18	Frank Curtis	Ireland	49:26
19	D.G. Harris	Wales	49:40
20	P.J. McCafferty	Ireland	49:41
21	T.C. Hughes	Scotland	49:51
22	James Reston	Scotland	49:59
23	Thomas Mulrine	Scotland	50:02
24	James Hosker	England	50:22
25	Arthur Turner	Wales	50:25
26	Hugh Muldoon	Ireland	50:38
27	Albert Palmer	Wales	50:42
28	Robert Davies	Wales	50:45
29	Ernest Thomas	Wales	50:47
30	Fullerton Wilson	Scotland	50:50
31	Pat Hehir	Ireland	50:51
32	Rhys Evans	Wales	50:58
33	Albert Horne	England	51:16
34	Tom Johnston	Scotland	51:18
35	Robert Pugh	Wales	51:30
36	Allan Rees	Wales	52:01
37	W. Davies	Wales	52:01
38	W. Grail	Wales	52:33
39	Thomas Baggs	Wales	52:44
40	James Butters	Scotland	52:57
41	Alex Kinnaird	Scotland	53:02
—	Phil Randles	England	DNF
—	William Robertson	Scotland	DNF
—	Robert Frew	Scotland	DNF
—	Tom Hamilton	Ireland	DNF

== Team Results ==
=== Men's ===
Rank	Country	Team	Points
1	England	Alfred Shrubb; Tom Edwards; Albert Aldridge; Sidney Robinson; W.A. Mercer; Harry Lawson	25
2	Ireland	John Daly; Tom Hynes; J. Creedon; Pat Whyte; Frank Curtis; P.J. Mccafferty	78
3	Scotland	James Crosbie; John Ranken; James Ure; T.C. Hughes; James Reston; Thomas Mulrine	107
4	Wales	Jack Marsh; D.G. Harris; Arthur Turner; Albert Palmer; Robert Davies; Ernest Thomas	140

== Participation ==
An unofficial count yields the participation of 45 athletes from 4 countries.

- England (12)
- Ireland (9)
- Scotland (12)
- Wales (12)

== See also ==
- 1903 in athletics (track and field)
