= Bowmanville Foundry =

Foundry located in Bowmanville, Ontario, Canada

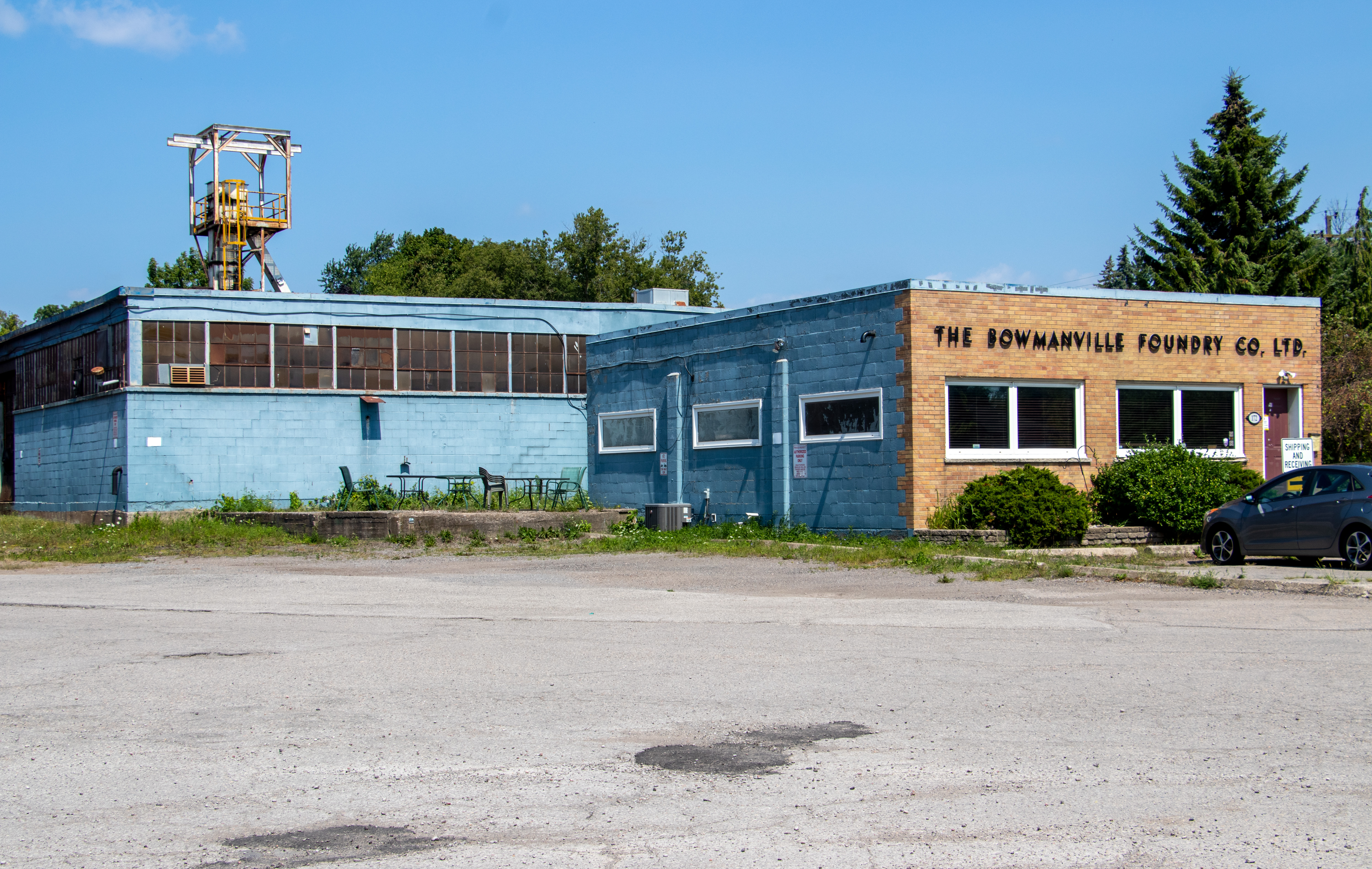
- Founded: 1901; 125 years ago
- Headquarters: Bowmanville, Ontario, Canada

Bowmanville Foundry Co. Ltd. is a foundry located in Bowmanville, Ontario, Canada. The company has a long history in the manufacture of ductile, gray iron and malleable iron castings.

== History ==
The company was established in 1901 by Christian Rehder, who managed the business until his death in 1941, when his son Ernie took over. After Ernie died in 1978 his sons Tom and Lawrence took over, with some technical guidance from Ernie's oldest son Ned, who did not work at the factory but was a highly respected metallurgist. The company was sold in 1988 to people outside of the family.

A 2005 book titled Iron in the Blood (ISBN 0-9736633-0-8) by local authors Helen Bajorek MacDonald and Helen Lewis Schmid, discusses the history of the company in the context of family, community, labour and economic history. The official launch of Iron in the Blood was mentioned in the Ontario Legislature by John O'Toole, the member for Durham.
