= Bowmanville Zoo =

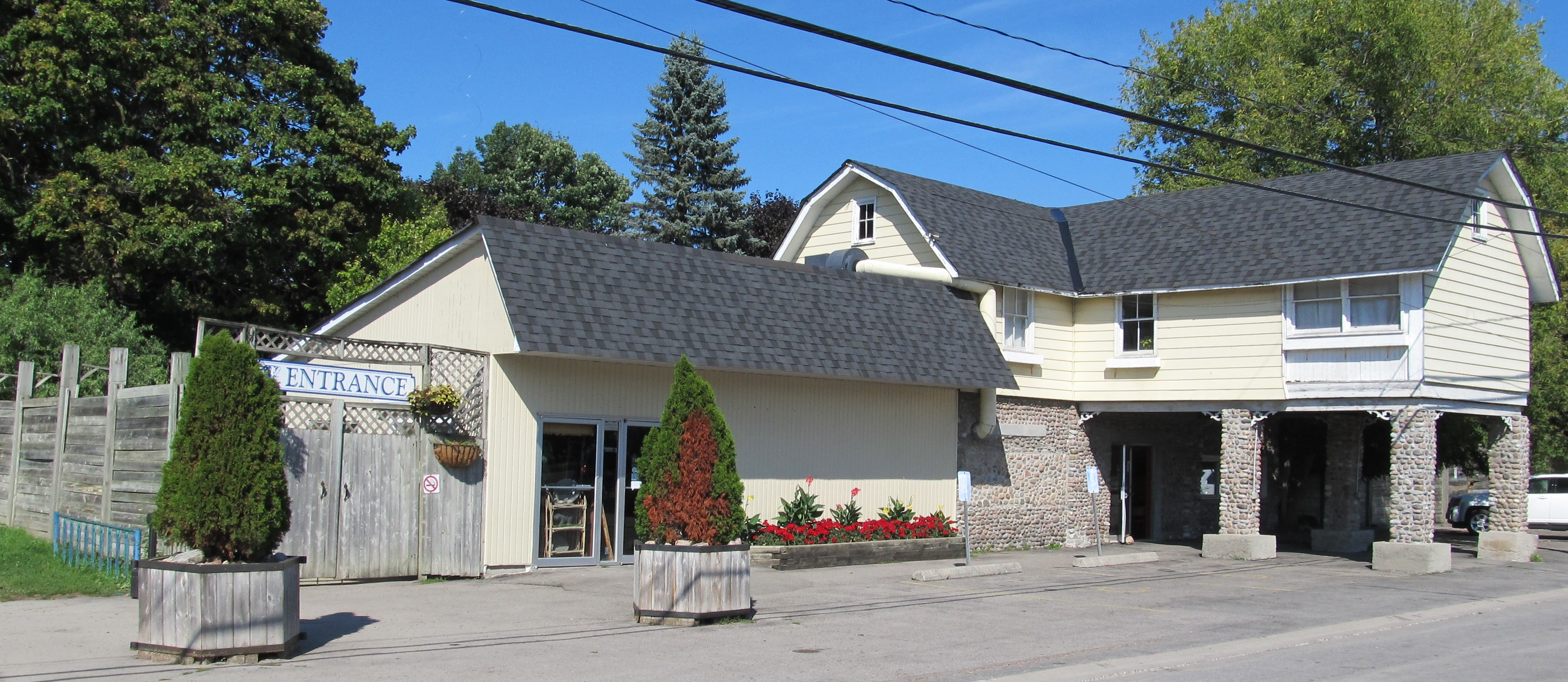
- Entrance to the Bowmanville Zoo
- Interactive map of Bowmanville Zoo
- 43.912811°N 78.668456°W
- Date opened: 1919
- Date closed: 10 October 2016
- Location: 340 King Street East, Clarington, Ontario, Canada
- Land area: 42 acres (17 ha)
- No. of animals: 300
- Memberships: CAZA

Bowmanville Zoo was a zoo in Clarington, Ontario, Canada. Founded in 1919, at the time of its closure, in 2016, it was the oldest private zoo in North America. It was a large supplier of animals to the U.S. film industry.

About 100,000 people visited the zoo each year, a figure which dropped by more than two thirds in its final year. The Bowmanville Zoo officially closed on 10 October 2016.

== History ==
The land now occupied by the zoo, on the banks of Soper Creek, was part of the grounds of the Cream of Barley Mill, located further south on the creek. The mill owner developed a campground and park for tourists, named The Cream of Barley Campground, on the part of the property that was near the highway. Later, a petting zoo was added to the park.

By 1928, the mill, camp, and park (which now included tourist cabins) were owned by James Morden and operated by Alfred Shrubb, formerly a long-distance runner. By 1946, the park included tennis courts.

Over time, the zoo aspect of the business became more prominent, and the cabins were turned into animal shelters and storage buildings.

Toronto native Michael Hackenberger was the final owner of this Canadian zoo starting in 1988. In April 2016, Hackenberger was charged with 5 counts of animal abuse by the Ontario Society for the Prevention of Cruelty to Animals (OSPCA) due to a video obtained by PETA of Hackenberger whipping a young leashed tiger profusely while swearing at it.

== Animals ==
Some of the animal talent included:

- Limba, female Asian elephant in Billy Madison
- Baghera, the black jaguar from Peter Benchley's Amazon
- a bevy of camels from The 13th Warrior starring Antonio Banderas
- Ron and Julie, the two Bengal/Siberian tiger hybrid siblings starring in the Discovery Channel/Animal Planet documentary, Living with Tigers
- Caesar, the African lion from Rude, The Ghost and the Darkness and George of the Jungle along with his brother Bongo
- Billy, the white Bengal tiger from the TV series Animorphs
- Bongo, the African lion from the movies The Ghost and the Darkness, George of the Jungle, Rude, and from the TV series Animorphs
- Maggie the Macaque, known for her Stanley Cup Playoffs predictions
- Jonas, the Bengal tiger from the film adaptation of Life of Pi
- Robbie, a Siberian tiger from the controversial 2014 film The Interview

=== Elephants ===
The zoo once had seven elephants with a mix of African and Asian.

Limba was the lone Asian elephant at the zoo; she arrived in 1989 and was euthanized in late 2013 at the age of 50 after a malignant tumor was found in her abdomen. The pachyderm was well known for appearing in Bowmanville's annual Santa Claus Parade and several movies. With her death and closure of Toronto Zoo's elephant exhibit, the only zoo in Ontario with elephants is the African Lion Safari.

== Traveling exhibits ==
Animals from the Bowmanville Zoo are sometimes displayed as part of shows in various parts of Canada.

Two camels, Shawn and Todd, along with Jonas the tiger, went missing for two days on the way home from one of these trips when their trailer, along with the truck pulling it, was stolen near Drummondville, Quebec in 2010. All three were found in good health and returned to the zoo.

== Programs ==
The zoo participated in breeding programs for endangered species, and also accepted retired circus animals.

== Controversy ==
In December 2015, the Bowmanville Zoo owner, Michael Hackenberger was accused by People for the Ethical Treatment of Animals (PETA) of animal cruelty. PETA released a video taken secretly which showed Hackenberger cursing and cracking a whip numerous times at a young Siberian tiger named Uno.

In response to PETA's allegations, Hackenberger released his own video statement. In it, he asserts that although his "language is atrocious and I apologize for that," "PETA, once again, is lying." He stated that only two of the 19 cracks of the whip shown in the video struck the tiger, with the remainder striking either the air or the ground immediately adjacent to the tiger. He also challenged PETA to release the full length of the video taken.

Earlier in 2015, Hackenberger was filmed on live television swearing at a baboon for failing to complete a trick, which involved its jumping off the back of a miniature pony.

On 13 April 2016, as a result of the video of Michael Hackenberger whipping the leashed tiger, five animal cruelty charges were brought against him. The Ontario Society for the Prevention of Cruelty to Animals says it began investigating alleged abuse at the Bowmanville Zoo immediately after reviewing the footage that emerged in December. The agency said the zoo's owner, Michael Hackenberger, was charged with four counts of causing an animal distress; causing an animal distress by striking the animal with a whip handle, causing an animal distress by repeatedly striking an animal with a whip, causing an animal to be in distress by striking the animal in the face with a whip, and causing an animal distress by pushing his thumb into the animals eye. The last charge was one of failing to comply with the prescribed standards of care for an animal. Three of the distress charges relate to the use of a whip, and one related to Hackenberger pushing his thumb into the tigers eye. The OSPCA said it would continue to conduct inspections of the zoo and continue to closely monitor the animals there.

On 23 March 2017, the charges against Michael Hackenberger were judicially stayed. They were automatically withdrawn a year later, on 23 March 2018.

== Closure ==
On 23 June 2016, the zoo announced that it would close its doors at the end of the 2016 season, just three years short of its 100-year anniversary which was to occur in 2019. Zoo officials announced that the closure would occur as a result of financial issues caused by a catastrophic decline in attendance following the zoo's owner being charged with animal cruelty. The zoo officially closed its doors on 10 October 2016.

In 2017 the property re-opened as Clarington Family Outdoor Adventure Park and still featured lions and some staff from previous operations.

In October 2018 initial plans to transform the zoo property into a large municipal park were announced. In May 2026, the municipality began work on the park, which will include a playground, trails, and an outdoor amphitheater. It is scheduled to open summer 2026.
