= Bowmanville =

Community in Ontario, Canada

- Community (Dissolved town)
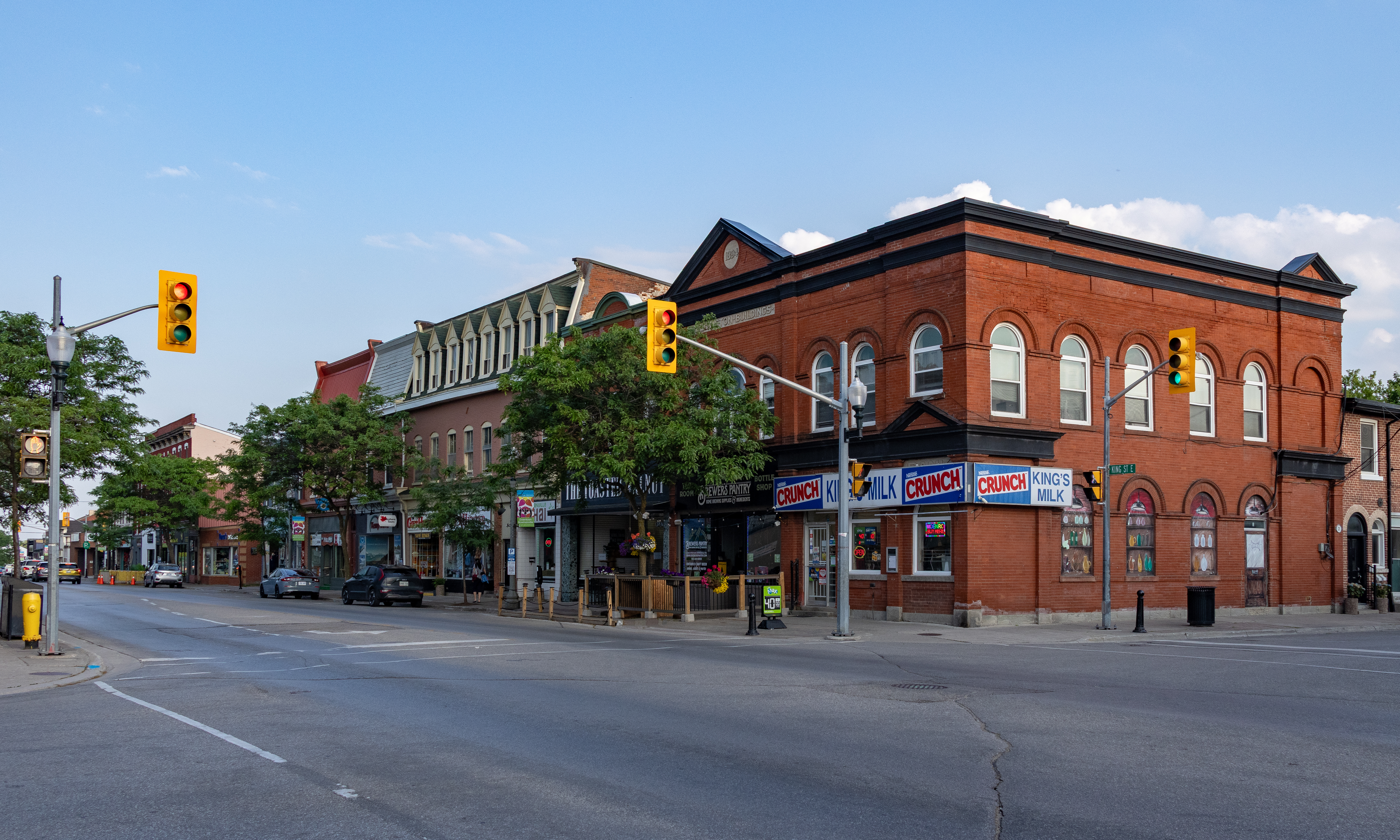
- Downtown Bowmanville in 2025

- Location within Regional Municipality of Durham Location within Southern Ontario
- Coordinates: 43°54′41″N 78°41′15″W
- Country: Canada
- Province: Ontario
- Regional municipality: Durham
- Municipality: Clarington

Government
  - Type: Municipality
  - Mayor: Adrian Foster

Area
  - Total: 21.7 km^{2} (8.4 sq mi)
- Elevation: 150 m (490 ft)

Population (May 10, 2016)
  - Total: 56,742
  - Density: 1,814/km^{2} (4,700/sq mi)
- Time zone: UTC−5 (EST)
  - Summer (DST): UTC−4 (EDT)
- Forward sortation area: L1B to L1E
- Area codes: 905 and 289
- NTS Map: 30M15 Oshawa
- GNBC Code: FDGDW
- Website: http://www.bowmanville.com

Bowmanville is a community of approximately 60,000 people located in the municipality of Clarington, in the Durham Region of Southern Ontario, Canada. It is approximately 75 km (47 mi) east of Toronto, and 15 km (9.3 mi) east of Oshawa along Highway 2. Bowmanville was first incorporated as a town in 1858, but later incorporated with the neighbouring townships of Clarke and Darlington in 1974 forming the Town of Newcastle, which was renamed in 1994 to the Municipality of Clarington. Bowmanville is part of the Greater Toronto Area.

== History ==
In 1794, John Burk and his family arrived 1-mile (1.6 km) west of Barber's Creek (now Bowmanville Creek) on the beach of Lake Ontario, attracted to Canada when John Graves Simcoe proclaimed that all males over 18 who settled in the country would receive 200 acres (81 ha) of land. Burk purchased land and began to clear the forest in an area that would become Bowmanville.

Mills were built first on Barber's Creek (now called Bowmanville Creek), including Vanstone's Mill, which still stands today at the present-day intersection of King Street and Scugog St. More mills were built on nearby Soper Creek. One of them still stands and houses the municipality's Visual Arts Centre, which has been designated as an architecturally protected historical building.

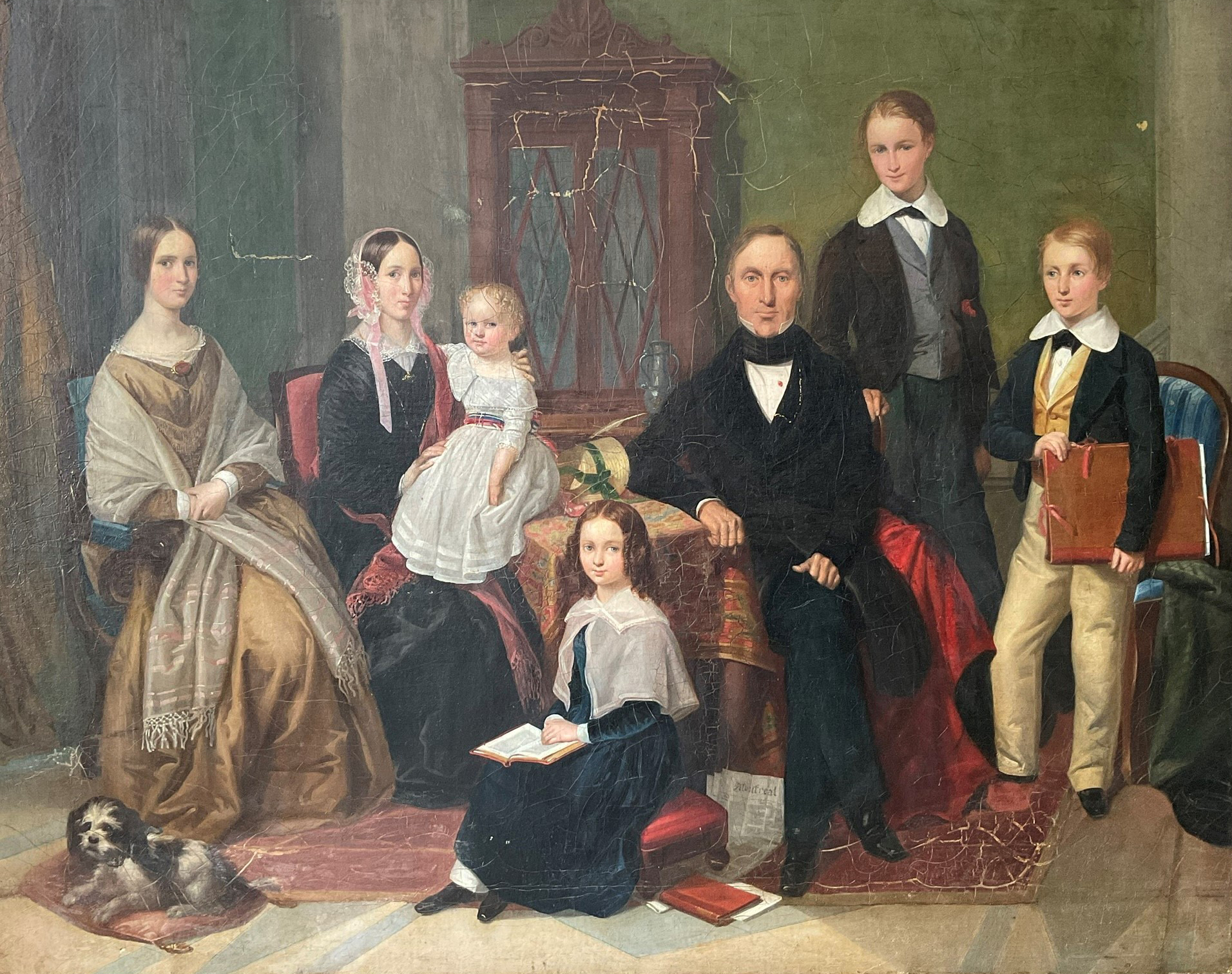
Charles Bowman, the namesake of Bowmanville in the only known painting, with his family.

Burk later sold his land to Lewis Lewis. Lewis opened the first store in what was then called Darlington Mills. Charles Bowman (for whom the town was eventually named) purchased the store around 1824. He then established the settlement's first post office. Its first postmaster, Robert Fairbairn, ran the post office from 1828 to 1857. Bowmanville incorporated as a town in 1858.

By 1866, the town of Bowmanville had a population of about 3,500 in the township of Darlington, County Durham, on the north shore of Lake Ontario. A station of the Grand Trunk Railway was located there. The town possessed a good harbour, and extensive water power potential in its vicinity. The surrounding country was fertile.

The success of the Vanstone Mill, fueled by the Crown's land grant program, led to rapid expansion of the Bowmanville settlement in the early years of the 19th century. Under the generous yet discriminating eyes of wealthy local merchants such as John Simpson and Charles Bowman, small properties were sold to promote settlement and small business. The town developed a balanced economy; all the while gradually establishing itself as a moderate player in shipping, rail transport, metal works and common minor business (including tanneries, liveries, stables and everyday mercantile trade in commodities).

By the time of Confederation (1867), Bowmanville was a vital, prosperous and growing town, home to a largely Scots-Presbyterian community with all manner of farmers, workers, and professionals making the town their home. It had local economic stability and accessible, abundant land available for the construction of housing. The town soon supported several new churches, each designated to house Free and Auld Kirk, Anglican and Nonconformist congregations, including the Bible Christian Church, later to be a major stream of Canadian Methodism.

At present, St. John's Anglican Church. St. Andrew's Presbyterian Church, St. Paul's United Church and the impressively ornate Trinity United Church (site of an old Auld Kirk church) still serve the community. All of these edifices, appropriately, lie on or are in close proximity to present-day Church Street.

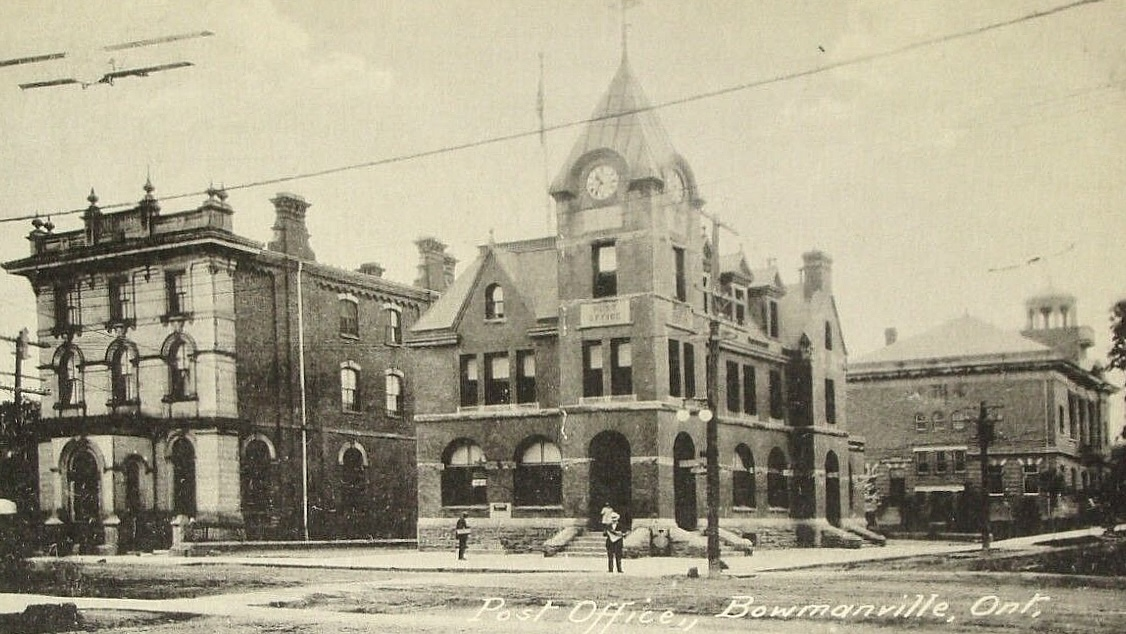
Postcard of the former Post Office, circa 1920s. The Town Hall building is visible to the right.

In the 19th century, in 1857, the Ontario Bank was founded in Bowmanville, with local resident John Simpson as its first president. The bank, while appearing to be a local enterprise, was primarily controlled by 16 Montreal businessmen. The Ontario bank eventually opened local branches including locations in Whitby, Oshawa, and Port Hope. In 1874, it was moved to Toronto, and would later become insolvent as a result of investing in speculative stocks in 1906. The historic Ontario Bank building at the intersection of King and Temperance was demolished in 1971

Census	Population
Town of Bowmanville
1841	500
1871	3,034
1881	3,504
1891	3,377
1901	2,731
1911	2,814
1921	3,233
1931	4,080
1941	4,113
1951	5,430
1961	7,397
1971	8,947
Town of Newcastle
1981	32,229
1991	49,479
Bowmanville - Newcastle
2001	32,777
2006	38,966
2011	43,555
Bowmanville
2011	35,168
2016	39,371
2021	56,742

In 1884, Scottish immigrant John McKay opened the Cream of Barley Mill next to Soper Creek to manufacture a cereal of his own creation. "Cream of Barley" was shipped throughout the British Empire.

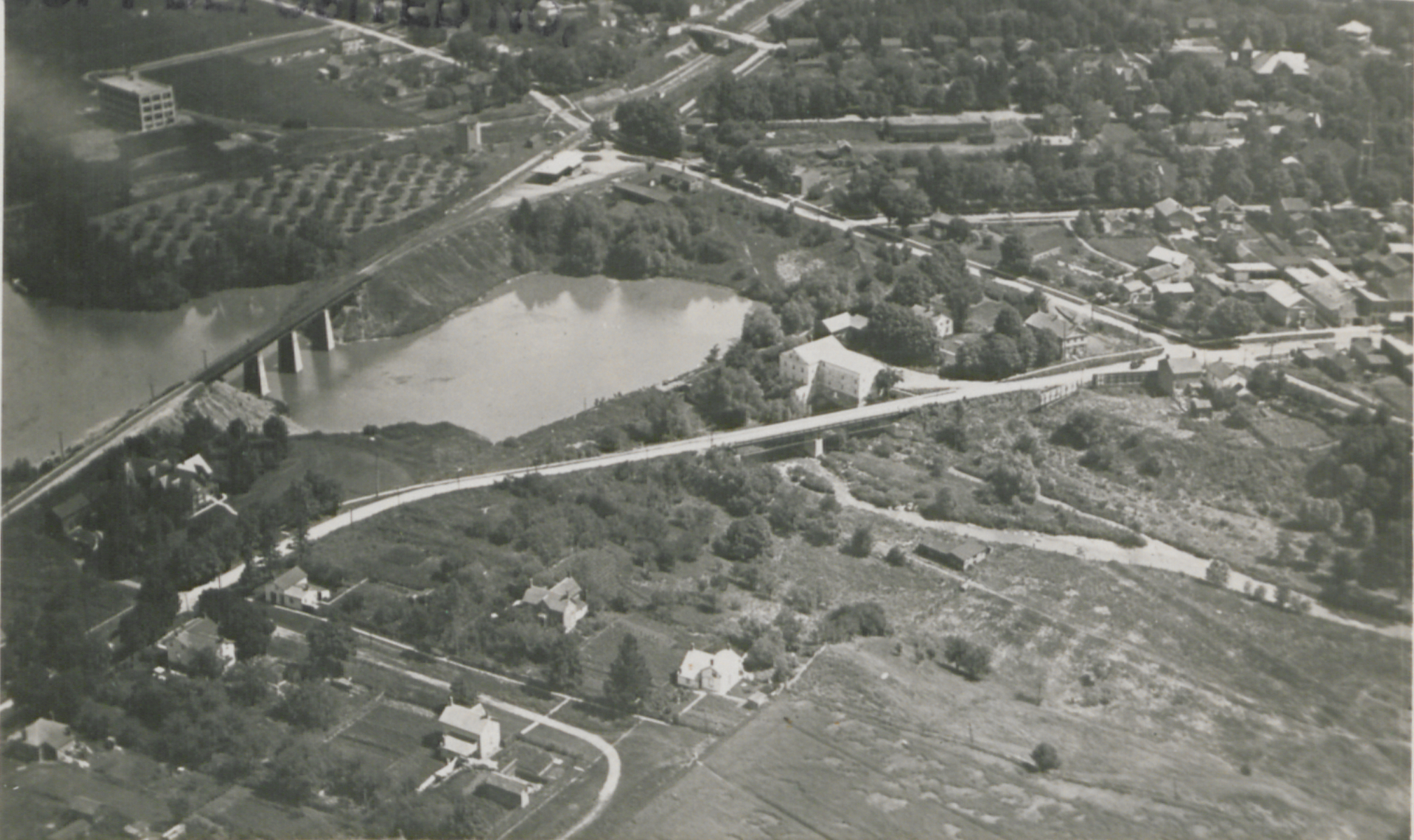
Aerial photo taken in 1919. Vanstone Mill and pond can be seen, along with the Vanstone CPR bridge.

Local business organized and modernized in the 20th century, with the Dominion Organ and Piano factory, Specialty Paper Company, the Bowmanville Foundry, and the Goodyear Tire and Rubber Company (1910) all providing steady work for Bowmanville's ever-growing working populations. Goodyear even went so far as to provide affordable housing for its employees, and present day Carlisle Ave. (built by Goodyear president W.C. Carlisle) in the 1910s still stands as one of Ontario's best preserved examples of industrial housing. The land on which the Bowmanville Hospital was built was donated by J.W. Alexander, the owner of the then-prospering Dominion Organ and Piano factory.

Formal education evolved in-step with Ryersonian philosophies of the day, and the advent of the Central Public School (1889) and the Bowmanville High School (1890), (both designed by Whitby architect A.A. Post) were the finishing touches to the town that was a model of then-Ontario Premier Oliver Mowat's philosophy of education, expansion and innovation for the citizens of the province.

The 20th century saw a steady rise in the construction of area schools, with Vincent Massey P.S. (1955); St. Joseph Catholic Elementary (1962, 2000 at present site); Waverly P.S. (1978); Dr. Ross Tilley P.S. (1993); St. Elizabeth Catholic Elementary (1998); John M. James P.S. (1999); Harold Longworth P.S. (2003); and Holy Family Catholic Elementary School (2007), all accommodating gradual population increases and building developments in specific demographic areas of the town. The local school board was amalgamated with neighboring jurisdictions to form the Kawartha Pine Ridge District School Board in 1997. The Catholic schools are part of the Peterborough Victoria Northumberland and Clarington Catholic District School Board which had already merged four counties in 1969 (at that time it was named the Peterborough, Victoria, Northumberland and Durham Separate School Board).

As the town grew and prospered, so arrived Bowmanville's grand era of architectural building and refinement. Specimens of Italianate, Gothic Revival, Colonial Brick and Queen Anne architecture remain in Bowmanville's older central neighborhoods. Much of Bowmanville's residential and commercial architectural heritage was either lost or threatened by demolition and modern development from 1950 to 1980, but a 25-year renaissance in appreciation and awareness (led largely by local historians and LACAC members) helped to preserve the remnants of days gone by.

Bowmanville was incorporated as a village in 1852 and as a town in 1858. In 1974, the town was amalgamated with neighbouring Clarke Township and Darlington Township to form the Town of Newcastle which in turn was renamed the Municipality of Clarington in 1994.

Subdivided housing developments first arrived in the 1950s, with a significant increase in housing development through the 1980s and 1990s. The population rose to about 10,000 in the 1970s, about 20,000 in the 1980s, about 25,000 in the 1990s and today is about 35,000. Transportation improvements in the 1980s included a widening of Highway 401 (first built through Bowmanville in 1952) to six lanes and of Highway 2 to 4/5 lanes. Many have referred to this as the "Lane Era" of Bowmanville.

=== Prisoner of war camp ===
Camp 30, the Lake Ontario Officers' Camp-Bowmanville, held captive German army officers from the Afrika Korps, Luftwaffe aircrew and naval officers from the Kriegsmarine. Farms surrounded the camp that had been a delinquent boys' school prior to the war. In several accounts by former prisoners of war (POWs), the prison was represented as very humane, in that the prisoners were well treated and well fed.

Among the German officers transferred from England to Bowmanville was Korvettenkapitän Otto Kretschmer, who was the top U-boat ace of World War II. Kretschmer assumed the duties of the senior naval officer, sharing the command with the senior Luftwaffe officer Oberstleutnant Hans Hefele and the senior army officer General Leutnant Hans von Ravenstein.

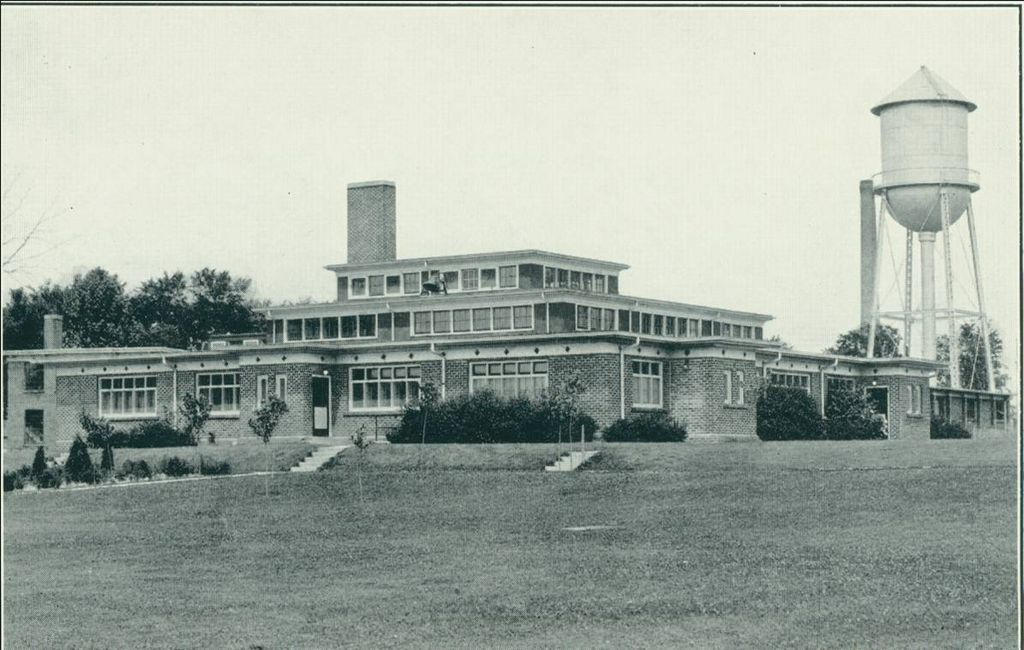
Camp 30, circa 1930.

The Bowmanville boys' school had been quickly turned into a POW camp by surrounding the existing school buildings with a barbed wire fence. The facility, which had been designed to house 300 boys, was cramped and undersized for grown men. Two 12-foot-high (3.7 m) fences with electric lights every twelve feet and nine guard towers surrounded the 14-acre (57,000 m^{2}) site. The fence had sixty miles of barbed wire looped around the small perimeter. Lieutenant Colonel R.O. Bull M.C. had a support staff plus the Veterans Guard of Canada, consisting of nine officers and 239 other ranks under his command to guard the prisoners.

When the naval prisoners arrived at Bowmanville, there were no recreational facilities. The naval officers quickly transformed the camp. Flower and vegetable gardens were planted, sports fields, tennis courts and a swimming pool were built. The quarters were expanded, giving the prisoners better living conditions. The prisoners received money from home or earned extra money by manufacturing wooden furniture. They were able to purchase beer, cigarettes and dry goods from Eaton's mail order catalogue. It was an ideal life except that there were no women and no freedom. For some there was the urge to get back to the war and defend their country, and for others a desire to remain POWs for the duration of the war.

A daily routine of exercise, sporting events and work assignments was established. As well as English being taught, professors from the nearby University of Toronto gave lectures for university credit classes. A school was also formed, which taught midshipmen seamanship and navigation courses.

Current movies were shown each week. National and religious holidays were observed, and music concerts were given regularly. Elaborate stage plays were produced. Extraordinary puppets were designed and fabricated for puppet shows. Although the conditions were good in the Canadian POW camps, there was very little to do, and the routine was always the same.

=== Battle of Bowmanville ===
In October 1942, in a prisoner of war uprising known as the Battle of Bowmanville, between 150 and 400 mostly German prisoners revolted against the guards at Camp 30 after they were shackled as retribution as part of the escalation of Germany's new Commando Order.

Lt.Col. James Taylor had asked German senior officer Georg Friemel to supply 100 prisoners to volunteer to be shackled as part of the ongoing international dispute. When he refused, Otto Kretschmer and Hans Hefele were also asked to provide volunteers, but refused.

Taylor ordered the guards to find 100 officers to be shackled by force, and Horst Elfe, Kretschmer and others barricaded themselves in the mess hall, arming themselves with sticks, iron bars and other makeshift weapons. Approximately 100 Canadian soldiers requisitioned from another base arrived, and together stormed the mess hall using only baseball bats, so the two sides remained evenly matched. After several hours of brawling, the Canadians brought high pressure water hoses and soaked the cabin thoroughly until the prisoners agreed to come out peacefully.

During later incidents in the battle which spanned several days, Volkmar König was wounded by gunfire and another bayoneted, and a Canadian soldier suffered a skull fracture from a thrown jar of jam. After calm had returned, 126 of the prisoners were transferred to other camps.

== Geography ==
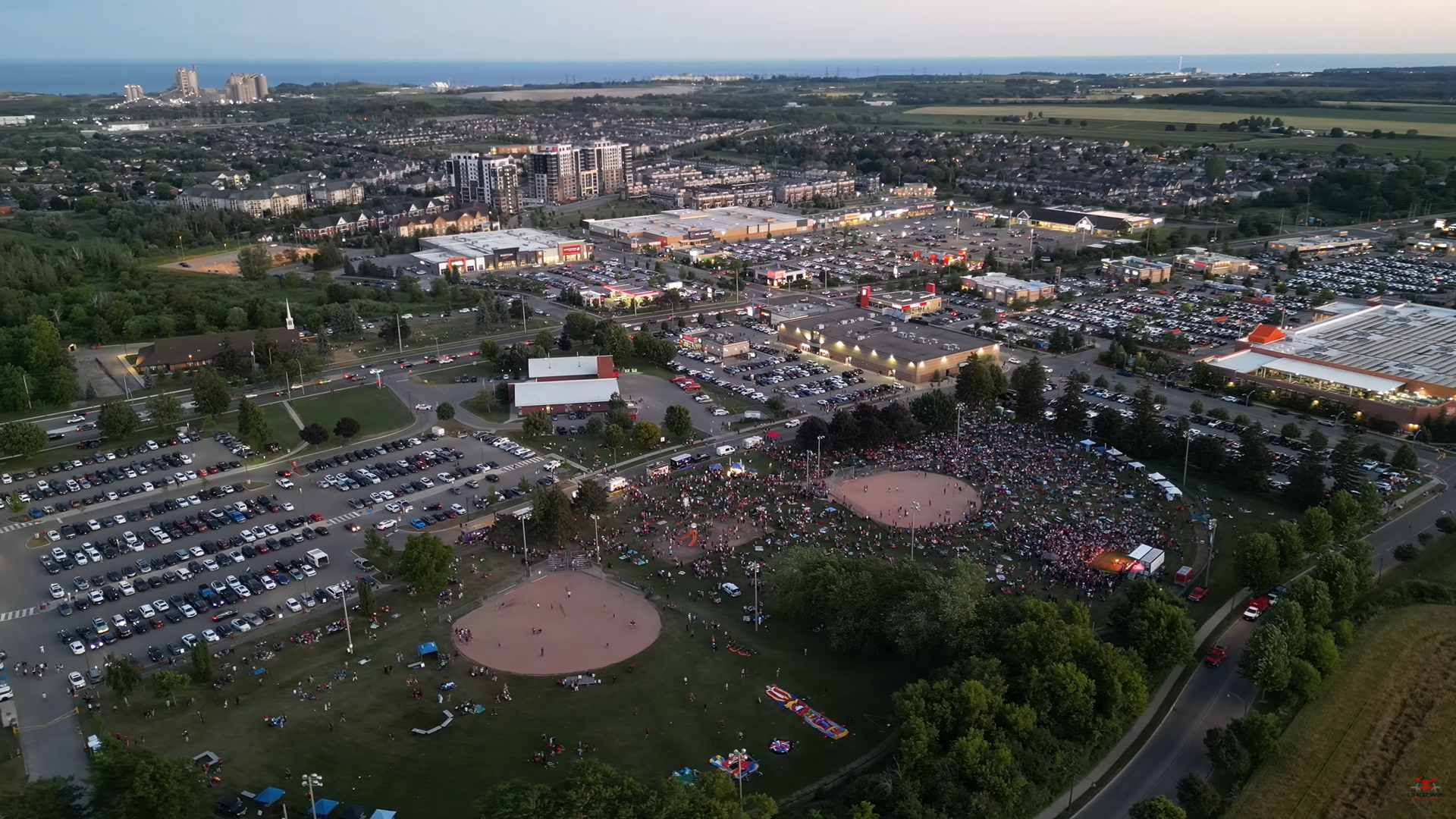
West Urban Centre of Bowmanville

Bowmanville is surrounded by rural areas on three sides, and Lake Ontario to the south. Farmland formerly covered central Bowmanville until the population increased, thus establishing a nascent downtown core by the early 19th century. There is a harbour to the south of Bowmanville in Port Darlington.

=== Climate ===
Under the Köppen climate classification Bowmanville has a humid continental climate with warm summers and cold winters. Unlike many other locations on similar latitudes on the eastern half of the North American continent the winters are relatively mild, with cold extremes being moderated by the proximity to Lake Ontario. In spite of this the average low is around −10 °C (14 °F) in January. Summers are normally moderately warm with averages of around 26 °C (79 °F) during the day but with nights cooling off rapidly to fall below 15 °C (59 °F) on many occasions.

Climate data for Bowmanville Mostert (Clarington) Climate ID: 6150830; coordinates 43°55′N 78°40′W; elevation 99.1 m (325 ft), 1981–2010 normals, extremes 1966–2002
Month	Jan	Feb	Mar	Apr	May	Jun	Jul	Aug	Sep	Oct	Nov	Dec	Year
Record high °C (°F)	13.0 (55.4)	12.5 (54.5)	21.5 (70.7)	29.0 (84.2)	33.0 (91.4)	33.5 (92.3)	36.0 (96.8)	35.0 (95.0)	32.2 (90.0)	26.0 (78.8)	21.1 (70.0)	17.5 (63.5)	36.0 (96.8)
Mean daily maximum °C (°F)	−1.4 (29.5)	0.0 (32.0)	4.3 (39.7)	11.3 (52.3)	18.0 (64.4)	23.1 (73.6)	25.8 (78.4)	24.8 (76.6)	20.4 (68.7)	13.7 (56.7)	7.2 (45.0)	1.6 (34.9)	12.4 (54.3)
Daily mean °C (°F)	−5.6 (21.9)	−4.4 (24.1)	−0.2 (31.6)	6.4 (43.5)	12.4 (54.3)	17.5 (63.5)	20.0 (68.0)	19.2 (66.6)	15.0 (59.0)	8.7 (47.7)	3.4 (38.1)	−2.2 (28.0)	7.5 (45.5)
Mean daily minimum °C (°F)	−9.9 (14.2)	−8.8 (16.2)	−4.6 (23.7)	1.5 (34.7)	6.8 (44.2)	11.8 (53.2)	14.3 (57.7)	13.5 (56.3)	9.5 (49.1)	3.6 (38.5)	−0.4 (31.3)	−6.0 (21.2)	2.6 (36.7)
Record low °C (°F)	−34.0 (−29.2)	−30.0 (−22.0)	−26.0 (−14.8)	−14.4 (6.1)	−5.0 (23.0)	−1.0 (30.2)	2.8 (37.0)	−0.5 (31.1)	−3.3 (26.1)	−8.3 (17.1)	−17.8 (0.0)	−34.5 (−30.1)	−34.5 (−30.1)
Average precipitation mm (inches)	63.1 (2.48)	50.5 (1.99)	55.0 (2.17)	70.6 (2.78)	75.9 (2.99)	83.8 (3.30)	63.2 (2.49)	78.1 (3.07)	98.7 (3.89)	70.8 (2.79)	88.6 (3.49)	68.1 (2.68)	866.5 (34.11)
Average rainfall mm (inches)	32.2 (1.27)	32.8 (1.29)	41.0 (1.61)	68.0 (2.68)	75.9 (2.99)	83.8 (3.30)	63.2 (2.49)	78.1 (3.07)	98.7 (3.89)	70.6 (2.78)	83.1 (3.27)	46.1 (1.81)	773.3 (30.44)
Average snowfall cm (inches)	31.0 (12.2)	17.7 (7.0)	14.1 (5.6)	2.6 (1.0)	0.0 (0.0)	0.0 (0.0)	0.0 (0.0)	0.0 (0.0)	0.0 (0.0)	0.1 (0.0)	5.6 (2.2)	22.0 (8.7)	93.1 (36.7)
Average precipitation days (≥ 0.2 mm)	12.5	10.8	11.2	12.5	12.2	12.0	10.4	11.5	13.0	13.0	14.3	13.0	146.4
Average rainy days (≥ 0.2 mm)	5.5	5.3	8.0	11.8	12.2	12.0	10.4	11.5	13.0	13.0	12.7	7.4	122.7
Average snowy days (≥ 0.2 cm)	7.8	6.3	4.0	1.1	0.0	0.0	0.0	0.0	0.0	0.1	2.1	6.5	27.9
Source: Environment Canada

== Economy ==
Starting in the 19th century, Bowmanville has served as the home of many diverse manufacturers including the historic Bowmanville Foundry, the Darlington Nuclear Generating Station, a Royal Canadian Mounted Police regional office, Goodyear conveyor belt factory (recently sold). There is a marina on Lake Ontario at Port Darlington, south of town. Bowmanville was a finalist for the ITER project. Southern Ontario's GO Train commuter rail service is to be expanded to Bowmanville by 2024. This will increase the efficiency of public transportation to nearby cities such as Oshawa, and beyond. Currently, Darlington Nuclear Generating Station is the largest employer in Bowmanville.

In 2017, Toyota Canada Inc., announced plans to open a new parts distribution site, known as "Eastern Canada Parts Distribution Centre", to replace the current plant in Toronto, Ontario, at the intersection of Lambs Road and Baseline Road. Toyota also plans to add a new nature trail known as the "Toyota Trail" that will connect the Soper Creek Trail to the new plant. The facility is planned to open in 2019.

An outlet mall was planned to be built in Bowmanville near the Highway 401/Waverley Road interchange, but the company abandoned the project shortly thereafter due to "cost prohibitive complexities".

On June 10, 2019, it was announced that Ontario Power Generation would have its corporate headquarters relocated next to the Darlington Energy Complex.

In May 2024, Kaitlin Corporation proposed constructing 9 highrises as tall as 40 storeys with approximately 3900 units near the proposed Bowmanville GO Station.

== Attractions ==
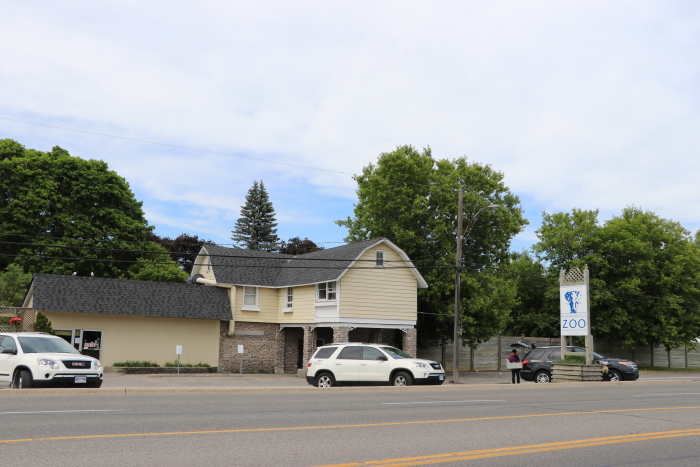
Former Bowmanville Zoo, seen in 2016 prior to closure.

The Canadian Tire Motorsport Park (formerly Mosport International Raceway) which hosts both minor grand prix races and major racing events by CASCAR, the SCCA, NASCAR, and the United SportsCar Championship annually is located about 25 kilometres north of Bowmanville.

Bowmanville was home to the oldest private zoo in Canada, the Bowmanville Zoo until its closure in 2016.

The Bowmanville Santa Claus Parade has been held annually on the third Saturday of November since 1961.

== Sports ==
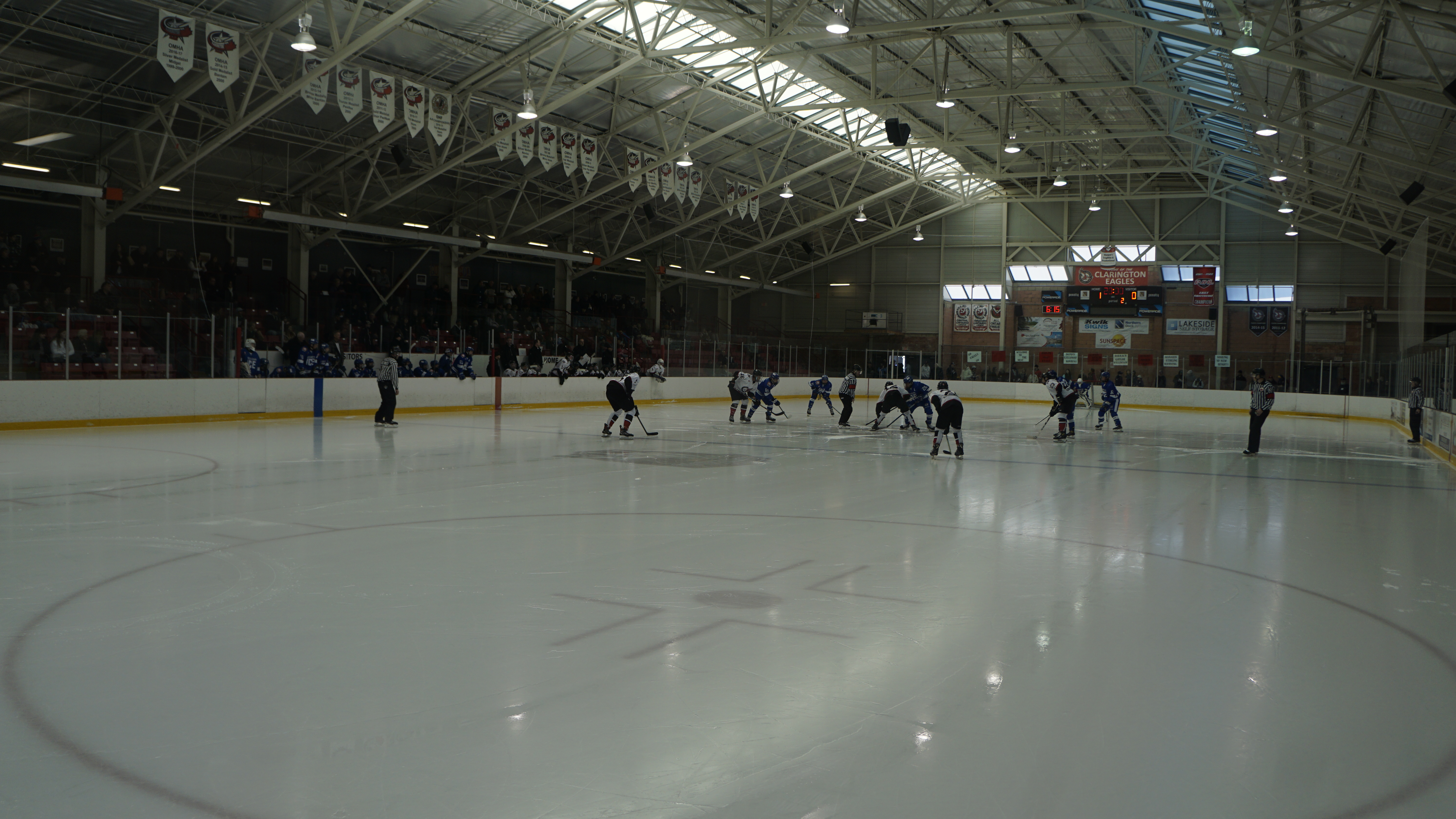
Ice rink at the Garnet B. Rickard Recreation Complex.

In the 1960s the Oshawa Generals and Bobby Orr played hockey in the old Bowmanville Arena on Queen Street while awaiting the Oshawa Civic Auditorium's completion.

The Bowmanville Eagles were the most recent local hockey team to play in Bowmanville, but were merged with the nearby Cobourg Cougars in early 2010 by the CCHL and OJHL.

The Bowmanville Eagles were reborn in 2011. The hockey team was admitted as a Junior C Hockey Club playing in the Central Ontario Junior C League. The Eagles were a Junior C team in the 1970s, 1980s and early 1990s. The Eagles applied and were accepted to the Junior A level in 1995. The Eagles were a powerhouse team in the 1980s winning the Charles Schmalz Cup (Provincial Jr C Championship) in 1982. They won the Central Ontario Championships in 1981, 82, 84, 85, 92, 93 and 94.

In their final season as a Jr. C team before moving to Jr. A, the Eagles went to the Schmalz Cup Final. The Eagles did not have success at the Jr A level until approximately 2004. They had moderate success from there until 2010. The Jr. A league decided it needed to contract some clubs and unfortunately the Eagles were one of the clubs on the contraction list.

In their inaugural season back as a Junior C club, the Eagles won the Central Ontario League Championship. The Eagles won playoff rounds over Uxbridge, Little Britain and Lakefield. In the Provincial round of the playoffs the Eagles went up against the Campbellford Rebels of the Empire Jr C league where they lost out in seven games.

Bowmanville is the home of the Clarington Tigercats - Durham Knights Football Club which was founded in 1999.

In 1997 the Oshawa Green Gaels lacrosse franchise moved to Clarington. They play out of the Garnet B Rickard complex. Since relocating to Clarington in 97 the Gaels have been one of the most dominant lacrosse franchises in the Jr B loop. They have never had a losing season to date and have won 4 Founders Cup championships as the best Canadian Jr B lacrosse team in the Country.

East of Bowmanville in Clarington is the Canadian Tire Motorsport Park, a motorsports complex that currently hosts the NASCAR Canada Series (Clarington 200), and the IMSA SportsCar Championship (Chevrolet Grand Prix), and formerly hosted the NASCAR Gander Outdoors Truck Series (Chevrolet Silverado 250), and the Formula One World Championship (Canadian Grand Prix).

== Emergency services ==
Policing in Bowmanville is handled by the East Division of the Durham Regional Police. The new police station in Bowmanville opened in February 2016, which includes the DRPS forensic identification building. The provincially maintained highways near Bowmanville are under the jurisdiction of the Ontario Provincial Police.

Bowmanville was formerly home to the Royal Canadian Mounted Police Toronto East Detachment under "O" Division. The detachment was closed in May 2017 because it was the smallest detachment in the Greater Toronto Area, and was identified as being appropriate for closure.

There is one fire station in Bowmanville, located at 7075 King Street East. In 2014, the fire station underwent significant renovations to accommodate growth and to meet accessibility legislation.

Lakeridge Health Bowmanville is a fully accredited hospital located in Bowmanville, which is run by the Lakeridge Health Corporation. A significant redevelopment and expansion of the hospital was announced in January 2018, which will allow the hospital to provide greater patient programs and services and an improved health care experience.

== Infrastructure ==
=== Transportation ===
Since the 1950s, Bowmanville has been accessible via Highway 401 and Highway 407 which are about 13.5 kilometers away from each other (via Liberty Street) and is served by three interchanges: Bowmanville Ave (formerly Waverley Road) — Durham Road 57 (Exit 431), Liberty Street — Durham Road 14 (Exit 432) and Bennett Road (Exit 435), that also serves the retirement community of Wilmot Creek on the Lake Ontario shore. The interchange with Highway 35 and Highway 115 to Lindsay and Peterborough (exit 436) lies 500 metres east of Bennett Road.

Bowmanville is bisected by the Canadian Pacific Railway, while the Canadian National Railway runs to the south of the town. Bowmanville had its own transit system, Clarington Transit from 2002 to 2005, and is now served by Durham Region Transit, which offers connections to GO Transit and Via Rail.

GO Transit plans to extend the Lakeshore East line train service to Bowmanville by 2024.

== Education ==
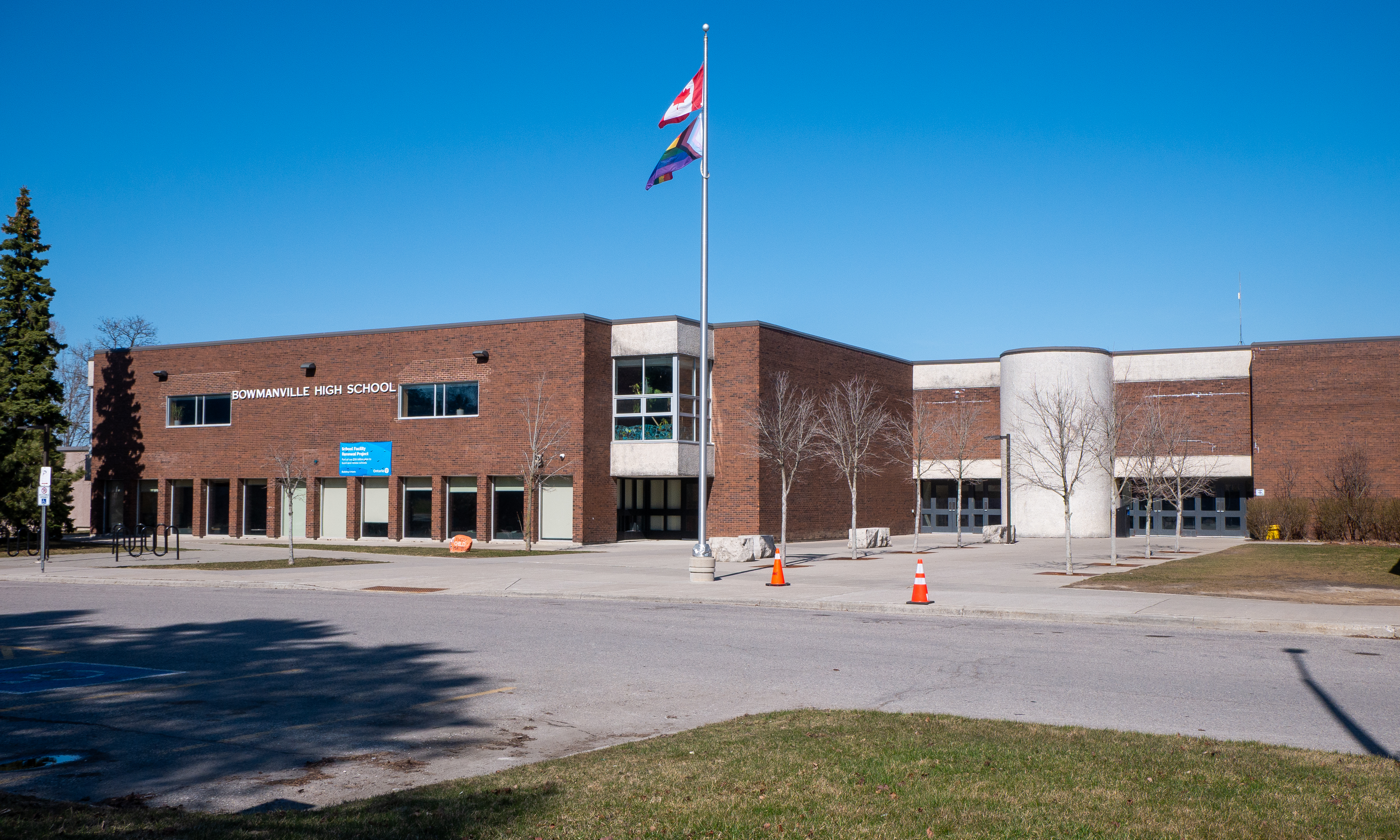
Bowmanville High School, 2025

Public elementary and secondary education in Bowmanville is operated by the Kawartha Pine Ridge District School Board. There are eight public elementary schools in Bowmanville: Central Public School, Charles Bowman Public School, Dr. Ross Tilley Public School, Duke of Cambridge Public School (French Immersion), Harold Longworth Public School, John M. James Public School, Vincent Massey Public School, and Waverley Public School. There are two public secondary schools, Bowmanville High School and Clarington Central Secondary School.

Catholic elementary and secondary education in Bowmanville is served by the Peterborough Victoria Northumberland and Clarington Catholic District School Board. There are three Catholic elementary schools in Bowmanville: Holy Family Catholic Elementary School, St. Elizabeth Catholic Elementary School, and St. Joseph's Catholic Elementary School (French Immersion). There is one Catholic secondary school in Bowmanville, St. Stephen Catholic Secondary School.

The Clarington Centre for Individual Studies (CCIS) is an alternative secondary school in Bowmanville, operated by the Kawartha Pine Ridge District School Board. CCIS offers flexible programming for students looking to graduate high school, and is geared towards students who are young parents, have personal commitments that make attending regular school difficult, have been unsuccessful at completing their education at a traditional school, and/or prefer to work at an individualized pace.

Blaisdale Montessori School has a campus located in Bowmanville, which looks after children from when they are toddlers until Grade 3. Knox Christian School and Durham Christian High School are religious private schools located in Bowmanville.

== Notable people ==
- Josh Bailey, National Hockey League (NHL) player NHL
- Harvey William Burk, West Durham M.P.P.
- Declan Chisholm, NHL player
- Eleven Past One, band
- The Great Farini, famed acrobatic performer of the 19th century.
- Sam Hughes, former Minister of Militia and Defence
- William Humber, baseball historian, Canadian Baseball Hall of Fame inductee
- G. B. Jones, film-maker/musician/artist
- Mike Keenan, former NHL coach, won Stanley Cup in 1994
- Chris Kelly, NHL player
- Brooke McQuigge, forward for the Minnesota Frost in the Professional Women's Hockey League (PWHL).
- Lee Mellor, author and musician
- Not by Choice, pop punk band
- Erin O'Toole, Canadian Member of Parliament, former leader of the Conservative Party of Canada
- Lindsey Park, Ontario Member of Provincial Parliament
- Meghan Patrick, country singer
- Garnet Rickard, first mayor of the municipality of Town of Newcastle; now Clarington, from 1974 to 1985
- Paul Robins, Bible Christian minister
- Alfred Shrubb, a world record holding distance runner from the turn of the 20th century
- Ava Stewart, artistic gymnast
- Elvis Stojko, figure skater
- Tim Taylor, country singer-songwriter
- Albert Ross Tilley, WWII burn surgeon and Order of Canada recipient
