= John Daly (runner) =

Irish runner (1880–1969)

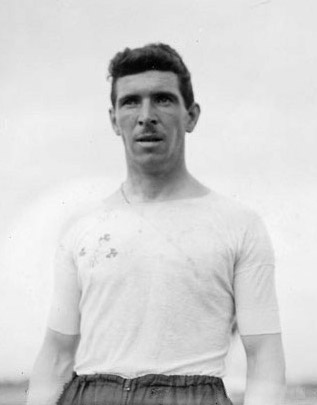
- Daly in 1904

Personal information
- Full name: John Joseph Daly
- Born: 22 February 1880 Ballgluin, Galway, Ireland
- Died: 11 March 1969 (aged 89) New York City, United States
- Height: 1.87 m (6 ft 2 in)
- Weight: 83 kg (183 lb)

Sport
- Sport: Track and field
- Event: 1500 m – marathon
- Club: Gaelic Athletic Association

Achievements and titles
- Personal bests: Mile – 4:27.8 (1902); 5000 m – 15:34.4 (1911); 10000 m – 33:39.6 (1914)
Medal record
Olympic Games
Representing United Kingdom
Silver medal – second place	1904 St Louis	2590 m steeplechase
Representing United Kingdom
International Cross Country Championships
Bronze medal – third place	1903 Hamilton	Individual
Silver medal – second place	1903 Hamilton	Team
Silver medal – second place	1906 Caerleon	Team

John Joseph Daly (22 February 1880 – 11 March 1969) was an Irish runner who won a silver medal in the steeplechase at the 1904 Summer Olympics. He competed for Ireland at the International Cross Country Championships of 1903–1906 and won two silver team medals; individually he won a bronze in 1903 and finished fourth in 1904 and 1906. When not competing for Ireland as a member of the Gaelic Athletic Association, Daly entered races as a member of the Irish American Athletic Club.

== Biography ==
Daly competed in the 2590 metre steeplechase at the 1904 Summer Olympics held in St Louis, United States and won the silver medal. Daly represented Ireland. After the Olympics Daily stayed in North America for two years, and later that year won the Canadian mile and two-mile championships.

In 1906, Daly and two other athletes, Con Leahy and Peter O'Connor, were entered for the Intercalated Games in Athens by the IAAA and GAA, representing Ireland, and were given green blazers and caps with a gold shamrock, and an Irish flag (the Erin Go Bragh flag).

However, the rules of the Olympics were subsequently changed so that only athletes nominated by National Olympic Committees were eligible to compete. Since Ireland did not have an Olympic Committee, the British Olympic Council claimed the three athletes their own, with Daly and his fellow athletes being registered as competing for Britain.

Later, O'Connor won the silver medal in the long jump, and he was enraged to see the Union Jack raised for his medal ceremony. In what became the first political protest in modern Olympic history, O'Connor scaled the flagpole, took down the Union Jack, and replaced it with the Irish flag.

As officials and stadium security moved to intervene, Daly stood guard at the bottom of the pole with Irish-American wrestler Con O'Kelly, with Irish and American fans invading the field to assist them.

At those Games, Daly finished third in the five-mile competition, but was disqualified for obstructing Edward Dahl. He abandoned his marathon race after 18 miles due to blisters and an ankle injury, which resulted in a three-day hospitalisation. After 1906, Daly mostly raced in the United States, where he later became a successful New York businessman. He was selected to compete for Great Britain and Ireland at the London 1908 Olympics, but he did not compete.

In 1907, he enjoyed his greatest successes, winning the 5-mile and 10-mile U.S. A.A.U. titles and the Canadian 3-mile title. In 1909, running for the Irish American Athletic Club, he came in second place in the Yonkers Marathon, in a time of 2 hours 55 minutes and 44 and 4/5 seconds.

This athlete is not to be confused with the Private John Daly (Connaught Rangers) who ran for Ireland at the 1911 International Cross Country Championships in Caerleon, Wales.
