= Alfred Shrubb =

English runner

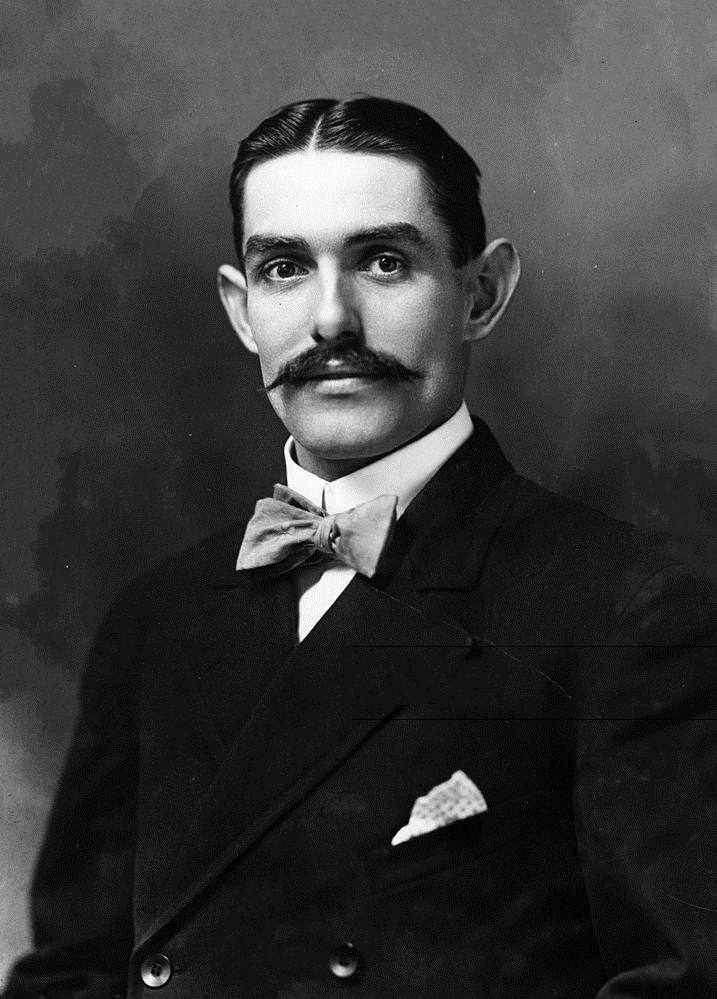

Personal information
- Born: 12 December 1879 Slinfold, West Sussex, England
- Died: 23 April 1964 (aged 84) Bowmanville, Canada

Sport
- Sport: Athletics
- Event: 1500–10,000 m

Achievements and titles
- Personal bests: 1500 m – 4:17.2 (1903); Mile – 4:22.0 (1904); 5000 m – 14:51.2 (1904); 10,000 m – 30:51.6 (1904)
Medal record
Representing England
International Cross Country Championships
Gold medal – first place	1903 Hamilton	Individual
Gold medal – first place	1903 Hamilton	Team
Gold medal – first place	1904 St Helen	Individual
Gold medal – first place	1904 St Helen	Team

Alfred Shrubb (12 December 1879 – 23 April 1964) was an English middle and long-distance runner. During an amateur career lasting from 1899 to 1905 (when he was barred from amateur competition for receiving payment for running) and a professional career from 1905 to 1912 he won over 1,000 races of about 1,800.

== Biography ==
At the peak of his career he was virtually unbeatable at distances up to 15 miles, often racing against relay teams so that the race would be more competitive.

Shrubb was four-times National 4 miles Champion after winning the AAA Championships title starting with the 1900 AAA Championships and ending with the 1904 AAA Championships. Additionally he won the 10 miles title four times from 1901 to 1904.

On 4 November 1904, at Ibrox Park, Glasgow, he broke the one hour run record as well as all amateur records from six to eleven miles, and all professional records from eight to eleven miles, running eleven miles, 1137 yards (18.742 km) in one hour. Altogether he set 28 world records.

He raced ten times against the record-holding Canadian First Nations marathoner Tom Longboat, winning all the races shorter than 20 miles and losing all the longer races. In 1908 he became coach of the Harvard University cross-country team, leading it to a national title. From 1919 to 1928 he coached the University of Oxford Athletics Club.

In 1928 Alfred made his home permanently in Canada, where he operated the Cream of Barley Mill in Bowmanville, Ontario until 1949. He died there in 1964.

He is commemorated by the annual Alfie Shrubb Museum Run in Bowmanville, and the annual Alf Shrubb Memorial 10 km and 5 km races in September in Slinfold.

== See also ==
- 5000 metres world record progression
- 10,000 metres world record progression
- Two miles
