= Harry Lawson (runner) =

Canadian marathon runner

Harry Lawson (11 May 1881 – 17 October 1955) was a track and field athlete who competed in the 1908 Summer Olympics for Canada. He finished seventh in the men's marathon. He was born in Leeds, West Yorkshire, England.
